= De aquaeductu =

Report to the emperor on the aqueducts of Rome

De aquaeductu (English: On aqueducts) is a two-book official report given to the emperor Nerva or Trajan on the state of the aqueducts of Rome, and was written by Sextus Julius Frontinus at the end of the 1st century AD. It is also known as De Aquis or De Aqueductibus Urbis Romae. It is the earliest official report of an investigation made by a distinguished citizen on Roman engineering works to have survived. Frontinus had been appointed Water Commissioner by the emperor Nerva in AD 96.

With the recovery of Frontinus' manuscript from the library at Monte Cassino in 1425, effected by the humanist Poggio Bracciolini, details of the construction and maintenance of the Roman aqueduct system became available once more, just as Renaissance Rome began to revive and require a dependable source of pure water.

== Water supply of Rome ==
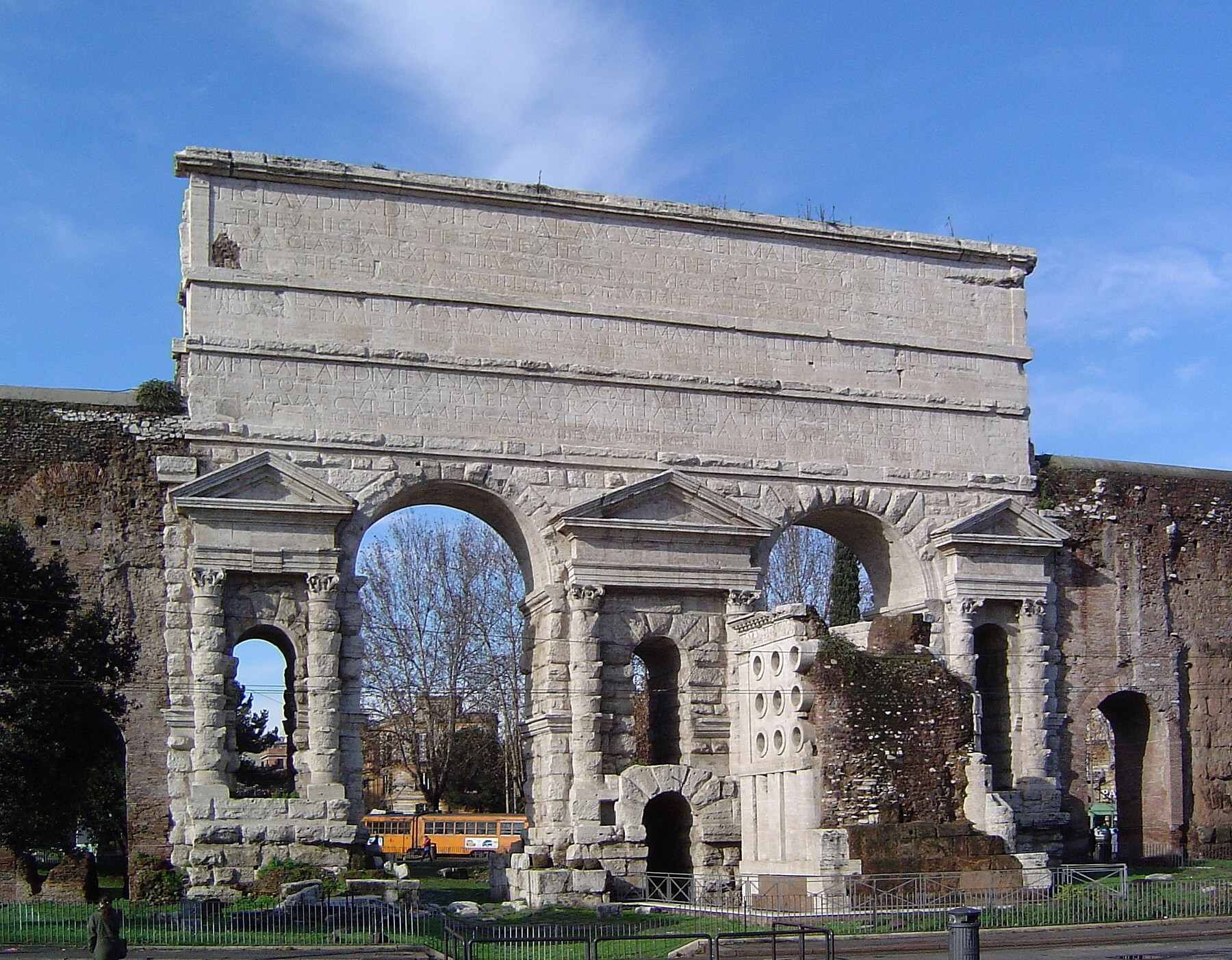
Remains of the Aqua Claudia and Aqua Anio Novus, integrated into the Aurelian Wall

The work presents a history and description of the water-supply of the city of Rome, including the laws relating to its use and maintenance. Frontinus provides the history, sizes and discharge rates of all of the nine aqueducts of Rome at the time at which he was writing at the turn of the 1st century AD: the Aqua Marcia, Aqua Appia, Aqua Alsietina, Aqua Tepula, Anio Vetus, Anio Novus, Aqua Virgo, Aqua Claudia and Aqua Augusta. He describes the quality of water delivered by each, mainly depending on their source, be it river, lake, or spring.

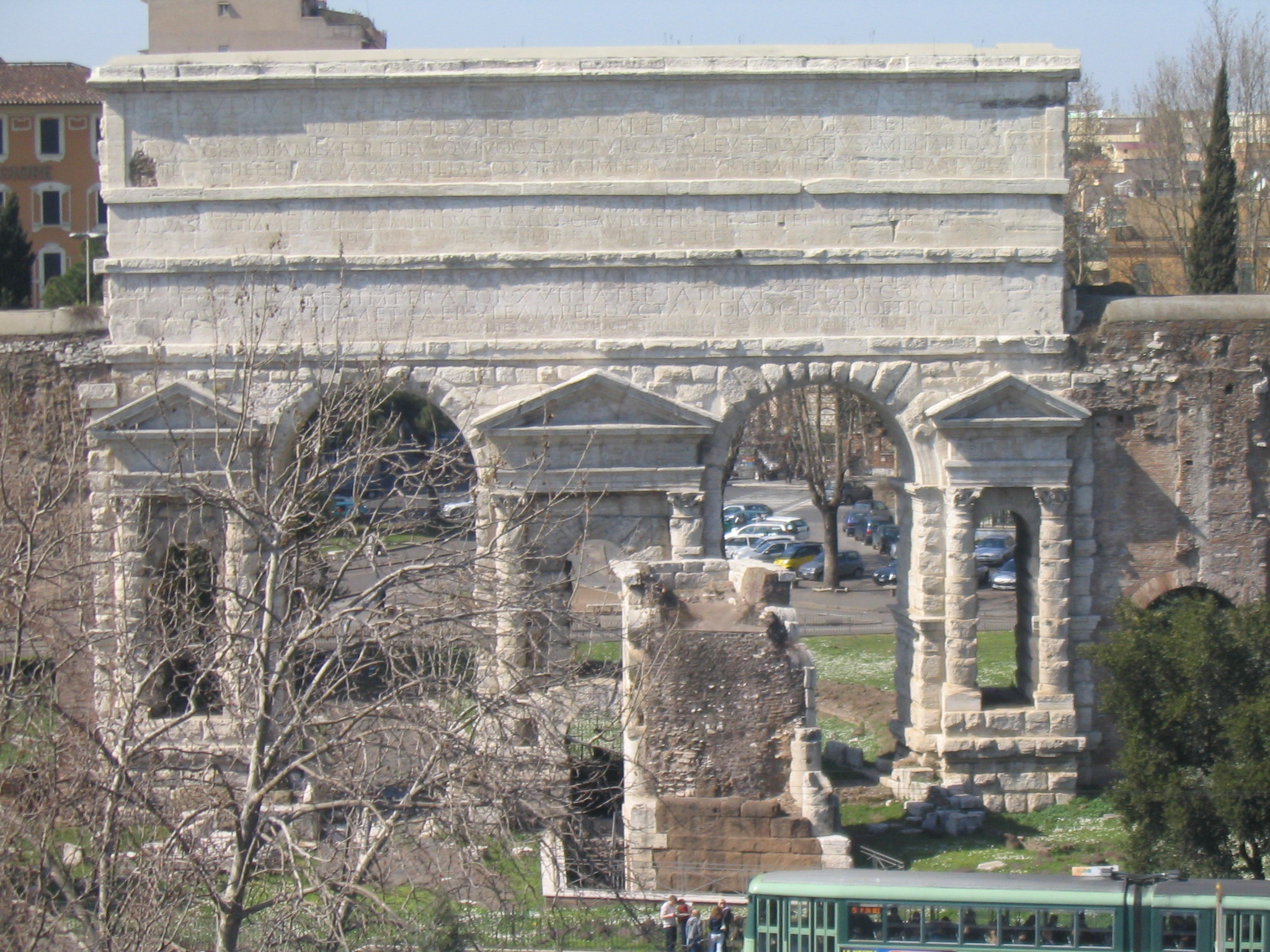
Outer side of the Porta Praenestina-Labicana (today Porta Maggiore).

One of the first jobs Frontinus undertook when appointed water commissioner was to prepare maps of the system so that he could assess their condition before undertaking their maintenance. He says that many had been neglected and were not working at their full capacity. He was especially concerned by diversion of the supply by unscrupulous farmers, tradesmen, and domestic users, among others. They would insert pipes into the channel of the aqueducts to tap the supply without official approval, or insert pipes of larger diameter than approved. Roman lead pipe inscriptions bearing the name of the owner were meant to prevent such water theft.

He, therefore, made a meticulous survey of the intake and the supply of each line, and then investigated the apparent discrepancies. His assessment was based on the cross-sectional area of the pipes or channels, and he did not take water velocity into consideration.

Frontinus was well aware of the seminal work De architectura by Vitruvius, which mentions aqueduct construction and maintenance of the channels, published in the previous century. Frontinus refers to the possible influence of Vitruvius on the plumbers.

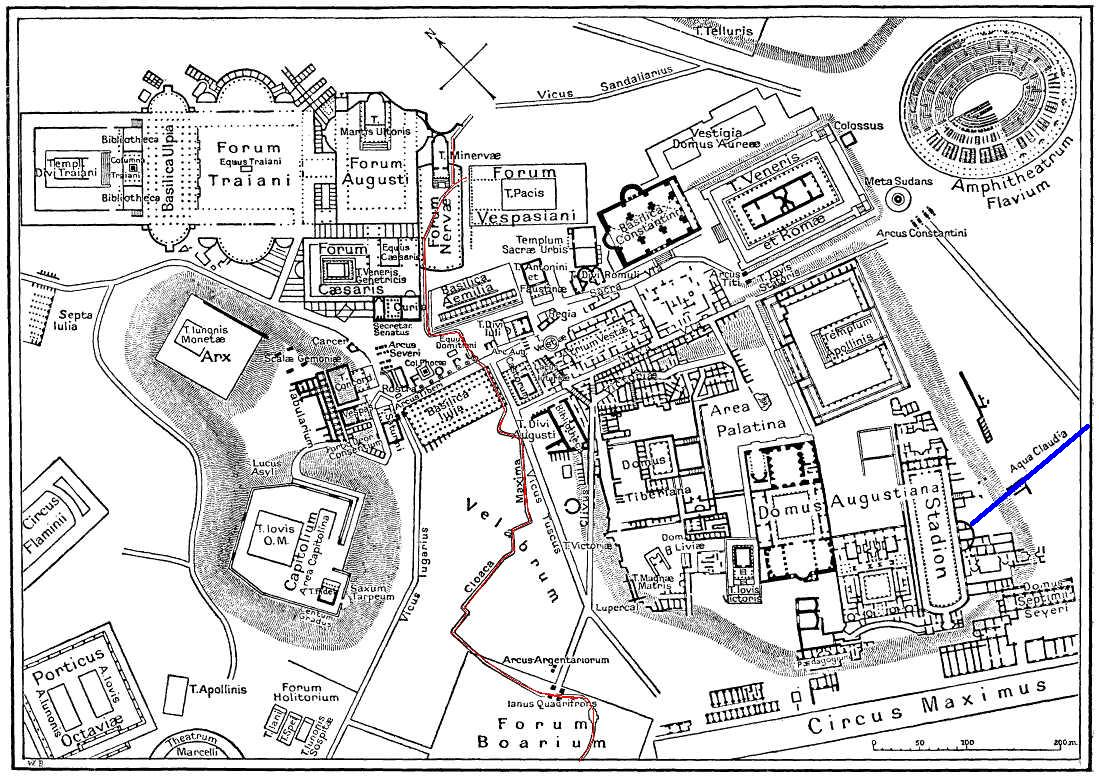
Map of central Rome, showing Cloaca Maxima in red and Aqua Claudia in blue

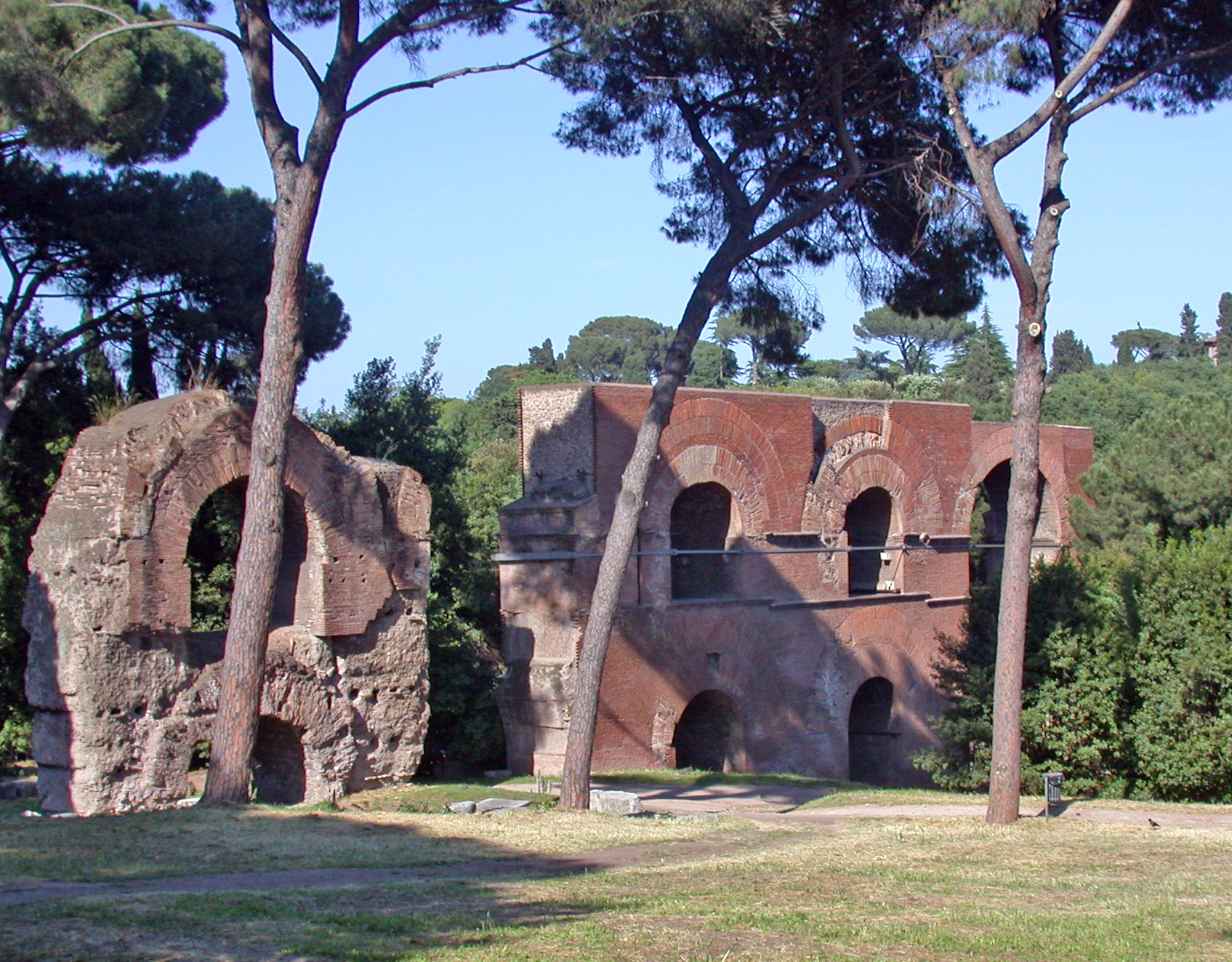
Remains of Aqua Claudia

=== Distribution system ===
Distribution of the water depended in a complex way on its height entering the city, the quality of the water, and its rate of discharge. Thus, poor-quality water would be sent for irrigation, gardens, or flushing, while only the best would be reserved for potable use. Intermediate-quality water would be used for the many baths and fountains. However, Frontinus criticises the practice of mixing supplies from different sources, and one of his first decisions was to separate the waters from each system.

Waste water would end up primarily in the main sewers, which led into the Cloaca Maxima and finally the river Tiber. The continuous flow of water ensured that the sewers were kept clear and free of obstructions, and so contributed to the hygiene of the city.

=== Maintenance ===
Frontinus was very concerned by leaks in the system, especially those in the underground conduits, which were difficult to locate and mend, a problem still faced by water engineers today. The aqueducts above ground needed care to ensure that the masonry was kept in good condition, especially those running on arched superstructures. They were mainly those aqueducts approaching Rome from the east over the plains of the Roman Campagna. It was, he said, essential to keep trees at a distance so that their roots would not damage the structures. Silting of the channels was another common problem, especially those aqueducts that drew water directly from rivers, such as Anio Novus, and numerous settling tanks (each one being known as a castellum) were built along their lengths. They also served as convenient distribution points in the city itself, where the supply was split to feed different uses.

He reviewed the existing law governing the state aqueducts, as well as the need for enforcement of those statutes.

== Translations ==
In the 20th century, Charles E. Bennett translated the work into English as "Aqueducts of Rome". This version was published with Strategemata in the Loeb Classical Library.

== See also ==
- Roman aqueducts
- List of Roman aqueduct bridges
- Roman architecture
- Roman engineering
- Vitruvius
- De Architectura
