= Aqua Anio Vetus =

Archeological site in Italy

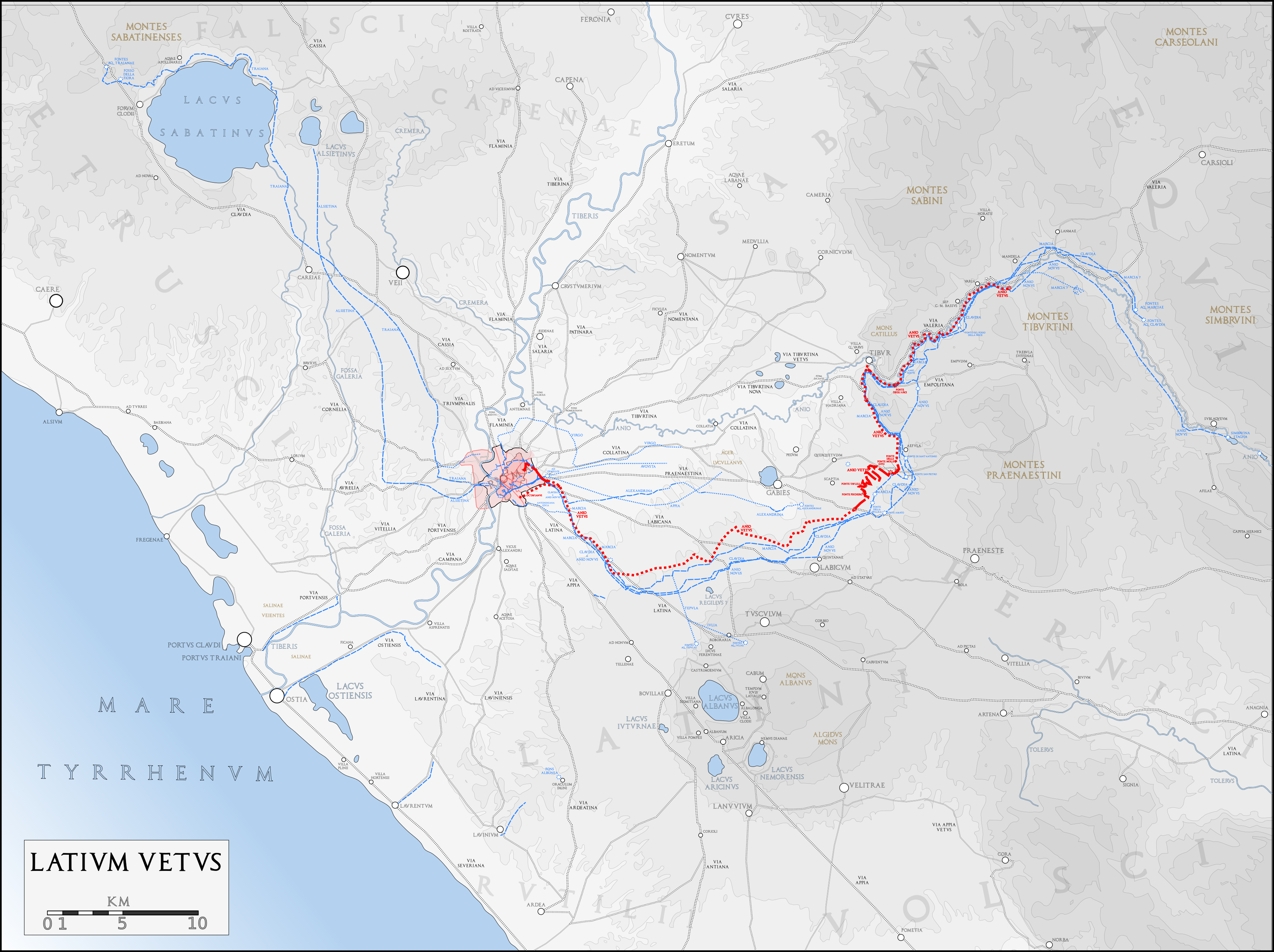
Route of Aqua Anio Vetus (in red)

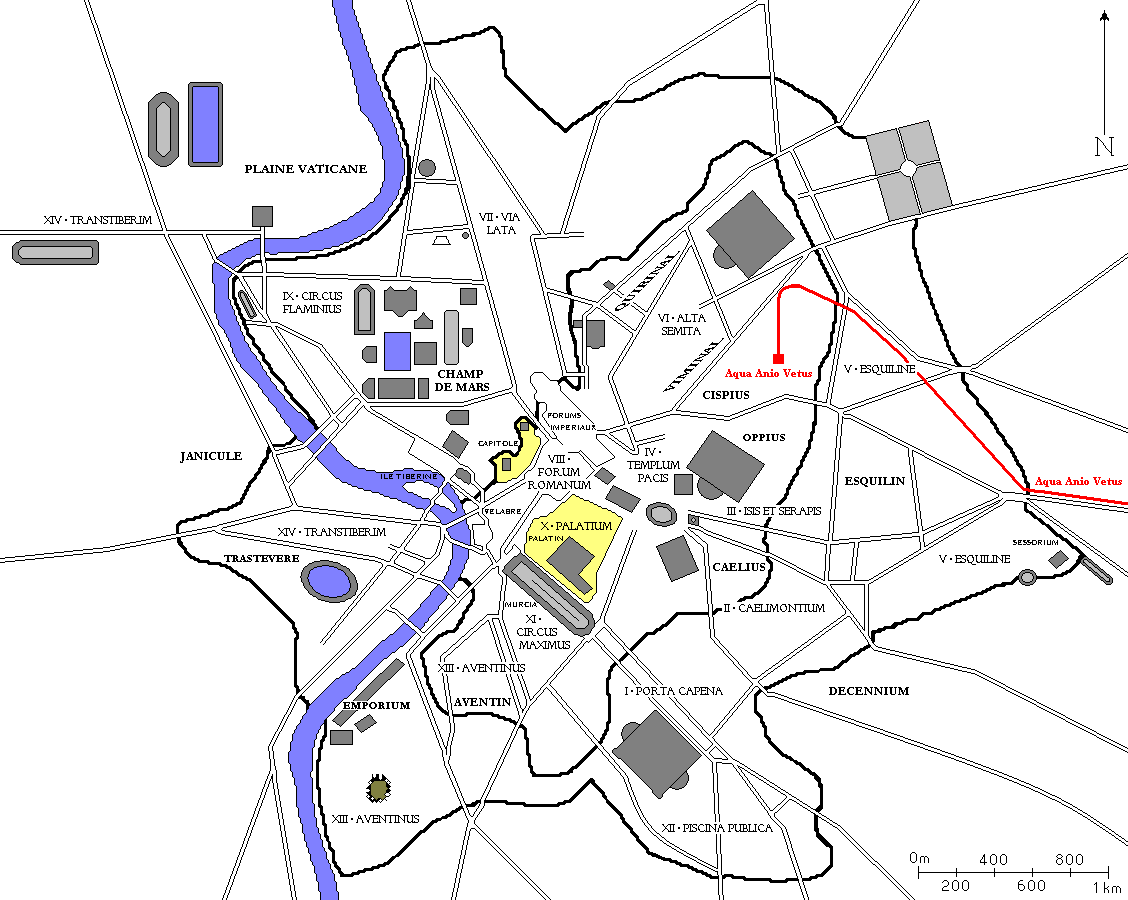
Terminus of the Anio Vetus in Rome

The Aqua Anio Vetus was a Roman aqueduct, commissioned in 272 BC by censor Manius Curius Dentatus and funded from the war booty seized after the victory against Pyrrhus of Epirus.

The aqueduct was 64 km (40 mi) long, approximately four times as long as Aqua Appia, and its discharge of 175,920 m^{3} (46,470,000 US gal) over twice as large as the discharge of Aqua Appia. Its source is also much higher than the intake of Aqua Appia and it supplied water to higher elevations of the city.

The intake of the aqueduct was the river Anio, the water being taken directly from the river, and this made the water both muddy and discolored. Because of low water quality, the water from the aqueduct was not used for drinking in later times.

The aqueduct acquired the nickname of Vetus ("old") only after the Anio Novus was built almost three centuries later.

Constructing the aqueduct took over three years, and it was not finished until a duumviri (a committee of two) was appointed by the Senate to complete the works. The appointees were the former cencor Curius, who had commissioned the aqueduct in the first place, and Flavius Flaccus -- since Curius died only five days after his appointment, the honor of actually finishing the construction of Anio Vetus went to Flaccus.

== Route ==
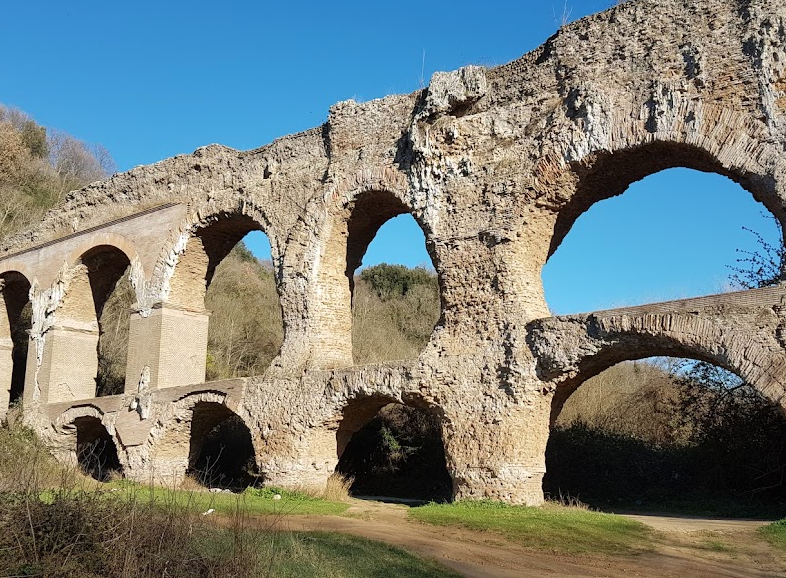
Ponte della Mola

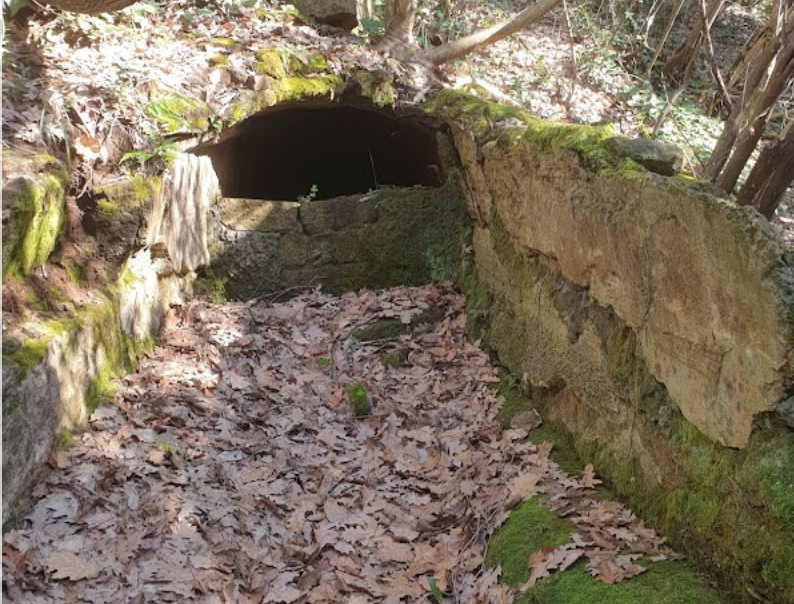
Ponte della Mola specus

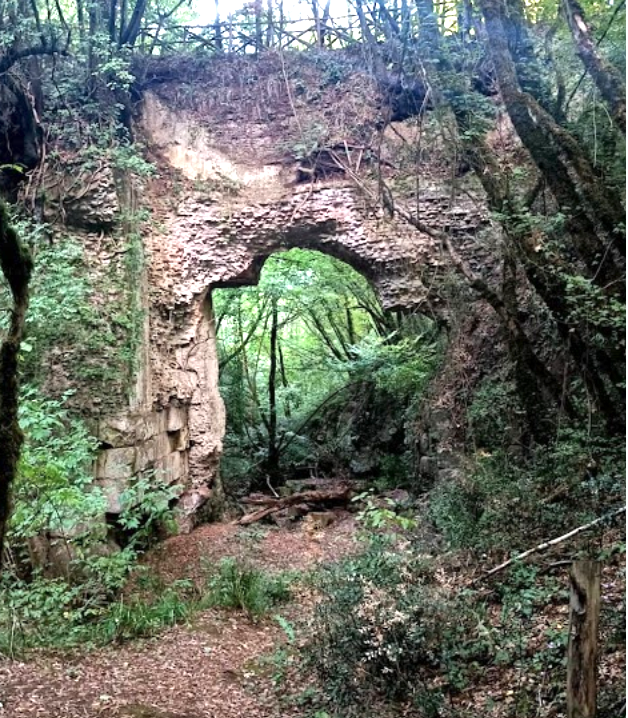
Ponte Taulella

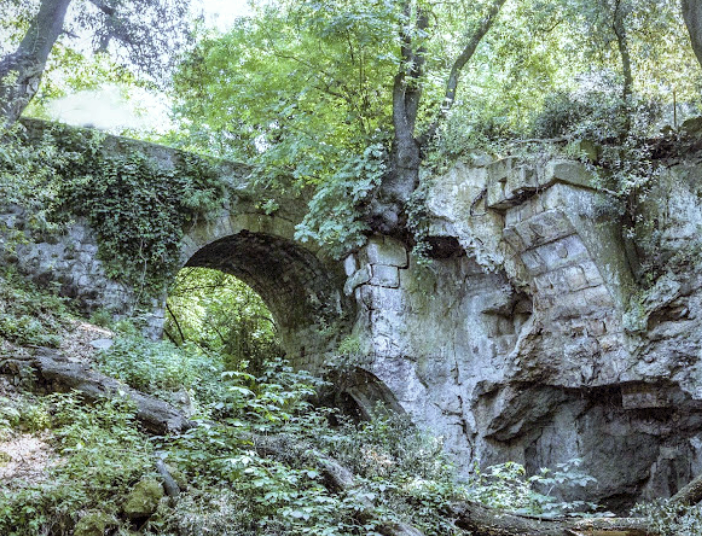
Ponte Pischero

Its source is believed to be between Vicovaro and Mandela, 850 m (2,790 ft) upstream of the gorge at the Convent of San Cosimato, near Vicovaro. Like the Aqua Appia, its route was mainly underground, but it emerged at many points to cross river valleys especially after bridges using better technology were later used to shorten its course considerably.

It descended from its source along the valley to Tivoli, where it left the Anio towards the Alban Hills to near Gallicano, below Palestrina. It crossed under the Via Latina near the seventh milestone and at the fourth milestone turned northwest to enter Rome.

It entered the city underground at the Porta Praenestina and terminated inside the Porta Esquilina. Only 5.8% of the Vetus' total flow supplied imperial buildings, an important difference from the Appia, which provided almost 22% to such buildings.

It had 35 castella for distribution in the city.

Three major restorations were done along with the Appia aqueduct: in 144 BC by the praetor Quintus Marcius Rex during construction of the Aqua Marcia, by adding a secondary conduit in the Casal Morena area and other improvements; in 33 BC when Agrippa took control of the entire water system of the city; and between 11 and 4 BC by Augustus. With this latter, an underground branch was built, the specus Octavianus, that started from the current Pigneto area and followed the Via Casilina and reached the area where the Baths of Caracalla were later built.

Other restorations in the first two centuries AD include the construction of bridges across valleys on the route to shortcut long underground diversions.

== Remains ==
Remains of several bridges still exist: Ponte Della Mola, Ponte Taulella, and Ponte Pischero.

=== Ponte Della Mola ===
The Ponte della Mola is one of the most majestic aqueduct bridges and is located near the village of San Vittorino. It crosses the Mola stream with a series of 22 arches mostly in two-tier arrangement over a length of 155 m (509 ft) and a height of 24.5 m (80 ft). Earlier routes of the aqueduct passed over two other bridges starting higher upstream which were successively abandoned when they became excessively damaged. Hadrian built the bridge also to shorten the route by about 1.5 km (0.93 mi).

The bridge is made of Roman concrete covered with opus reticulatum with the use of tufa blocks in the abutments and brickwork for the arch. It has a notable asymmetry due to the connection with the original channels at each end which were of widely different levels at this point in the valley as they previously followed a long loop. Therefore the moderate slope of 1.1 m over 142 m of length (3½ ft over 466 ft) (0.77%) of the first 18 arches was followed by the considerable slope of 4.1 m over 25 m (13 ft over 82 ft) (16.3%) of the last four arches, as it was safer to lose energy in a short waterfall.

The central part, a stretch of three double arches, collapsed in 1965 and an adjacent fourth double arch was soon demolished because it was unsafe.

=== Ponte Taulella ===
The bridge allowed the Anio Vetus to cross the Rio Secco gorge and thus avoid several valleys along the route. It was first built in brick, resting on pillars in opus quadratum from the Augustan age, later reinforced with thick opus reticulatum supports which greatly reduced the width of the span. Erosion at the base has now revealed the oldest structures again. The name of the bridge derives from the unit of measurement in force in the Papal States (the Taulella = 72 square rods)

=== Ponte Pischero ===
The bridge crossed the gorge of Caipoli, with two parallel arches, one for the aqueduct and another for the service viaduct. The abutments of the bridge are made of opus quadratum (45 cm [18 in] blocks on each side) reinforced in the Augustan era with opus reticulatum walls.

The downstream channel was blocked causing the water to fall into the gorge in which a dam held the water to create a settling tank and another conduit then transported the water to a tower via a siphon, and into a new channel (by-passing the dilapidated Inverso bridge). From the resultant lake, water was used for a nearby system (perhaps a nymphaeum or thermal baths). However this created instability over time which slowly led to the collapse of the bridge. The northern bridge abutment rested on a large block of travertine, which in turn rested on a tuff bank. The water apparently acted as a lubricant between these structures and, probably in conjunction with a flash flood or earthquake, the travertine block slid downstream, causing the bridge to collapse. The resultant flood then caused the collapse of the dam and the failure of this stretch of aqueduct.

At the bottom of the gorge are two rooms dug out of the tuff bank which were most likely used to house workers during aqueduct construction and completely submerged when the dam was built.

== See also ==
- List of aqueducts in the city of Rome
- List of aqueducts in the Roman Empire
- List of aqueducts in the city of Rome by date
- Parco degli Acquedotti
- Ancient Roman technology
- Roman engineering

Preceded by Aqua Alexandrina	Landmarks of Rome; Aqua Anio Vetus	Succeeded by Aqua Claudia
