= List of Roman aqueducts =

There are several lists of Roman aqueducts:

- List of aqueducts in the city of Rome
  - List of aqueducts in the city of Rome by date
- List of aqueducts in the Roman Empire

== See also ==
- List of aqueducts
