= Aqua Marcia =

Ancient Roman aqueduct, built 144–140 BC

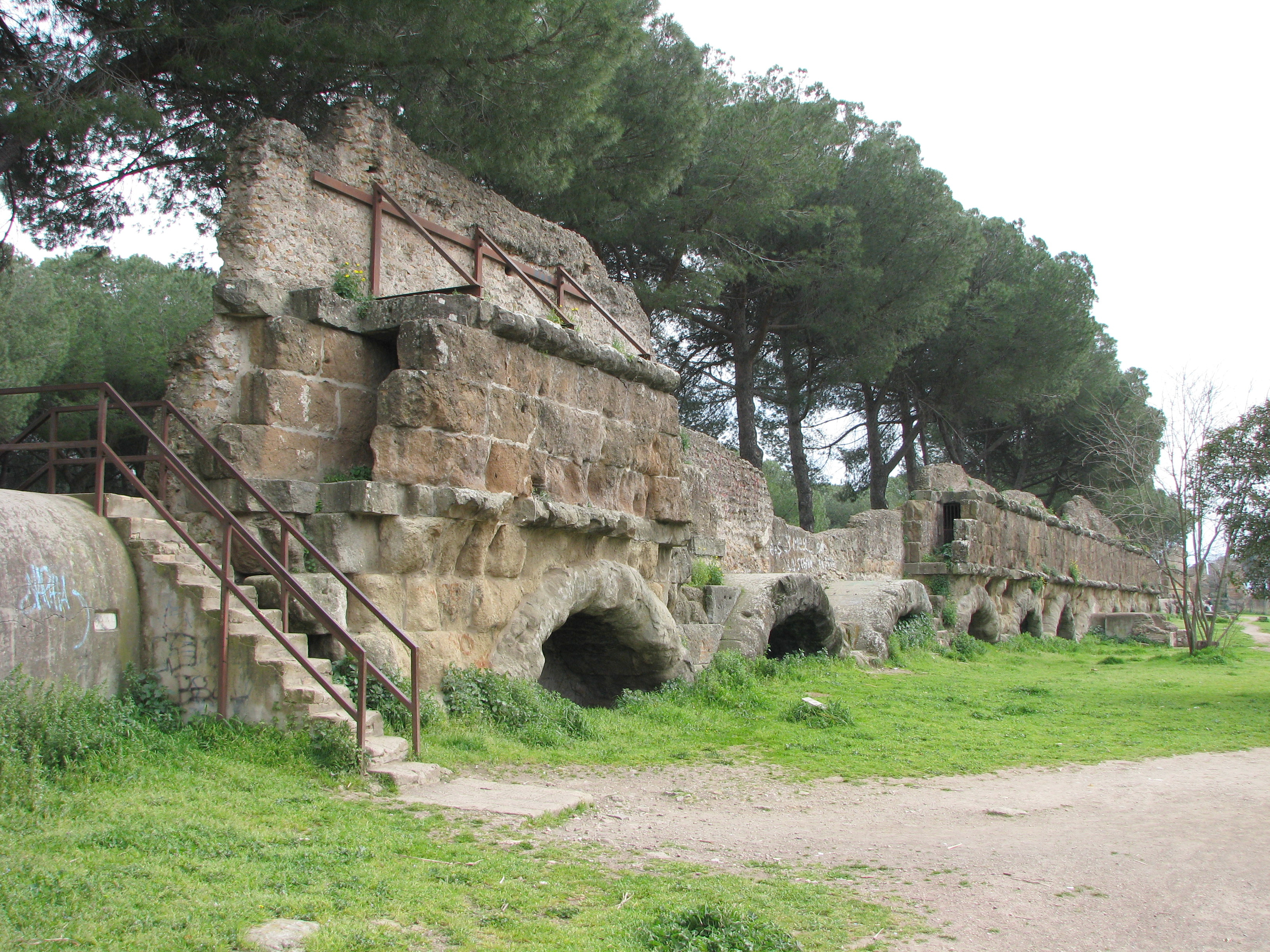
- Surviving arches of the Aqua Marcia in the Parco degli Acquedotti

- Location within Italy
- 41.8468°N 12.5633°E
- Type: Roman aqueduct / Hydraulic engineering
- Periods: Roman Republic, Roman Empire, Late antiquity
- Cultures: Roman
- Satellite of: Roman Republic, Roman Empire
- Location: From the upper Anio Valley to Rome, Italy
- Region: Latium / Metropolitan City of Rome Capital
- Part of: Water supply system of ancient Rome

History
- Built: 144–140 B.C.
- Built by: Quintus Marcius Rex (praetor)
- Abandoned: 6th century A.D. (cut during the Gothic Wars)

Site notes
- Material: Tufa, opus caementicium, brick, peperino stone
- Height: Up to 30 m (98 ft) on bridge and high-arch sections
- Length: 91 km (57 mi)
- Excavation dates: Mapped and documented across extensive modern archaeological surveys
- Archaeologists: Esther Boise Van Deman, Thomas Ashby
- Condition: Partially ruined (substantial monumental stretches visible in Rome's Aqueduct Park)
- Owner: State property
- Management: Parco Regionale dell'Appia Antica / Soprintendenza Speciale Archeologia Belle Arti e Paesaggio di Roma
- Public access: Yes

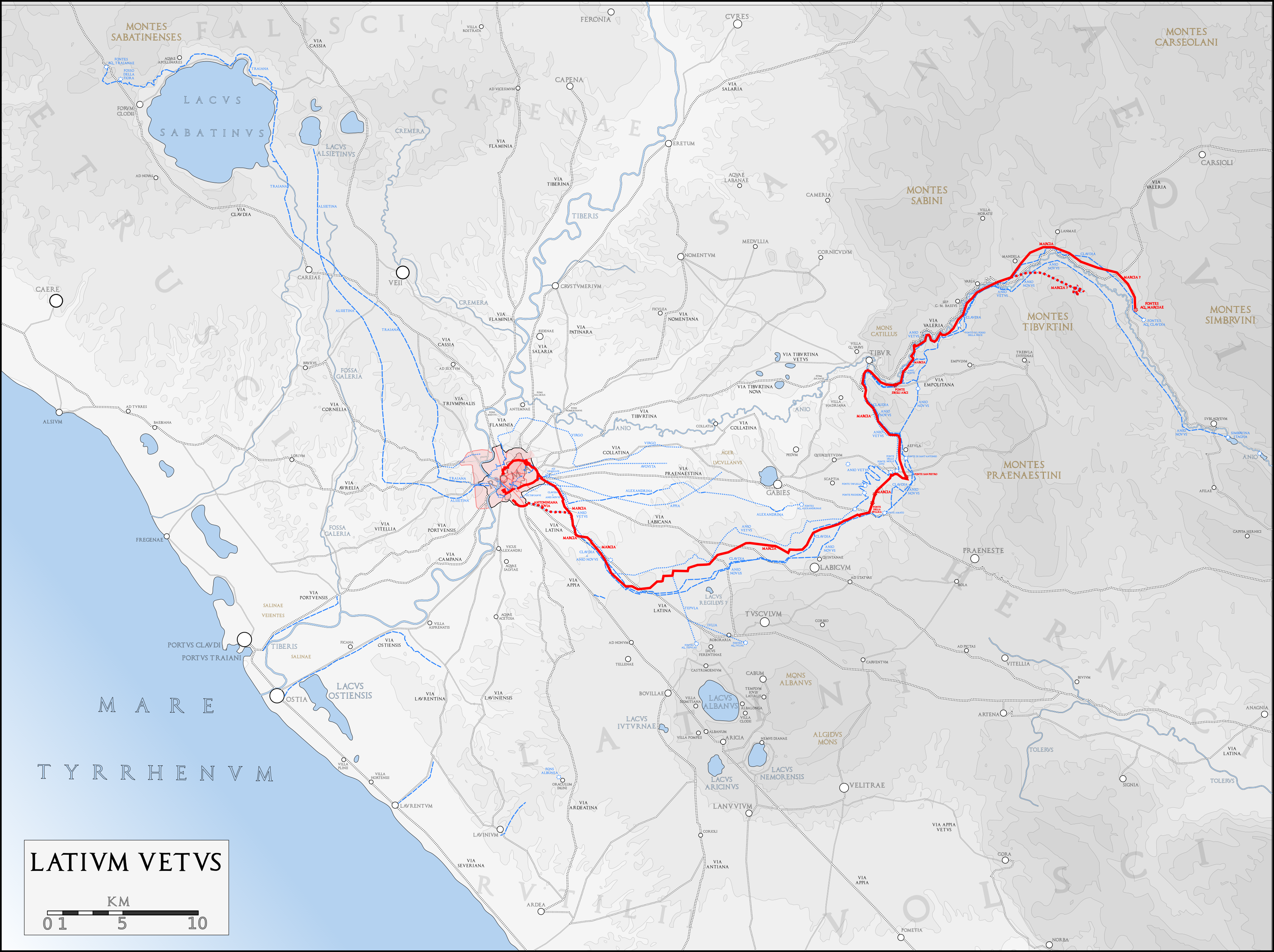
Route of the Aqua Marcia

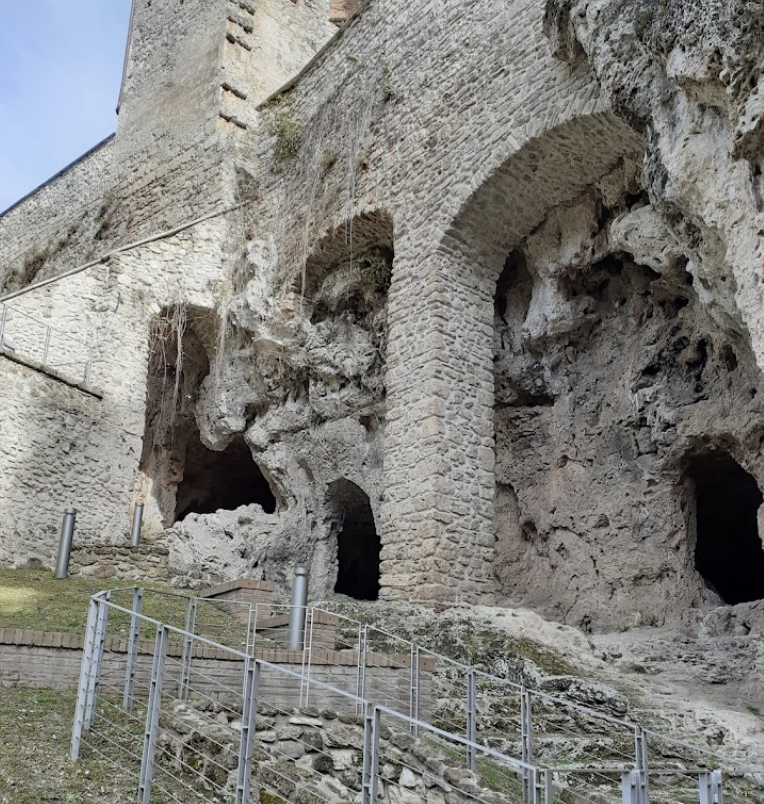
Near Eremo di San Benedetto. Vicovaro

The Aqua Marcia (Italian: Acqua Marcia) is a 91 km (57 mi) long Roman aqueduct, and the longest of eleven aqueducts that supplied the city of Rome. The aqueduct was built between 144–140 BC. The still-functioning Acqua Felice from 1586 runs on long stretches along the route of the Aqua Marcia.

Together with the Aqua Anio Vetus, Aqua Anio Novus and Aqua Claudia, it was an exceptional technical achievement and is regarded as one of the "four great aqueducts of Rome."

Although the source of the aqueduct was further downstream than the Anio Novus, technical progress allowed the later Anio Novus to use more bridges to shorten its path instead of following contour lines as the Marcia does.

It was the first to enter Rome on arches, which were used for the last 11 km (6.8 mi), and which were also used later combined with the Aqua Tepula and Aqua Julia.

== History ==
At the beginning of the 2nd century BC, the first two aqueducts of Rome (Aqua Appia and Aqua Anio Vetus) had become dilapidated and many illegal diversions decreased the flow so much that in 184 BC the censor Cato the Elder passed laws to remove illegal pipes and supplies to private individuals.

Nevertheless flow rates were still too low to meet growing demand, so the Senate decided to build a new aqueduct, longer and more ambitious than the previous ones, bringing water to the Capitoline Hill, a technical feat for the time due to its height. The praetor Quintus Marcius Rex (an ancestor of Julius Caesar) was entrusted with supervision of the work, for whom it is named and whose judiciary role was extended for the completion of the work. It was largely paid for by spoils from the recent Roman conquests of Corinth in 146 BC and the destruction of Carthage at the end of the Third Punic War, in the same year.

Its extension to the Capitoline Hill caused controversy because traditionalists were concerned about a passage in the Sibylline Books warning against bringing water there and in 140 BC the case was brought before the Senate who rejected it.

It was repaired for the first time in 33 BC by Agrippa then was largely rebuilt by Augustus between 11 and 4 BC following a report of the consuls Quintus Aelius Tubero and Paullus Fabius Maximus. This restoration is commemorated by an inscription placed on the arch spanning the Via Tiburtina, later integrated into the Aurelian Wall. Augustus also augmented the supply by linking it to an additional source, called Augusta after its donor, 800 roman paces—ca. 1,100 m (3,600 ft)—away from the original source.

Much of its supply was eventually siphoned off by private citizens for their own use, making it effectively only a trickle in the city by the time of Nero. The supply was increased again by later emperors. Frontinus measured the flow of the Aqua Marcia at its source around AD 97 as 4690 quinariae, making it the second-greatest source of the city's water. Modern estimates of size of one quinaria vary over a wide range, from 10,000 L (2,600 US gal; 2,200 imp gal) to 76,800 L (20,300 US gal; 16,900 imp gal) of water a day, giving the Aqua Marcia a flow rate of 46,900,000 L (12,400,000 US gal; 10,300,000 imp gal) to 360,192,000 L (95,153,000 US gal; 79,231,000 imp gal) of water a day.

The branch to the Caelian Hill and the Aventine Hill was rebuilt completely during the rule of Trajan. Trajan's successor Hadrian restored parts of the aqueduct. Later restorations were also made during the joint rule of Septimius and Caracalla in 196 AD, the latter commissioning further work on the aqueduct during his (later) sole rule. Caracalla added another source for the aqueduct as well, to supply baths he also built. It is possible that Diocletian too commissioned restoration works on the aqueduct after building the Baths of Diocletian, and the last work on the aqueduct probably took place while Arcadius ruled the Eastern Emprire and Honorius was the emperor of the West.

== Route ==
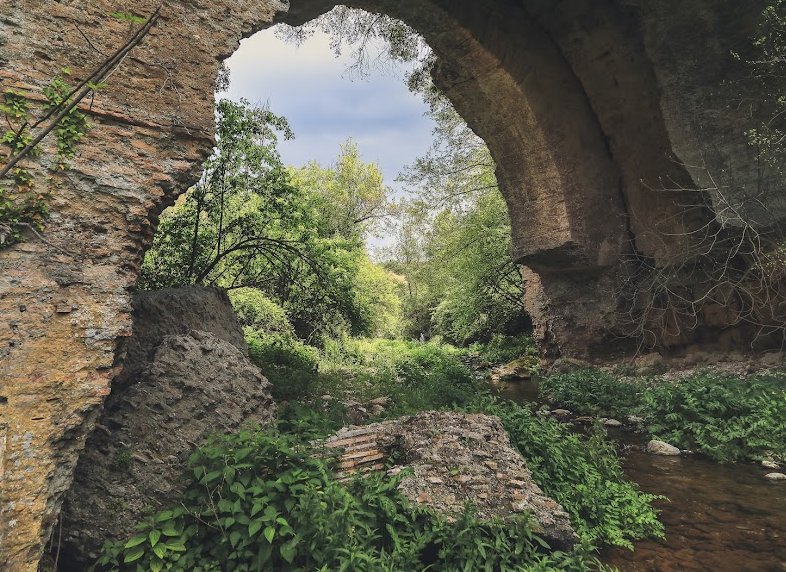
Ponte San Pietro

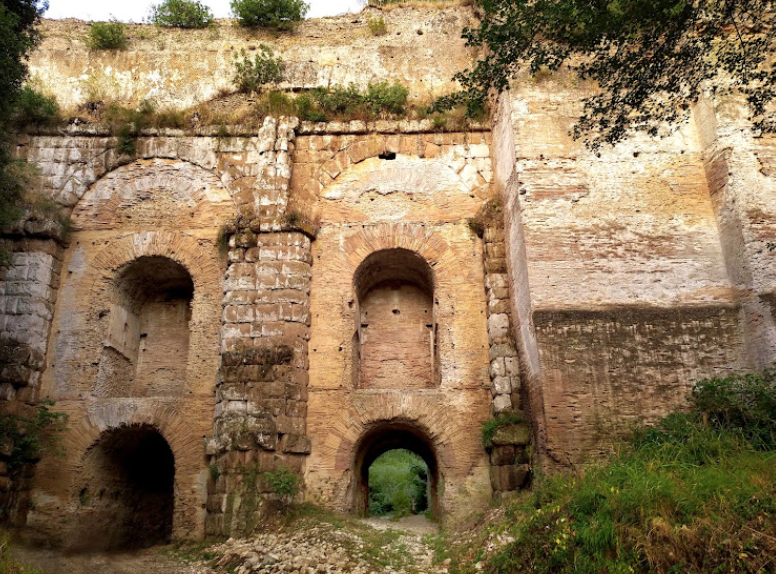
Ponte Lupo

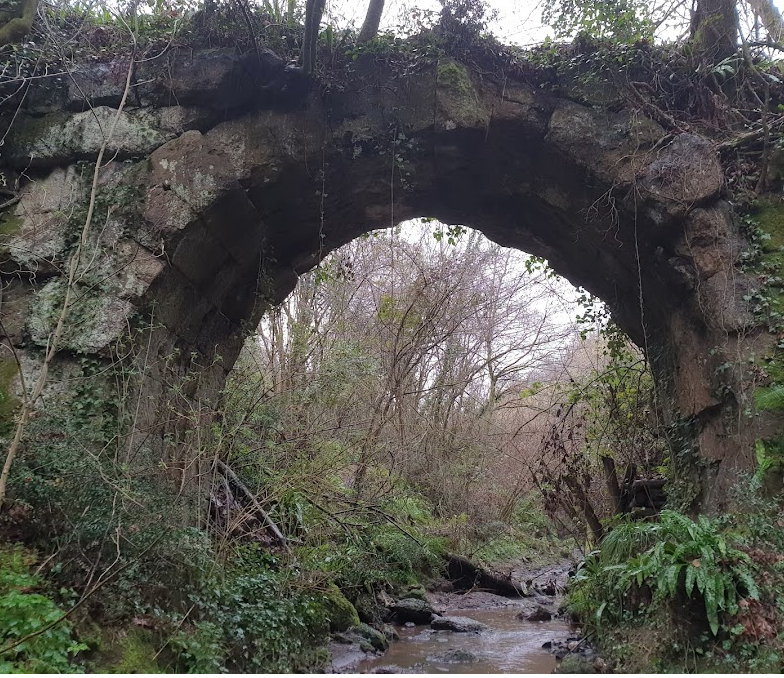
Ponte della Bullica

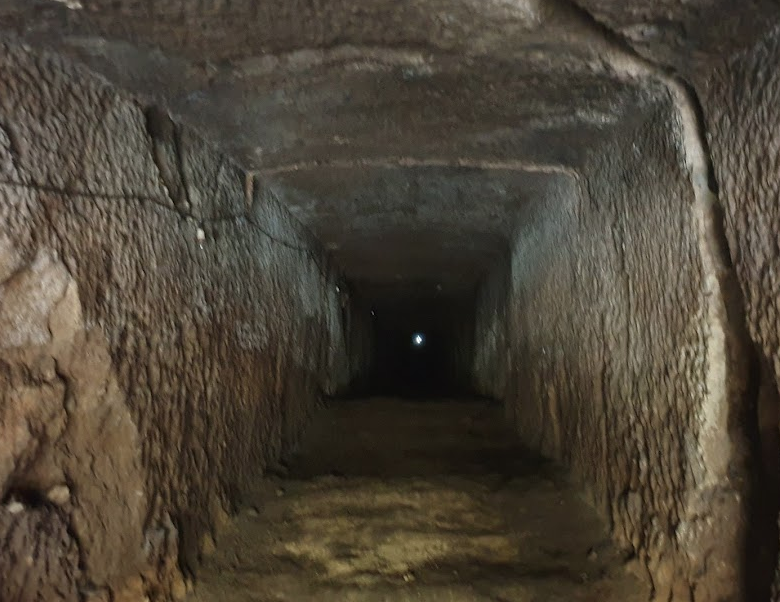
Tunnel della Bullica

The ancient source for the aqueduct was near where small lakes were formed by two springs in the Anio valley between the modern towns of Arsoli and Marano Equo. This general locale, in hills to the east of Rome, was also used for other aqueducts including the Anio Vetus, Anio Novus, and Aqua Claudia. The Aqua Marcia was well known for its cold and pure waters and the same source is used today to supply the modern aqueduct.

The route was mainly underground for the first 80 km after which it emerged on large monumental arches to ensure there was a good water head (pressure) for distribution in Rome. The initial stretch of the aqueduct flanked the right bank of the river Anio, crossing it with a bridge just before Vicovaro and joining the route of the Aqua Anio Vetus (at a lower altitude). It continued towards Tivoli and then, bypassing the Tiburtini Mountains and after the current municipality of Gericomio it crossed the Gallicano area and the via Praenestina in Lazio with alternating bridges (of which many are visible) and underground sections. After the Capannelle area it headed directly to Rome and surfaced at the seventh mile of the Via Latina, where there was a limaria pool (settling basin). From here a stretch of about 9 km arches flanked the Via Latina and reached Rome in the locality ad spem veterem, near Porta Maggiore, where other aqueducts met.

From here it followed the future Aurelian Walls until it crossed Via Tiburtina on an arch later transformed into Porta Tiburtina. The route passed the Viminal gate, where Termini Station stands today, and ended near the Collina gate, where the main castellum aquae for distribution stood, near the current Via XX Settembre. The main branch of the subsequent network (which covered 2/3 of the city) reached the Quirinal and then the Capitol, while a secondary branch (rivus Herculaneus), which started from the Tiburtina gate, served the Caelian and the Aventine.

=== Bridges ===
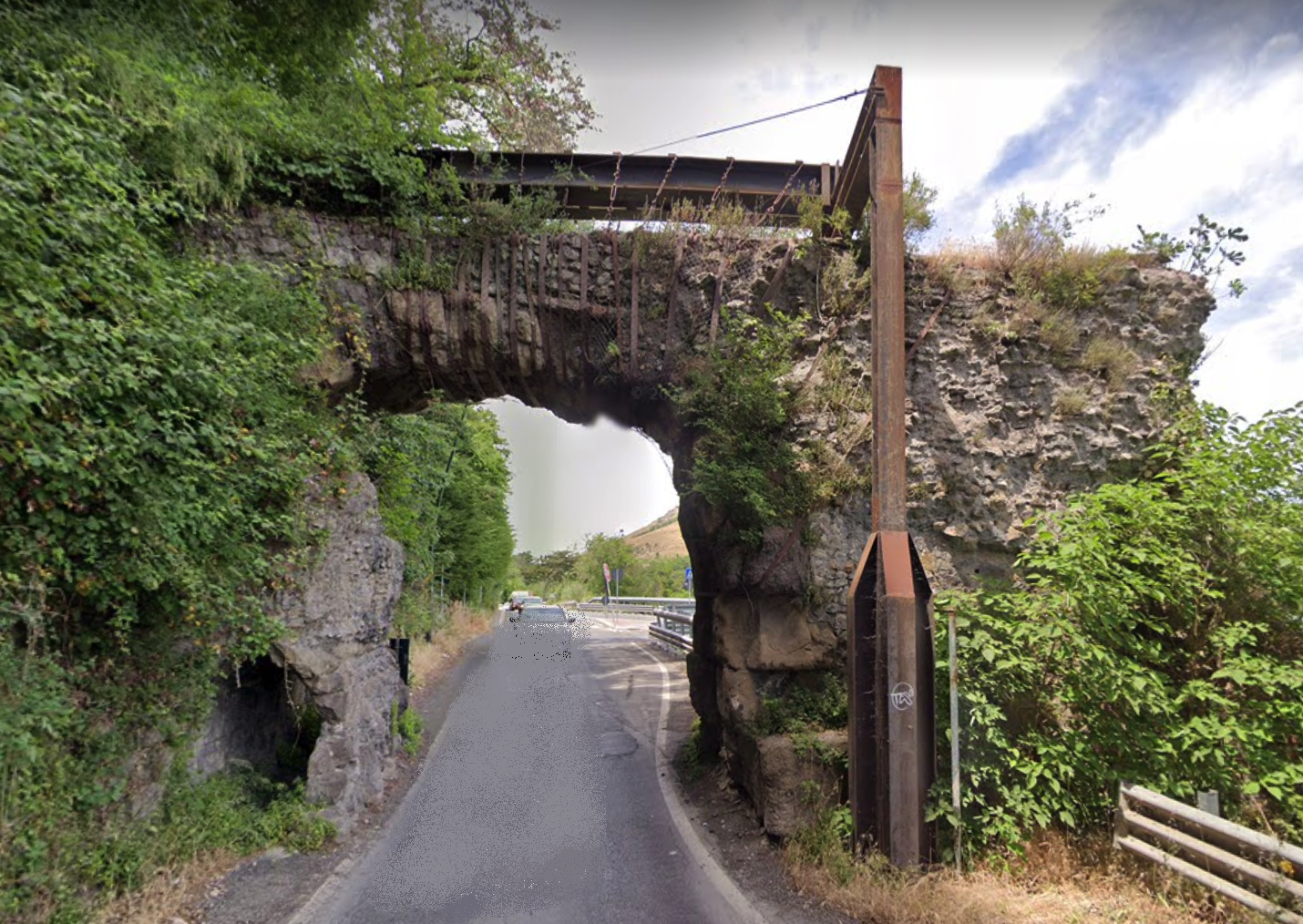
Aqua Marcia bridge at Ponte degli Arci, Tivoli

Aqueduct Marcia bridges visible today include: Ponte San Pietro, Ponte Lupo, Ponte Caipoli, Ponte della Bullica, Ponte degli Arci.

==== Ponte San Pietro ====
With its enormous central arch 16 m wide, it is an impressive bridge over the Mola stream. It was originally built in ashlars of local, porous calcareous stone. The abutments, 3.84 m wide at the base, gradually decreased to 2.77 m which must have had beautiful effect. The north-west side probably included a smaller arch while the south-east side had three small arches. It underwent reinforcement under Titus or Hadrian when it was entirely covered in cement and the entire south-east end was rebuilt.

==== Ponte Lupo ====
The Ponte Lupo is considered one of the most famous and interesting bridges of the Roman aqueducts; to allow the Aqua Marcia to cross the deep Aniene Valley on its way to Rome it had to be more than 30 m high and over 80 m long. Along its top ran a road which joined the two sides. The bridge was built in 144 BC as part of the Aqua Marcia.

It is located on the private estate of San Giovanni in Campo Orazio.

==== Ponte Caipoli ====
Ponte Caipoli carried the aqueduct originally on a single large arch fromm 144 BC which was later replaced by a double brick arch over the Caipoli stream at a height of 13 m. The bridge underwent numerous restorations in the following centuries which are still clearly visible on the abutments and the vault. Between the Ponte Caipoli and the Ponte della Bullica the tunnel is dug into the tuff about 1.2 m wide and 200 m long and can still be seen, following a tortuous route.

==== Ponte della Bullica ====
The Ponte della Bullica crosses the Collafri stream with a single round arch in radial tuff ashlars with a span of 5.8 m and is 5.5 m high, 3.3 m wide and 10.6 m long. It dates to the Augustan age without ever having undergone radical restorations. On the tuff banks on either side are Roman rooms about 30 m from the bridge for maintenance workers.

On the southwest bank is a service tunnel (the Bullica tunnel). The tunnel is about 230 m long, wide enough for vehicles and was built at the same time as the aqueduct. Every 30–40 m are vertical inspection shafts (putei) for access to the aqueduct below, which made the shafts shorter than if they had to reach the surface, and allowed easier extraction of material and maintenance by wagons crossing Collafri hill.

== See also ==
- Ancient Roman technology
- Parco degli Acquedotti
- Roman engineering
- List of aqueducts in the city of Rome
- List of aqueducts in the Roman Empire
- List of Roman aqueducts by date

== Bibliography ==
- Coarelli, Filippo, Guida Archeologica di Roma, Arnoldo Mondadori Editore, Milano, 1989.
- Claridge, Amanda, Rome: An Oxford Archaeological Guide, Oxford University Press, New York, 1998
- Stambaugh, John E (1988). The Ancient Roman City. Johns Hopkins University Press. p. 395. ISBN 9780801836923.
