= Quintus Marcius Rex =

Quintus Marcius Rex was a name used by men of the gens Marcia in Ancient Rome. They belonged to the Marcii Reges, a family who were the relatives of Julius Caesar through his grandmother Marcia.

- Quintus Marcius Rex, praetor in 144 BC, famously known for the Aqua Marcia aqueduct which he constructed and was named after him.
- Quintus Marcius Q. f. Q. n. Rex, consul in 118 BC, paternal great-uncle of Julius Caesar.
- Quintus Marcius Q. f. (Q. n.) Rex, consul in 68 BC, grandson of the consul in 118 BC and a second cousin of Julius Caesar, also a brother-in-law of Publius Clodius Pulcher.

== Sources ==
- Smith, William (1842). Dictionary of Greek and Roman Biography and Mythology.
