= Aqua Alsietina =

Roman aqueduct

Coordinates: 41°53′12″N 12°28′10″E

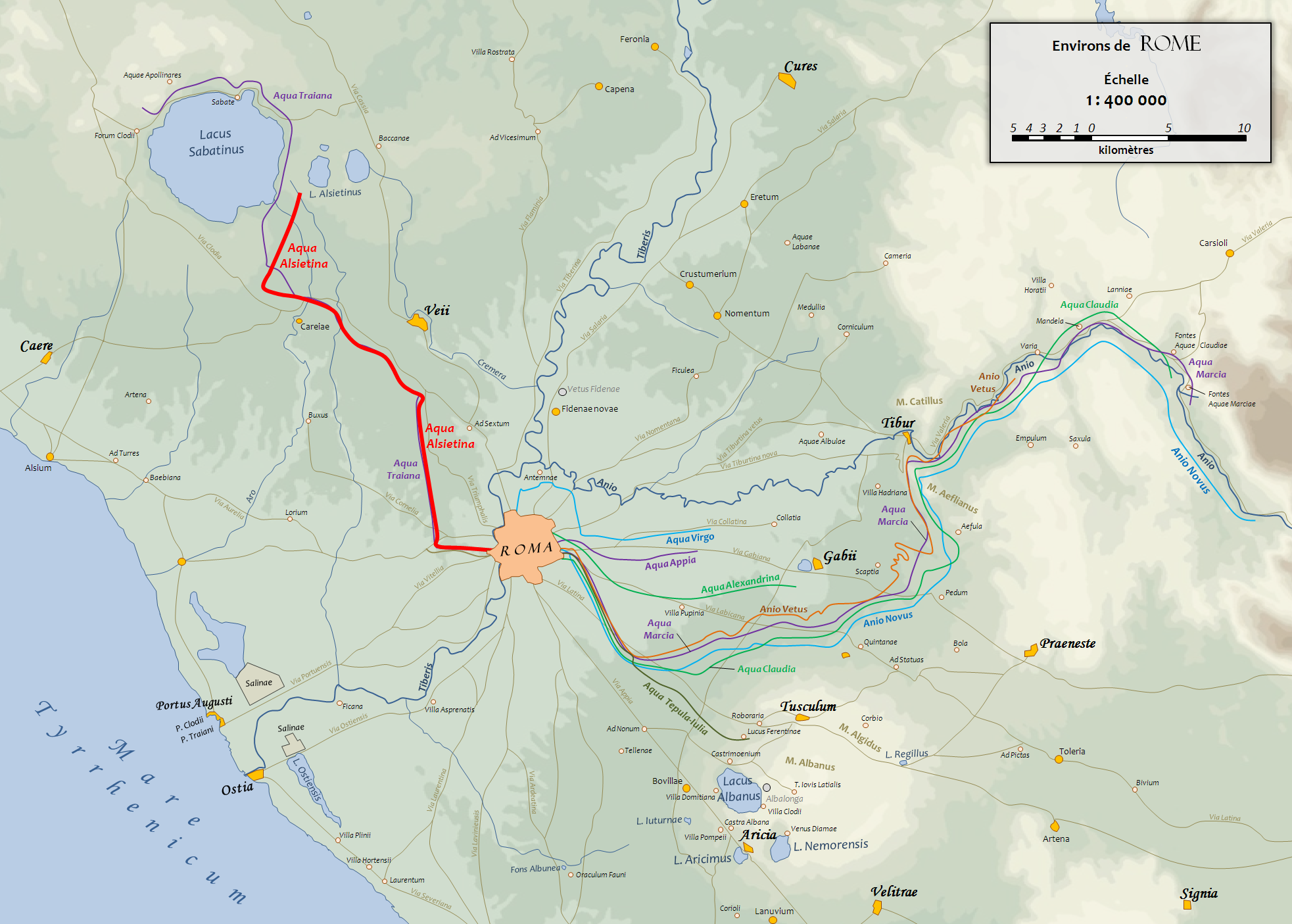
Map of Aqua Alsietina

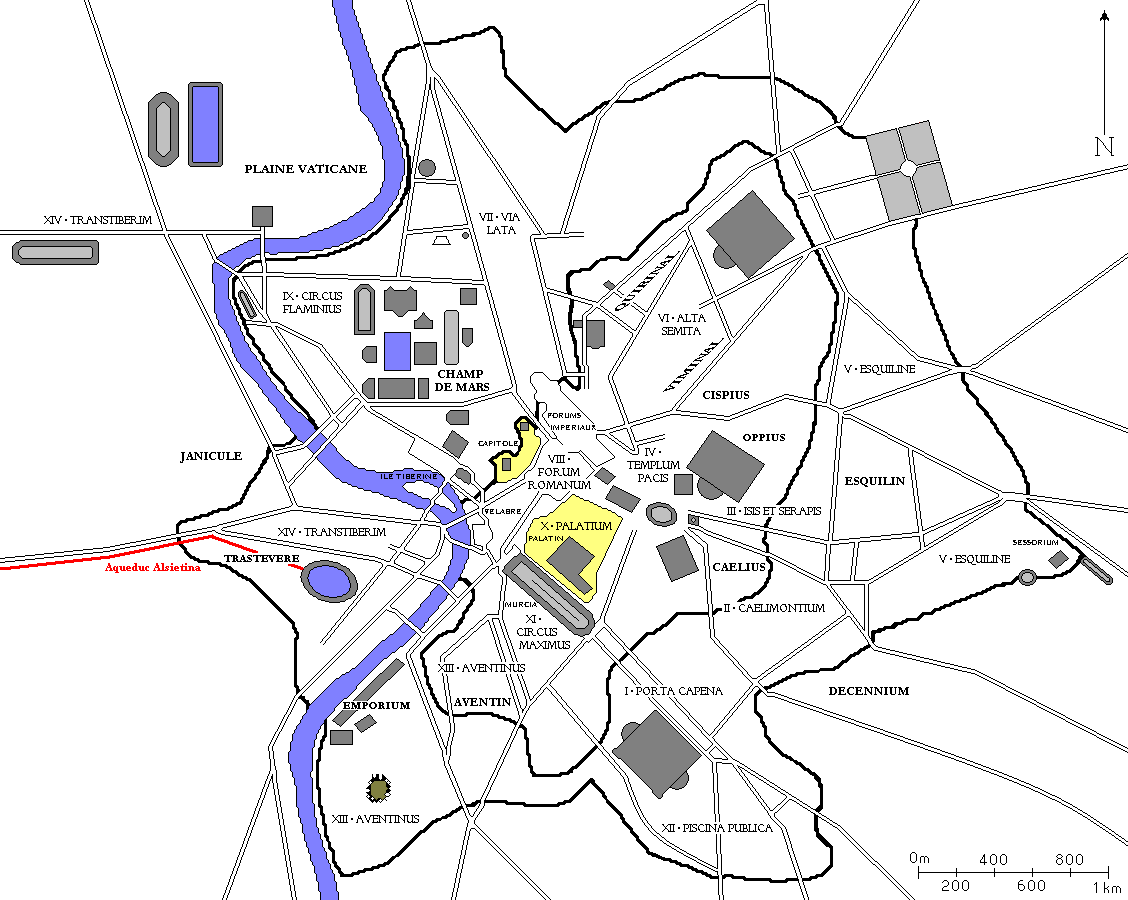
Map inside Rome

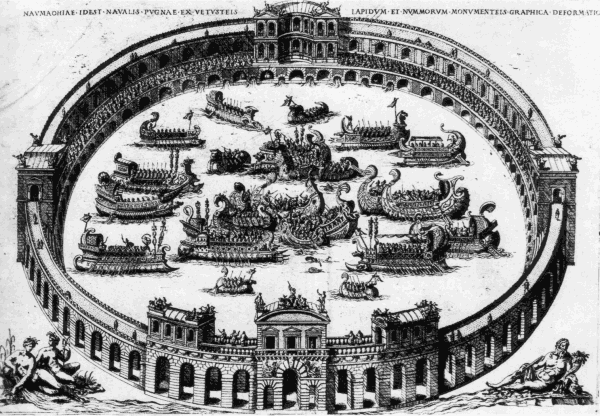
An example of an ancient Roman naumachium

The Aqua Alsietina is an ancient Roman aqueduct, erected sometime around 2 BC during the reign of emperor Augustus, and described in the De aquaeductu of the Roman official Frontinus. Because the aqueduct was constructed under Augustan rule, it was also called Aqua Auqusta. The aqueduct was the earlier of the two western Roman aqueducts, the other being the aqua Traiana. It was the only water supply for the Transtiberine region, on the right bank of the river Tiber until the Aqua Traiana was built.

The daily discharge of Aqua Alsietina was 15,680 m^{3} (20,510 cu yd), though by the 1st century AD the flow was not much more than a trickle. The length of aqueduct was 22,172 paces -- ca. 33 km (21 mi), and within the Rome city proper it ran either completely or mostly underground. Along its route, it had arches over 358 paces -- ca. 530 m (1,740 ft).

This aqueduct acquired water mainly from Lacus Alsietinus, the modern Lake Martignano. Frontinus observes that this water was not suitable for drinking, however, and the aqueduct was built mainly to supply, and fill, an artificial water basin used to stage naval battles, naumachia, for public entertainment. Only when other aqueducts serving the Transtiberine parts of the city were not in use was water from Aqua Alsietina used as an emergency supply. Any surplus water granted to private irrigation use and for irrigation of gardens around naumachia.

It was joined by the aqua Traiana, probably in 109 AD, to share a common lower path into Rome, though their routes are uncertain.

Some traces of this aqueduct were discovered in 1720. An inscribed stone slab was found in 1887 near the Via Claudia, the only epigraphic record of the Aqua Alsietina.

The fountain of the Acqua Paola in Rome, built under Pope Paul V announces on its triumphal arch that "Paul V restored the ancient ducts of the Aqua Alsietina". But this was wrong, in fact it was a reconstruction of the Aqua Traiana. But that was unknown by that time.

== See also ==
- List of aqueducts in the city of Rome
- List of aqueducts in the Roman Empire
- List of Roman aqueducts by date
- Parco degli Acquedotti
- Ancient Roman technology
- Roman engineering
- Naumachia of Augustus
