= Aqua Anio Novus =

Ancient Roman aqueduct in Italy

Coordinates: 41°53′29″N 12°30′55″E

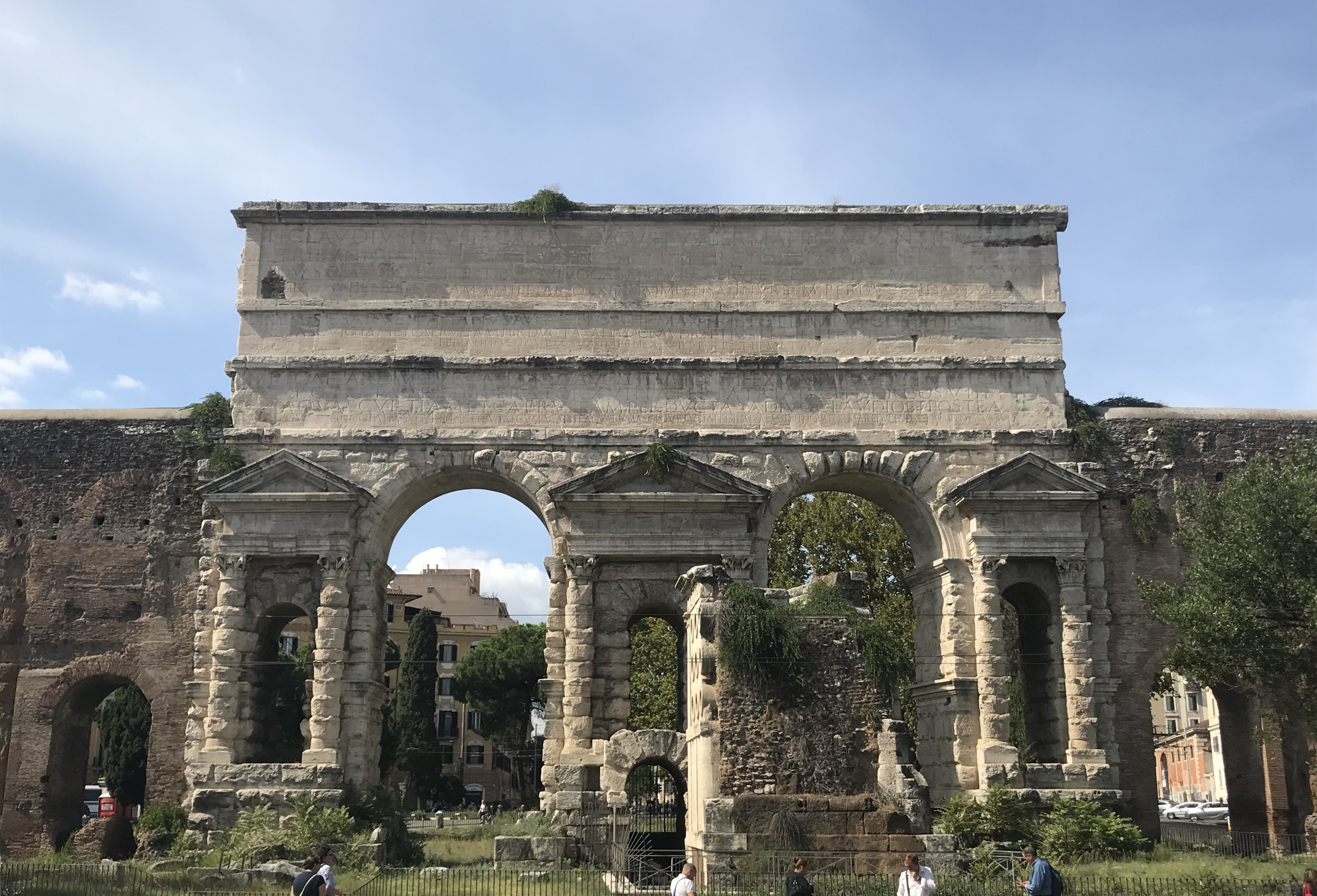
Porta Maggiore in Rome: remains of aqueducts Aqua Claudia and Aqua Anio Novus, integrated into the Aurelian Wall as a gate in 271 AD.

Aqua Anio Novus (Latin for "New Anio aqueduct") was an ancient Roman aqueduct supplying the city of Rome. Like the Aqua Claudia, it was begun by emperor Caligula in 38 AD and completed in 52 AD by Claudius, who dedicated them both on August 1. The aqueduct—together with the Aqua Anio Vetus, Aqua Marcia and Aqua Claudia—is regarded as one of the four great aqueducts of Rome.

The quality of water Aqua Anio Novus delivered to the city of Rome left much to be desired, and before Frontinus' reforms of the water supply system its waters were used to supplement the flow of other aqueducts when needed—rendering waters in those too torpid in the process.

== History ==
The building of Aqua Anio Novus was lacking in quality, and it required repairs after a few decades of use. In or around 71 AD the aqueduct was extensively restored by Vespasian. Further repairs took place during the reign of Trajan, and smaller repairs were made during Hadrian's reign as well. The aqueduct was again restored while the Severan dynasty was in power, in 201 AD. After 201 AD and before 381 AD many repairs were made to the Aqua Anio Novus, albeit they can not be dated exactly.

== Route ==
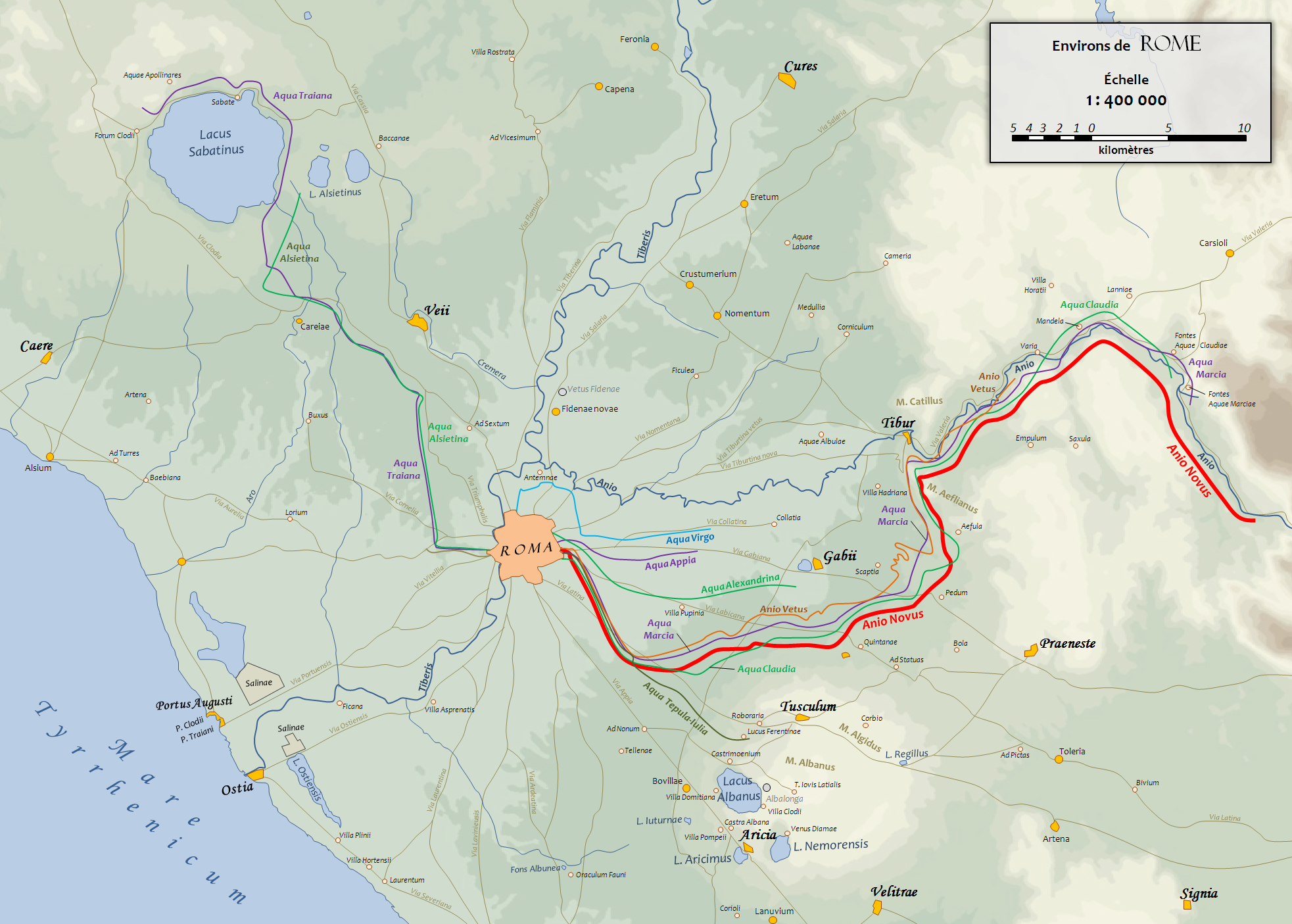
Route of the aqueduct outside of Rome

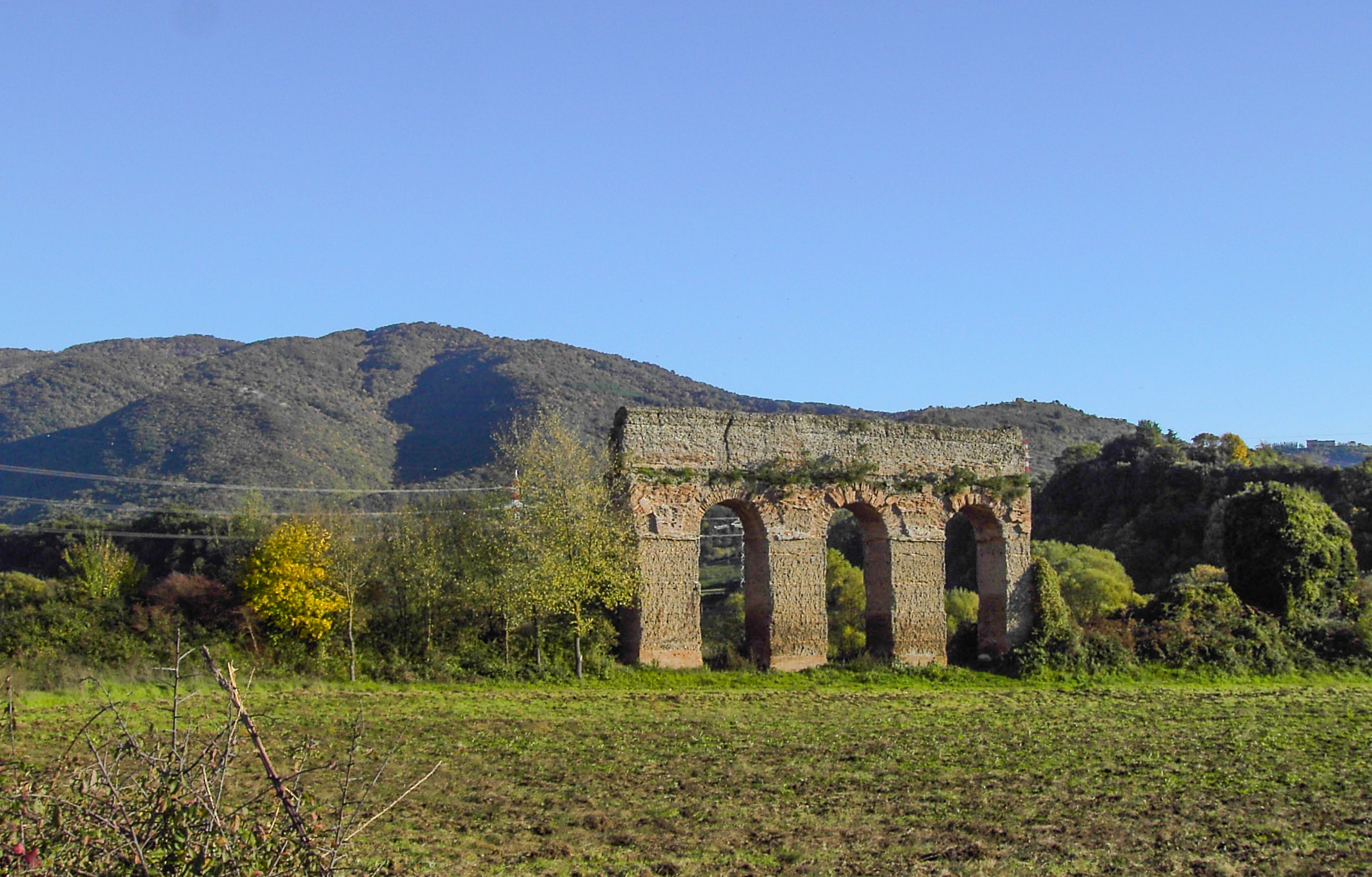
The side branch near Tivoli

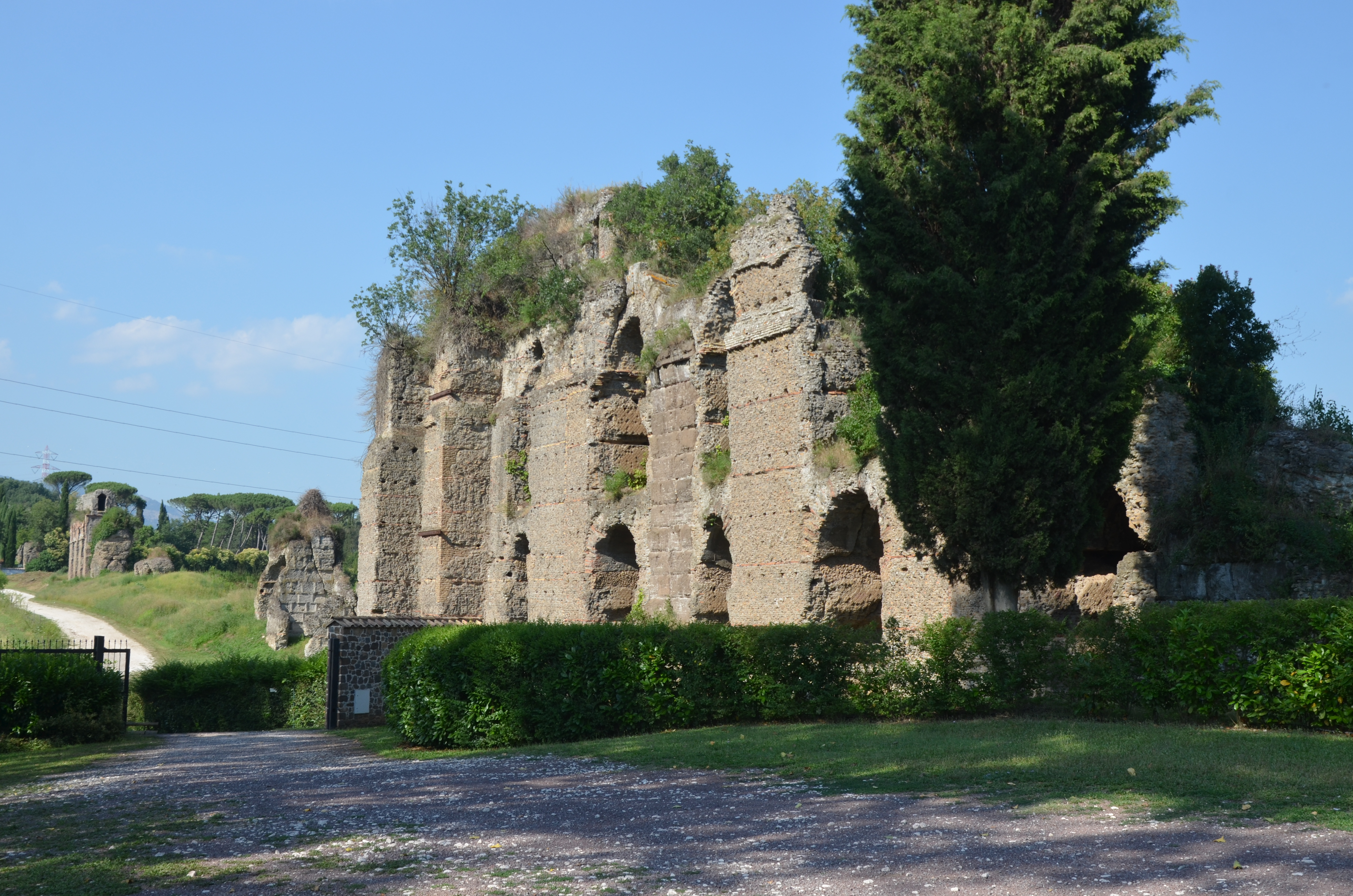
The side branch near Tivoli

Frontinus describes its source as near that of the Aqua Claudia and "forty-second milestone on the via Sublacensis, in the district of Simbruvium. The water is taken from the river which, even without the effect of rainstorms, is muddy and discoloured, because it has rich and cultivated fields adjoining it and in consequence loose banks." Its flow at the intake was 197,000 m^{3} a day. The aqueduct was freely used to supply the deficiencies of other aqueducts by using cross-channels at several points along the route controlled by sluice gates, and being turbid, rendered them impure.

To improve the quality of the water Trajan connected additional sources from the two uppermost of the three lakes formed by Nero for the adornment of his villa at Subiaco, thus lengthening the aqueduct to 58 miles and 700 paces. The lakes were created by dams in the river, and were the tallest of any built by the Romans. They were swept away by the river in the Medieval period.

The aqueduct was split into two channels above Tivoli and combined again near Gericomo. From its filtering tank near the seventh milestone of the Via Latina, it was carried on the arches of the Aqua Claudia, in a channel immediately superposed on the latter. It terminated at a great tank on the Esquiline Hill near the temple of Minerva Medica.

The Aqua Anio Novus had the highest water level of all the aqueducts that came into Rome which allowed it to reach the highest districts, but also necessitated a route that was higher than the others with taller bridges.

It was built of tuff and brick.

=== Bridges ===
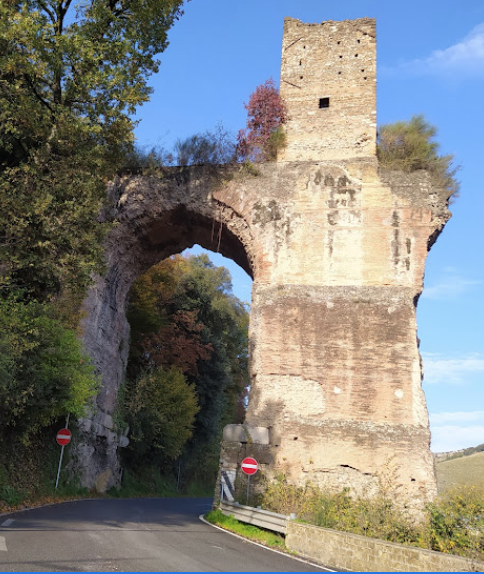
Ponte degli Arci

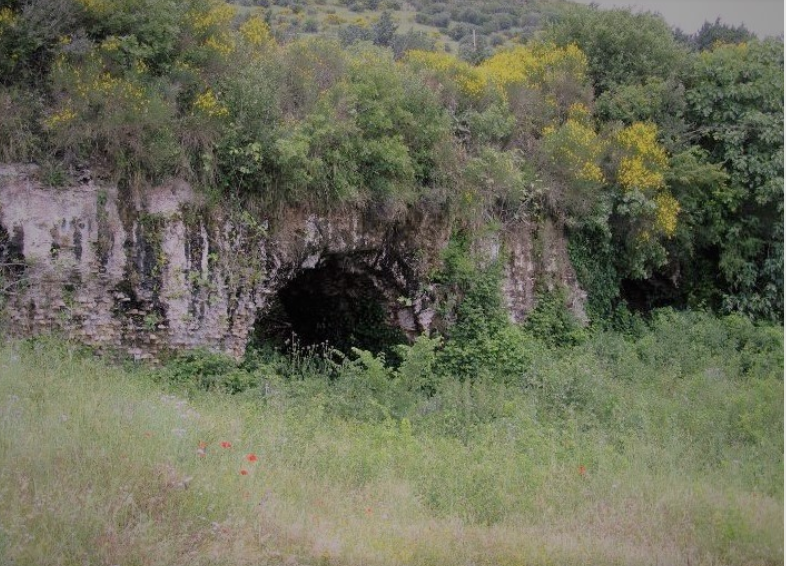
Ponte Arcinelli

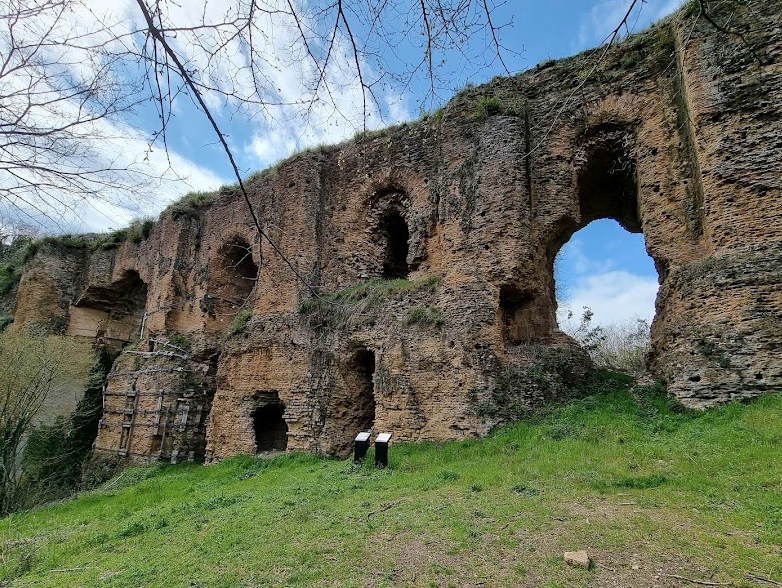
Ponte San Antonio

Aqua Anio Novus bridges visible today include: Ponte degli Arci, Ponte Arcinelli, Ponte Sant Antonio and Ponte Barucelli.

==== Ponte Sant Antonio ====
The Ponte S. Antonio is considered one of the most beautiful bridges of aqueducts supplying Rome. It crosses the Acqua Raminga stream and is named after an ancient sanctuary now disappeared.

The central and original nucleus of the bridge was of opus quadratum, of which the imposing central arch stands out, 32 m high and 10 m span. Spurs are visible on the various pylons, which were used to hook and support the scaffolding both during the construction of the bridge, but above all during the numerous restorations. In the post-Severan period it was reinforced by covering it almost completely with brick-clad opus caementicium and adding small arches at the bottom of the bridge.

On the east side of the bridge, on the south pillar near the stream, is a part of a supporting arch never completed, a sign that the bridge underwent several design changes during its construction. On the west side of the bridge, the channel turns at right angles and can be followed for several tens of metres.

==== Ponte Barucelli ====
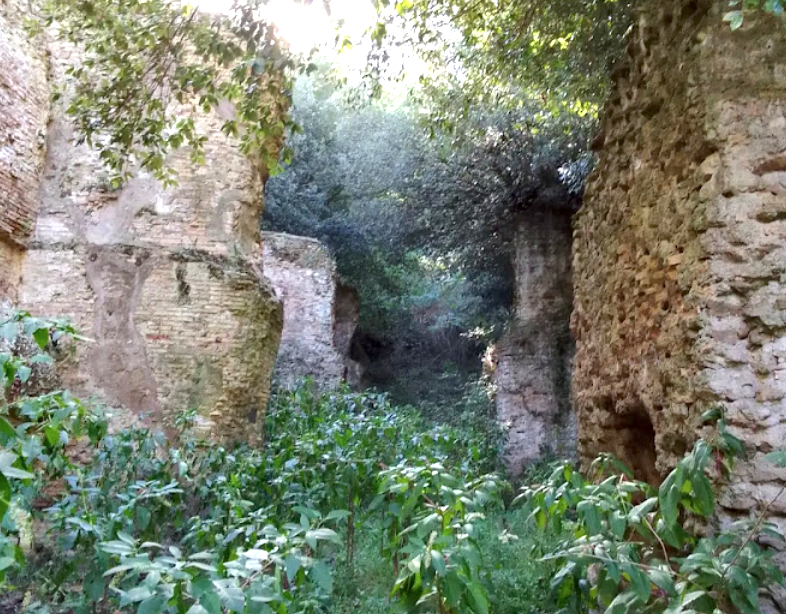
Ponte Barucelli

The Ponte Barucelli (also known as Ponte Diruto) is made up of two monumental bridges 8 m apart for the Anio Novus (to the south) and the aqua Claudia (to the north) to cross the Acqua Nera stream. Both date to between 38 and 52 AD. They were later strengthened with buttresses and reinforcements, becoming two huge continuous and connected structures.

The Anio Novus bridge, about 85 m long and about 10 m wide, has a few small arches except for the main high and narrow one for the Acqua Nera. It had originally been built of tuff in opus quadratum. In the second half of the 1st century it was reinforced in opus mixtum, visible at the two east end buttresses. At the beginning of the 3rd century nine rectangular buttresses were added at regular intervals on the north side while on the south side only three were added near the bed of the stream, later increased by five on the west bank in poor opus latericium and two on the east in opus mixtum.

Later the two bridges were connected by three brick arches and with buttresses.

== See also ==
- List of aqueducts in the city of Rome
- List of aqueducts in the Roman Empire
- List of Roman aqueducts by date
- Parco degli Acquedotti
- Ancient Roman technology
- Roman engineering
