= List of aqueducts in the city of Rome by date =

This is a list of aqueducts in the city of Rome listed in chronological order of their construction.

== Ancient Rome ==
| Name | Built | Water source | Length |
|---|---|---|---|
| Aqua Appia | 312 BCE | springs 10 miles (16 km) to the east of Rome | 10 miles (16 km); underground from its source for 7 miles (11 km), then on arches for 3 miles (4.8 km) to its terminus in the Forum Boarium in Campus Martius |
| Aqua Anio Vetus | 272–269 BCE | Aniene river near Vicovaro, east of Rome | 40 miles (64 km); underground channel of stone from its source to its terminus on the Viminal Hill |
| Aqua Marcia | 144–140 BCE | springs near Subiaco, east of Rome | 56 miles (90 km); underground for 50 miles (80 km) from its source, then on arches for 6 miles (9.7 km) to its terminus on the Capitoline Hill; later piped to the baths of Caracalla on the Caelian Hill, then to the Aventine Hill and the Quirinal Hill |
| Aqua Tepula | 125 BCE | springs near Subiaco, east of Rome | 11 miles (18 km); underground for 5 miles (8.0 km) from its source, then on the same arches as those of the Aqua Marcia for 6 miles (9.7 km) to its terminus on the Aventine Hill |
| Aqua Julia | 33 BCE | springs near Subiaco, east of Rome | 14 miles (23 km); underground for 7 miles (11 km) from its source, then on the same arches as those of the Aqua Marcia and Aqua Tepula to its terminus on the Aventine Hill |
| Aqua Virgo | 19 BCE | springs near Via Collatina, east of Rome | 14 miles (23 km); underground for 7 miles (11 km) from its source, then on arches for 7 miles (11 km) to its terminus at the baths of Agrippa in Campus Martius |
| Aqua Alsietina | 2 BCE | Lake Alsietina, now Lake Martignano, northwest of Rome | 14 miles (23 km); underground for 13 3/4 miles from its source, then on arches for 1/4-mile to its terminus at the Naumachia of Augustus in Transtiberim (Trastevere) |
| Aqua Claudia | AD 52 | springs in Subiaco, east of Rome | 43 miles (69 km); underground for 34 miles (55 km) from its source, then on arches for 9 miles (14 km) to its terminus on the Caelian Hill; later piped to the imperial palaces from the mid-first century on the Palatine Hill |
| Aqua Anio Novus | AD 52 | Aniene river, east of Rome | 54 miles (87 km); underground for 46 miles (74 km) from its source, then on arches for 8 miles (13 km), entering Rome at Porta Maggiore, atop the channel of Aqua Claudia to its terminus on the Caelian Hill |
| Aqua Traiana | AD 109 | springs to the north of Lake Bracciano, northwest of Rome | 35 miles (56 km); underground for 29 miles (47 km) from its source, then on arches for 6 miles (9.7 km) to its terminus on the Janiculum Hill |
| Aqua Alexandrina | AD 226 | the Pantano springs near Via Prenestina, east of Rome | 14 miles (23 km); underground for 4 miles (6.4 km) from its source, then on arches for 10 miles (16 km) to its terminus at the baths of Alexander Severus in Campus Martius |

== Modern Rome ==
- Acqua Vergine Antica
  - built in 1453
  - source: springs in Salone, east of Rome
  - length: 8 miles (13 km); underground from its source to its terminus at the fountain of Trevi on the Quirinal Hill
- Acqua Felice
  - built in 1586
  - source: springs at Pantano Borghese, off Via Casilina
  - length: 15 miles (24 km); underground for 8 miles (13 km) from its source, in the channel of Aqua Alexandrina, then alternating on the arches of the Aqua Claudia and the Aqua Marcia for 7 miles (11 km) to its terminus at the fountain of Moses on the Quirinal Hill
- Acqua Paola
  - built in 1611
  - source: Lake Bracciano, northwest of Rome
  - length: 20 miles (32 km); underground for 12 miles (19 km) from its source, in the channel of Aqua Trajana, then on arches for 8 miles (13 km) to its terminus at the fountain of Paul V on the Janiculum Hill,
  - later piped to Vatican Hill
- Acqua Pia Antica Marcia
  - built in 1870
  - source: springs near Subiaco, east of Rome
  - length: 56 miles (90 km); underground for 50 miles (80 km) in the channel of Aqua Marcia, then on arches for 6 miles (9.7 km) to its terminus at the Fountain of the Naiads on the Viminal Hill
- Acqua Vergine Nuova
  - built in 1937
  - source: springs in Salone, east of Rome
  - length: 8 miles (13 km); underground from its source to its terminus at the fountains in Piazza del Popolo and the fountains on the western slope of the Pincio, overlooking Piazza del Popolo
- Acqua Peschiera
  - built in 1949
  - source: springs in Sorgenti, northeast of Rome
  - length: 60 miles (97 km); underground from its source, splitting into two branches:
    - Peschiera Sinistra, approaching Rome from the east
    - Peschiera Destra, taking a westward route, crossing the Tiber River at Poggio Mireto Scalo, about 30 miles north of Rome to its terminus at the fountain of Piazzale degli Eroi (Italian: Heroes' Square), just north of Vatican Hill
- Acqua Appio-Allesandrino
  - built in 1965
  - source: catchment basins along the volcano Angela at Pantano Borghese, Finocchi, Torre Angela

== See also ==
- Roman aqueduct
- List of aqueducts
- Parco degli Acquedotti
- Ancient Roman technology
- Roman engineering
- Frontinus

== Sources ==
- H.V. Morton (1966). The Waters of Rome. London: The Connoisseur and Michael Joseph.
- Rinne, Dr. Katherine Wentworth. "Aquae Urbis Romae: The Waters of the City of Rome". iath.virginia.edu. Archived from the original on 2007-04-23.
