= Quintus Marcius Rex (praetor 144 BC) =

Roman Politician

- Citizenship: Ancient Rome
- Occupation: Praetor
- Years active: 144–140 BC
- Era: Republic

Quintus Marcius Rex (fl. 2nd century BC) was a Roman politician of the Marcii Reges, a patrician family of gens Marcia, who claimed royal descent from the Roman King Ancus Marcius. He was a maternal great-grandfather of Julius Caesar.

He was appointed praetor peregrinus in 144 BC under the consulship of Servius Sulpicius Galba and Lucius Aurelius Cotta. The two major Roman aqueducts, Aqua Appia and Aqua Anio Vetus, were greatly damaged and many fraudulent misappropriations of their water reduced the flow.

The Roman Senate commissioned Marcius to repair the channels of two aqueducts and stop the diversion. Additionally, he was given the task to build a bigger aqueduct. He was granted 8,400,000 sestertii for construction, and since his praetorship term expired before the aqueduct's completion, it was extended for a year.

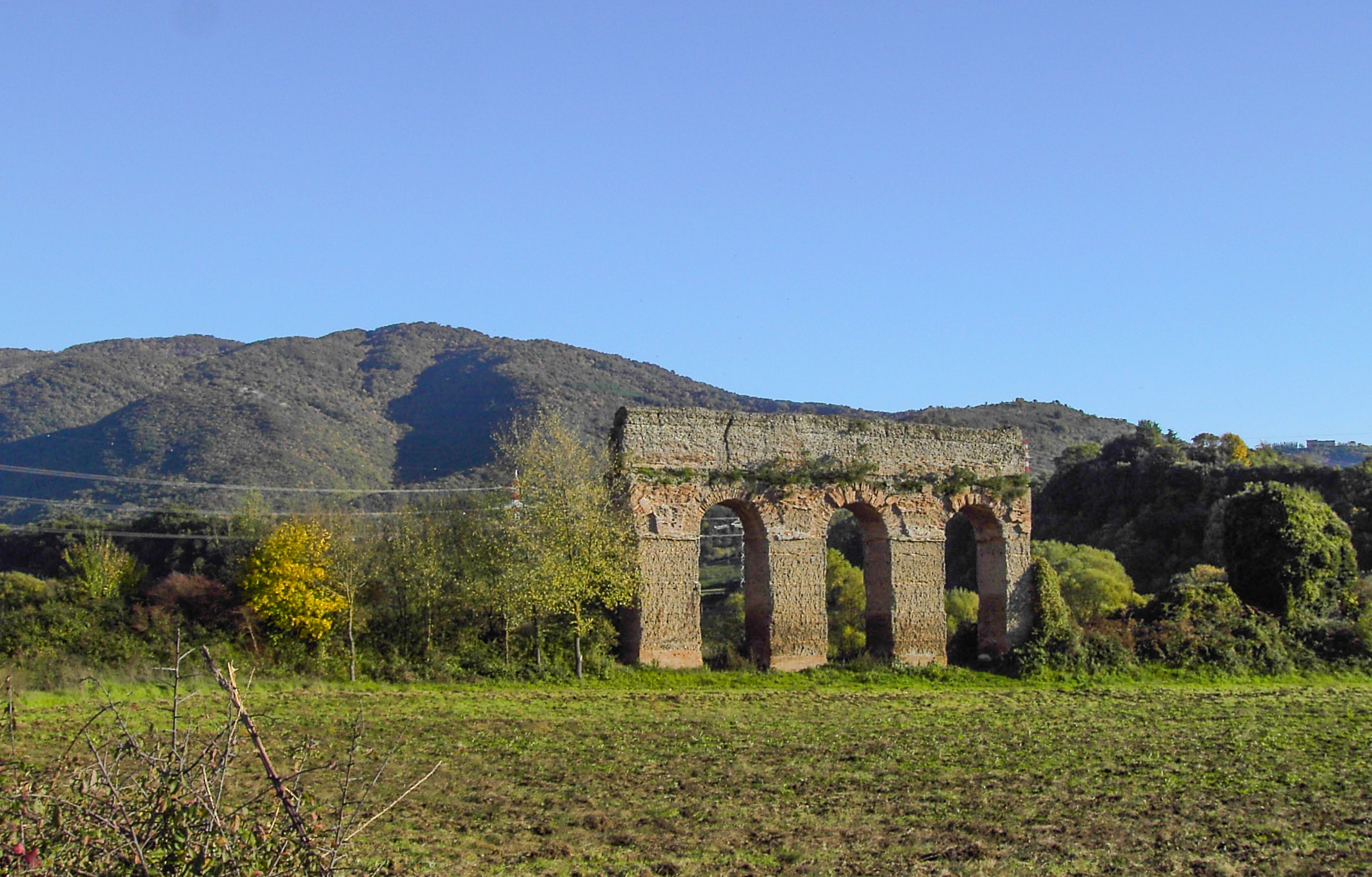
Aqua Marcia

The canals, named Aqua Marcia to honor Marcius, reached to the hill Capitolinus on arches, while secondary branches brought water to the hills Caelius and Aventinus.

In 143 BC, under the consulship of Appius Claudius Pulcher and Quintus Caecilius Metellus Macedonicus, the Decemvirs consulted the Sibylline Books and found that it was forbidden for the Aqua Anio Vetus's water to be led to the Capitolinus. They reported their conclusions to the Senate, who rejected the counsel. Three years later, in 140 BC, under the consulship of Quintus Servilius Caepio and Gaius Laelius Sapiens, this matter was again brought before the Roman Senate. Despite the priests' repeated warnings, Marcius prevailed, and the aqueduct's construction was completed.

Regardless whether the initial change in the aqueduct was the result of ignorance, intention, or chance, the aqueduct was kept in Rome, because it was needed to support the city in its wars against the Italics.

== See also ==
- Marcii Reges

== Sources ==
- Frontinus - De aquaeductu
- Pliny the Elder - Natural History
- Plutarch - Life of Coriolanus
- Smith, William - Dictionary of Greek and Roman Biography and Mythology
