= Via Sublacensis =

Roman road

Coordinates: 41.980933°N 13.03038112°E

The Via Sublacensis was a Roman road constructed to connect Nero's palace (the Villa Sublacensis) in present-day Subiaco to Rome, splitting off from the Via Valeria near Varia (modern Vicovaro), about 10 km northeast of Tivoli.

It was referred to in relation to the source of the Aqua Anio Novus, a major aqueduct which was originally at the 38th milestone of the Via Sublacensis.

The junction of the Via Sublacensis with the Via Valeria was discovered in 1889 at Casaletti, in the valley below Roviano, during the construction of an aqueduct at a distance from Rome of 36 miles, according to the preserved milestones.
