= List of aqueducts in the city of Rome =

This is a list of ancient Roman aqueducts in the city of Rome.

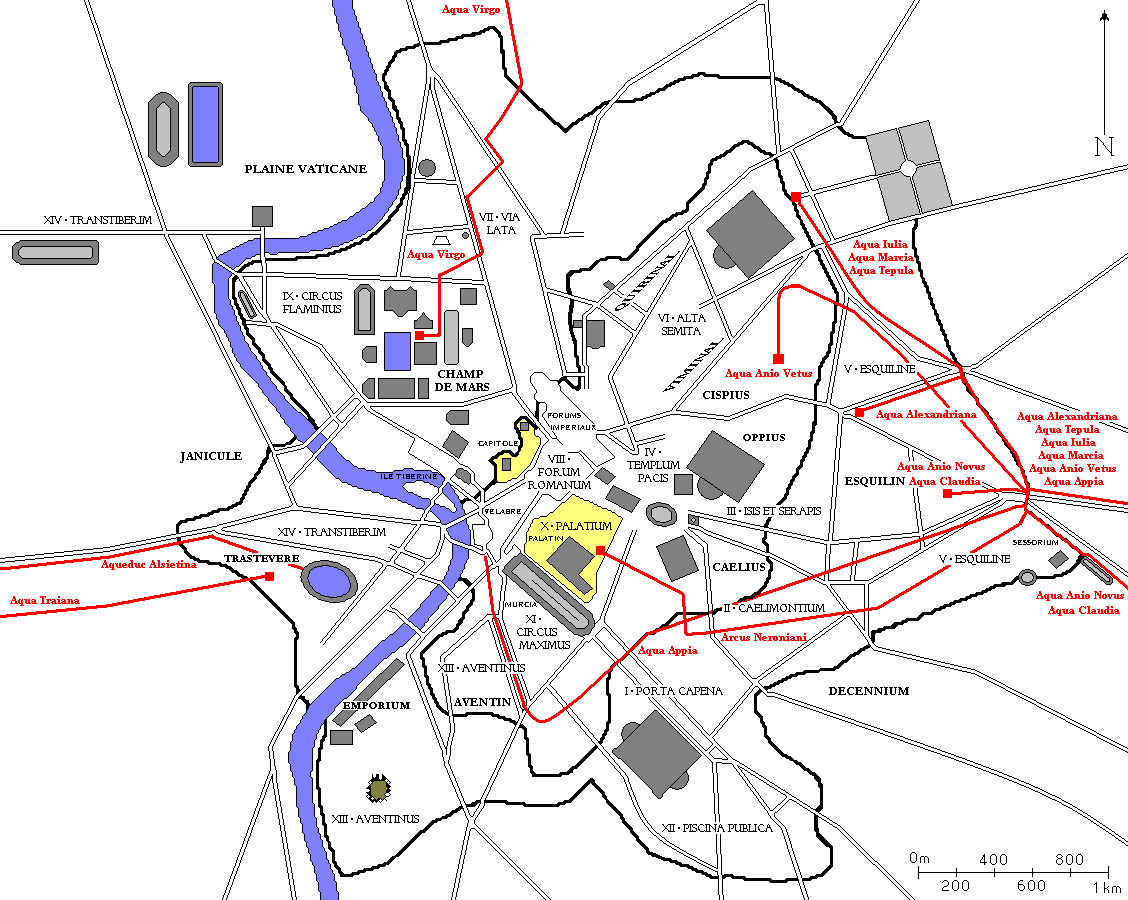
The eleven ancient aqueducts of Rome

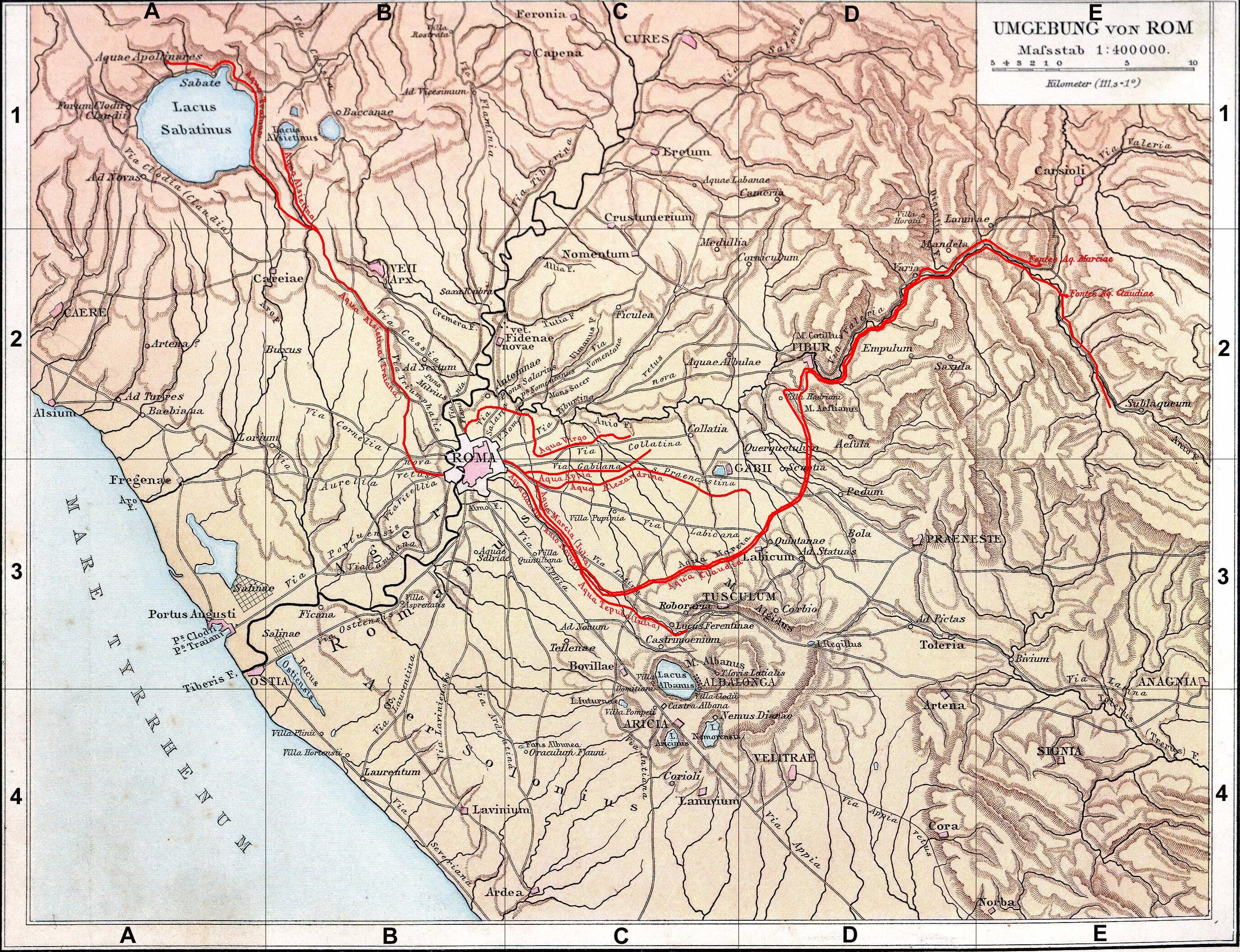
Route of the aqueducts outside of Rome

== Introduction ==
In order to meet the water needs of its population, the city of Rome was eventually supplied with 11 aqueducts by 226 AD, which were some of the city's greatest engineering achievements. Estimates of total water supplied in a day by all aqueducts vary from 520,000 m^{3} (140,000,000 US gal) to 1,127,220 m^{3} (297,780,000 US gal), mostly sourced from the Aniene river and the Apennine Mountains, serving a million citizens. Most of our information about Roman aqueducts come from statistics compiled in the late 1st century AD by Sextus Julius Frontinus, the Curator Aquarum.

These estimates may not have considered water loss. Modern engineers have questioned the validity of these figures and measured Anio Novus limestone deposits to estimate the average wetted perimeter and surface roughness corresponding to only 2/3 of the flow figure given below.

Aqueducts in the (ancient) city Rome
Name	Year begun	Year completed	Length (km)	Height at source (m)	Height in Rome (m)	Average gradient (%)	Capacity (m^{3} a day)	Quality
Aqua Appia		312 BC	16	30	20	0.06	73,000	
Aqua Anio Vetus	272 BC	269 BC	64	280	48	0.36	175,920	
Aqua Marcia	144 BC	140 BC	91	318	59	0.27	187,600	
Aqua Tepula		125 BC	18	151	61	0.5	17,800	
Aqua Julia	40 BC	33 BC	23	350	64	1.24	48,240	
Aqua Virgo		19 BC	21	24	20	0.02	100,160	
Aqua Alsietina		2 BC	33	209	17	0.6	15,680	Considered the worst in quality, and used as drinkable source only when other supplies were unavailable.
Aqua Anio Novus	38 AD	52 AD	87	400	70	0.38	189,520	Considered after Alsietina the worst in quality.
Aqua Claudia	38 AD	52 AD	69	320	67	0.38	184,220	
Aqua Traiana		109 AD	58	-	-	0.38	113,920	
Aqua Alexandrina		226 AD	22	-	50	0.1	21,160	

== See also ==
- Aqueduct (bridge)
- Aqueduct (water supply)
- Parco degli Acquedotti
- List of aqueducts
- List of aqueducts in the Roman Empire
- List of Roman aqueducts by date
