= Opus quadratum =

Roman masonry using parallel courses of squared stone of the same height

Opus quadratum ("squared work") is an ancient Roman construction technique, in which squared blocks of stone of the same height were set in parallel courses, most often without the use of mortar. The Latin author Vitruvius describes the technique.

== Technique ==
Opus quadratum in the Greek way (isodomic)

Opus quadratum in the Etruscan way (irregular)

This technique was used by the Romans from about the 6th century BC, and over time the precision and accuracy of the block cutting improved. The technique continued to be used throughout the age of the Roman Empire, even after the introduction of mortar, and was often used in addition to other techniques. The type of stone, the size of the blocks, and the way the blocks were put together can all be used to help archaeologists date structures that display the technique.

=== Etruscan way ===
In early usage (often called the "Etruscan way"), the joints between the block introduce discontinuities, making the blocks uneven. Examples of such construction can be found in reservoirs, basements, terrace walls, and temple podiums in Etruscan cities and Rome.

=== Greek way ===
Subsequently (the "Greek way"), the blocks would be placed in one of two rotations. "Stretchers" would be placed so the longer side was on the face of the wall, and "headers" would be placed so the shorter side was on the face of the wall, and would thus extend further back into the wall thickness. Various patterns could be produced by changing how the blocks were placed, and it was common to strengthen the wall by ensuring that the joints between blocks were centered over the blocks in the row below.

=== Roman concrete ===
With the introduction of Roman concrete, continuous outer walls were often constructed, with some blocks laid as headers in order to attach to the inner wall. Tile or marble can be found cemented to such walls, but this was less common for those structures that were particularly load-bearing, such as arches and pillars used for bridges and aqueducts.

== See also ==
- Mausoleum of Theodoric (520 CE), late reuse of opus quadratum
- Roman masonry – building techniques in ancient Rome
