= Aqua Appia =

First Roman aqueduct

Coordinates: 41°53′22″N 12°30′40″E

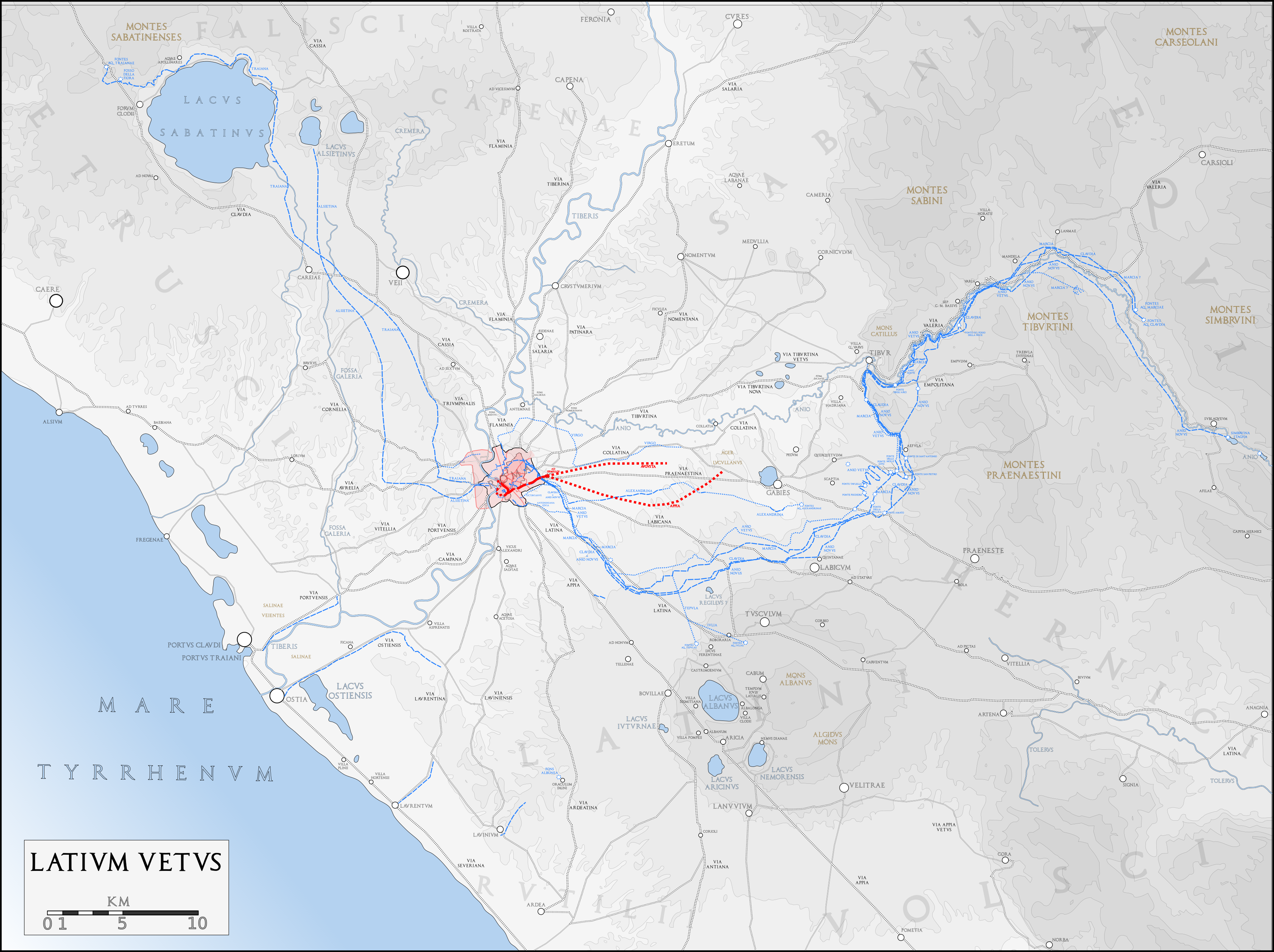
Route of the Aqua Appia

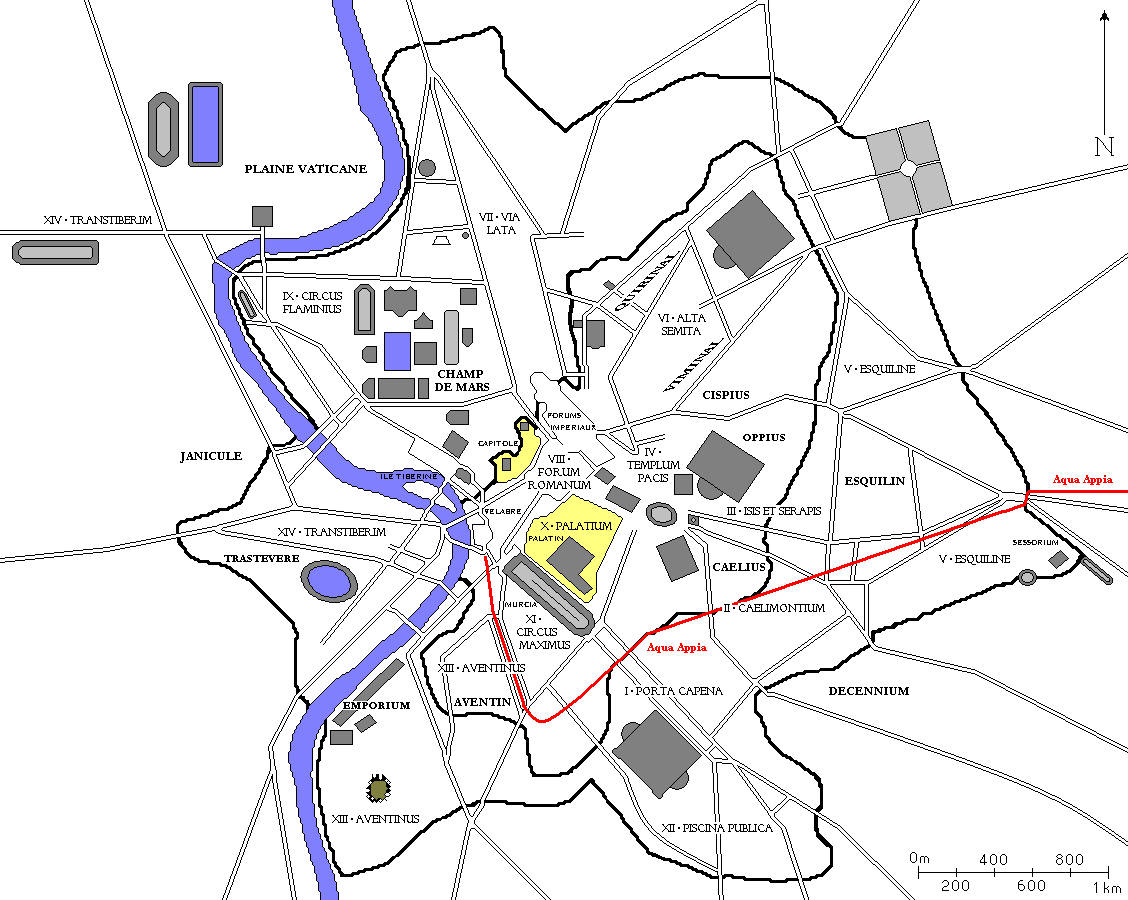
Map of Aqua Appia in Rome

The Aqua Appia was the first Roman aqueduct, and its construction was begun in 312 BC by the censor Appius Claudius Caecus, who also built the important Via Appia. By the end of the 1^{st} century BC it had fallen out of use as an aqueduct, and was used as a sewer instead.

The springs feeding Aqua Appia were discovered by Appius' co-censor Gaius Plautius Venox, who received the cognomen Venox for the discovery. The aqueduct was named after Appius alone because Plautius resigned after serving 18-months as a censor while Appius deceitfully kept his position until the aqueduct was completed.

It's not certain how much water Aqua Appia fed to the city of Rome, but in the city records it is mentioned to have 841 quinariae -- 34,901 m^{3} (9,220,000 US gal) per 24-hours. However, measurements taken in the 1st century AD resulted with pipes being in total of 1,825 quinariae -- 73,000 m^{3} (19,000,000 US gal) per 24 hours. The water was fed to twenty local reservoirs from which it was further distributed to various districts of Rome.

In 2016, what is likely to be a 32 m (105 ft) section of the Aqua Appia was excavated 17–18 m (56–59 ft) beneath Piazza Celimontana. Parts of the excavated section were relocated for reconstruction elsewhere.

== Route ==
The length of the original aqueduct was 11,190 paces -- 16.6 km (10.3 mi), with most, 11,130 paces, underground. A secondary branch added by Augustus in 33 BC was 6,380 paces -- 9.4 km (5.8 mi) long. The original branch probably followed Via Collatina, a highway nearby. The route of the later branch up to Porta Maggiore is not known.

The original branch of Aqua Appia probably had as its source a group of springs in a stretch of marshland collecting water from the slopes of Alban Hills, situated in Lucullus' estate 780 paces (1,150 m (3,770 ft) from Via Praenestina. The secondary branch had its source near Via Praenestina as well, but the exact location of the source has not been identified. From the junction of two branches the aqueduct ran through the Caelian Hill to the slopes of the eastern summit on Aventine Hill before crossing through the greater Aventine on the northwest, ending near Porta Trigemina at the bottom of Clivus Publicus -- a place known as Salinae.

It dropped only 10 metres (33 ft) over its entire length, making it a remarkable engineering achievement for its day.

The aqueduct served the private Baths of Decius and Baths of Licinius Sura on the Aventine. The level of the channel was too low to be able to provide water to the hills.

== Historical context ==
The Aqua Appia was constructed during the Second Samnite War. The main source of information about the aqueduct is Frontinus' De Aqueductu, written during the latter half of the 1^{st} century AD.

In the 4^{th} century BC the Etruscans had built underground drainage channels, cuniculi, carved in soft tufa rock. These constructions were especially common around Veii, Ardea, and Velletri, all near Rome. Though there is no direct evidence, it is probable that the cuniculi influenced Roman aqueduct construction.

== Construction ==
Only the three fairly short stretches of the channel of Aqua Appia have been found this far. A part of conduit found in ca. 1675 in the quarries under the Aventine Hill is cut in the tufa stone of the hill, and lined with rough-cut stone. This part of the aqueduct differs from other Roman aqueducts for its first 103.6 m (340 ft): The corridor is 5.5 ft (1.7 m) in both height and width. Another stretch of the aqueduct was discovered in 1867 slightly further west from the stretch found in ca. 1675; this part of the aqueduct too is cut in tufa stone, being the standard 6 ft (1.8 m) in height and 2 ft (0.61 m) in width. The roof was ridged by the joining of two slabs of cappellaccio to form a gable. This is a similar construction found in the Anio Vetus aqueduct which could be evidence of renovations made in 144 BC.

As with most aqueducts, the conduit was big enough to allow maintenance crews to walk inside to clean out any debris or make any repairs. Also, it is most likely that there were shafts with footholes within the countryside giving access. Regular cleaning up of debris was necessary since, as Frontinus' records indicate, there was no settling tank in the route of the Aqua Appia.

== Renovations and expansion ==
In 144 BC Quintus Marcius Rex restored the older aqueduct of Aqua Appia; however, it's not known how extensive the repairs were. After Marcius' repairs the aqueduct received no attention for over a century, but in 33 BC restoration works attributed to Marcus Vipsanius Agrippa took place Aqua Appia. However, the aqueduct required repairs again in a few years, and renovations were made between 11 and 4 BC, managed this time by Augustus who also added a secondary branch known as Appia Augusta or Ramus Augustae. This secondary branch had its source near the route of the original conduit of Aqua Appia, but despite this, the Ramus Augustae ran on an independent channel of 6,380 paces up to Porta Maggiore where it joined Aqua Appia.

== See also ==
- List of aqueducts in the city of Rome
- Ancient Roman technology
- Parco degli Acquedotti

== Other references ==
- Coarelli, Filippo. Rome and environs: an archaeological guide. Berkeley: University of California Press, 2007.
- Gerda de Kleijn (Q65643481). The aqueducts of Rome The Water Supply of Ancient Rome. Amsterdam: J.C. Gieben, 2001.
- N.p., n.d. Web. 13 June 2014.
- Winslow, E. M.. A libation to the gods; the story of the Roman aqueducts. London: Hodder and Stoughton, 1963.
