= Porta Maggiore =

Gate of the Aurelian walls, a landmark of Rome, Italy

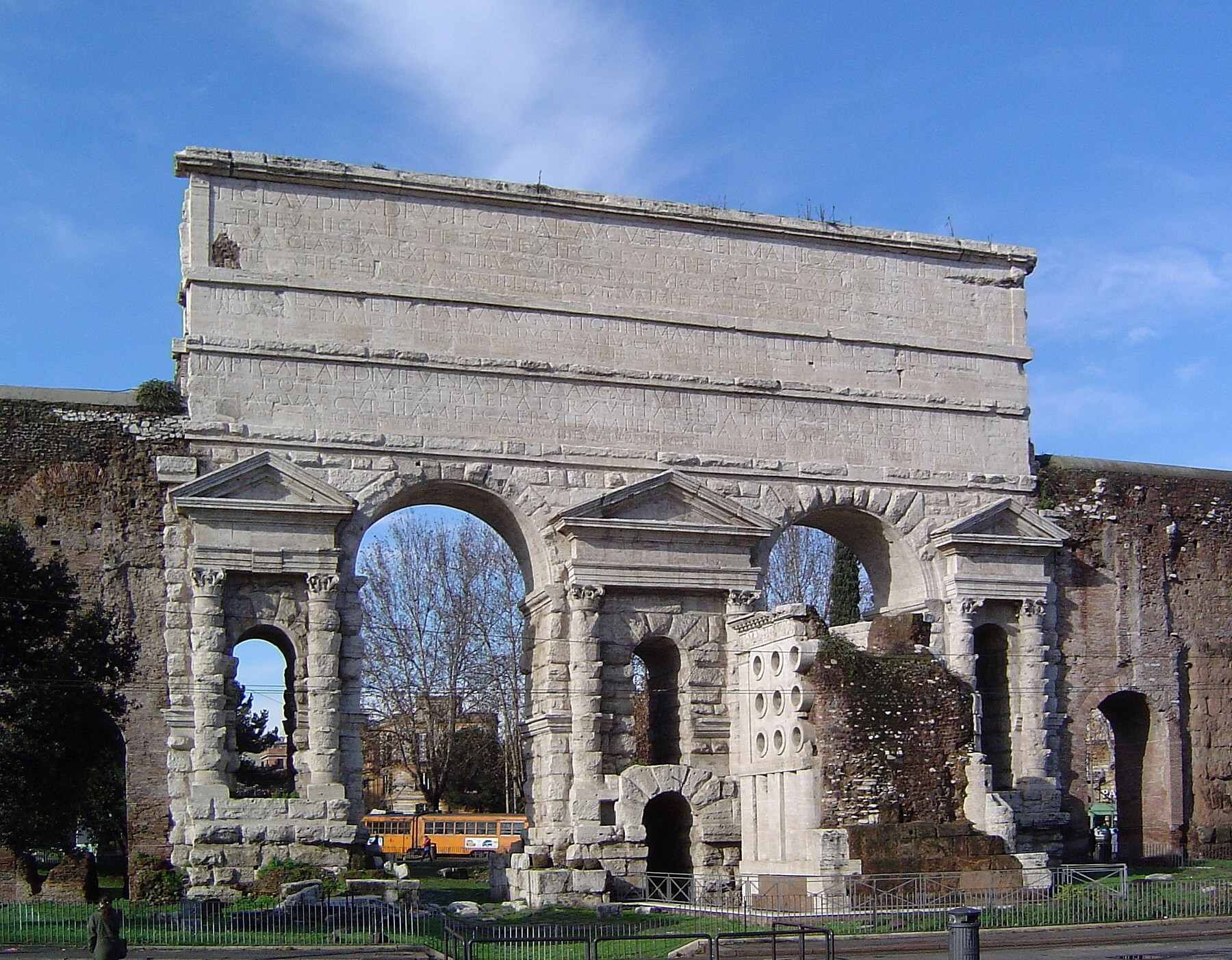
- Porta Maggiore today

- Location within Rome
- Interactive map of Porta Maggiore
- 41°53′29″N 12°30′55″E
- Location: Rome

The Porta Maggiore ("Larger Gate"), or Porta Prenestina, is one of the eastern gates in the ancient but well-preserved 3rd-century Aurelian Walls of Rome. Through the gate ran two ancient roads: the Via Praenestina and the Via Labicana. The Via Prenestina was the eastern road to the ancient town of Praeneste (modern Palestrina). The Via Labicana (now called the Via Casilina) heads southeast from the city.

== History ==
The Porta Maggiore was built by Emperor Claudius in 52 AD, and was later restored by Vespasian and Titus around 20 to 30 years after its construction. In the AD 270s, Porta Maggiore became a gate in the Aurelian Walls. In the 19th century, some of the brick infill was removed to ease a large amount of traffic flowing through the gate.

== The gate ==
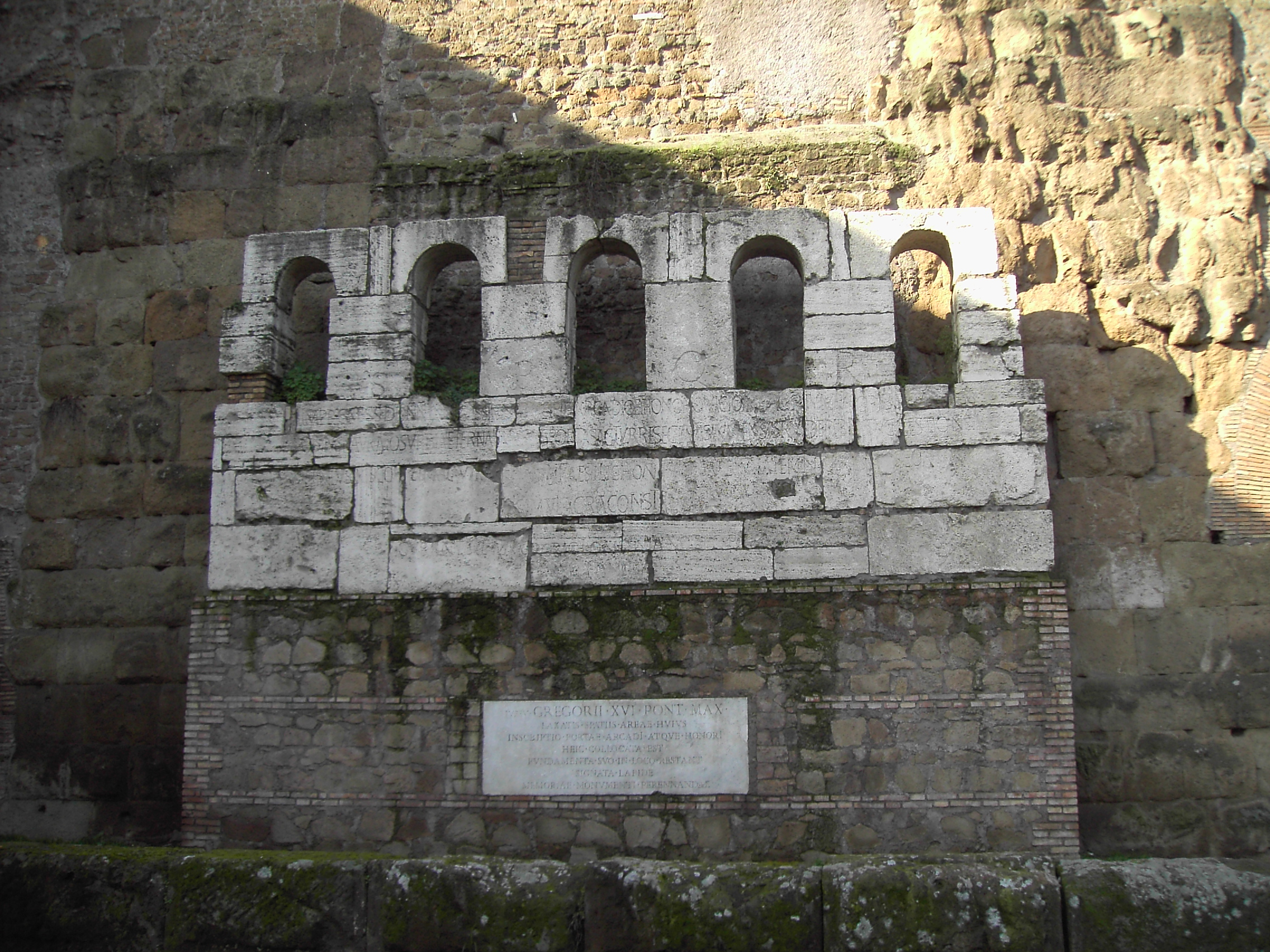
Remains of Honorius' gate, which are not in their original location.

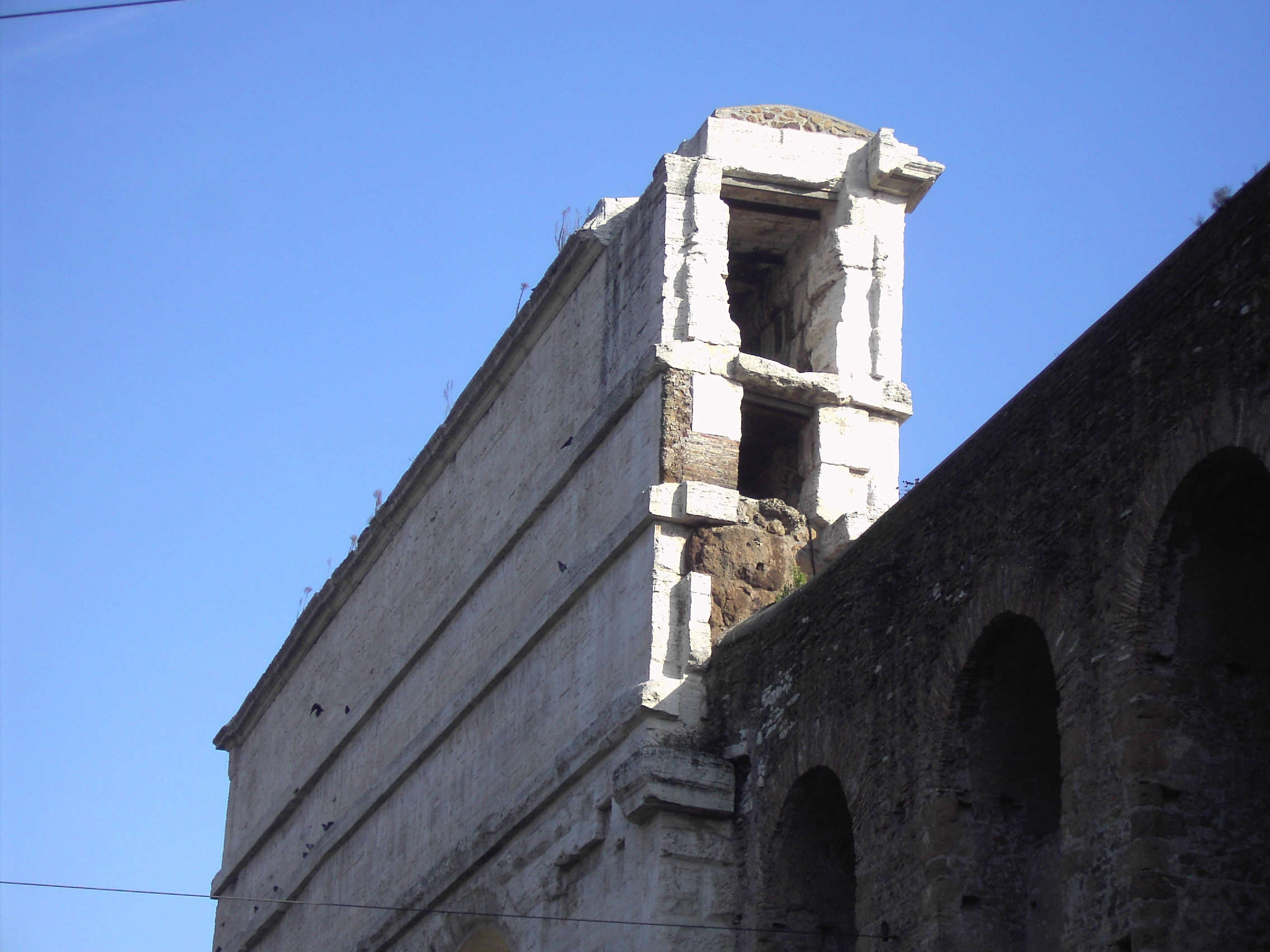
Cross section of Porta Maggiore showing two aqueducts.

The Porta Maggiore is one of the most significant urban sites for an understanding and view of the ancient aqueducts. It is a monumental double archway built of white travertine. It was first known as the Porta Prenestina, perhaps a reference to the road over which it passes (the Via Praenestina). The "gate," built in 52 AD by the emperor Claudius, was originally intended to provide a decorative section of support for two aqueducts, the Aqua Claudia and the Anio Novus. At that time these aqueducts crossed the ancient Via Labicana and Praenestina roads thereby providing the opportunity to create at this location a sort of triumphal arch to the conquest of nature and its conqueror, the emperor Claudius. The two channels of these aqueducts, (the Aqua Claudia and Aqua Anio Novus), one lying on top of the other, can be seen when viewing the cross-section running through the travertine attic at the top of the gate.

The gate was incorporated in the Aurelian Wall in 271 AD by the emperor Aurelian thus truly turning it into an entrance (gate) to the city. Experts refer to this as an early example of "architectural recycling," essentially adapting one existing structure to another use, in this case using an aqueduct as a wall.

It was modified further when the emperor Honorius augmented the walls in 405. The foundations of a guardhouse added by Honorius are still visible, while the upper part of the gate, as built by Honorius, has been moved to the left side of the Porta.

It is currently known as the Porta Maggiore, possibly designated as such because of the road that runs through the gate leads to the Basilica di Santa Maria Maggiore. The church is an important place of prayer dedicated to the Virgin Mary.

The following inscriptions in praise of the emperors Claudius, Vespasian, and Titus for their work on the aqueducts are prominently displayed on the attic of the Porta Maggiore

([In AD 52] the Emperor Claudius [etc.] had the waters of the Claudia brought to Rome from the springs called Caeruleus and Curtius at the 45th milestone, and likewise the Anio Novus from the 62nd milestone, both at his own expense.)

([In AD 71] the Emperor Vespasian [etc.] restored to the city at his own expense the Curtian and Caerulean waters, which had been led to the city by the deified Claudius but had fallen into intermittent use and disrepair for nine years.)

([In AD 81] the Emperor Titus [etc.] at his own expense, had the Curtian and Caerulean waters, introduced by the deified Claudius and afterwards repaired for the city by Titus’s deified father Vespasian, restored with new structures, beginning from its source, after the aqueduct was ruined to its foundations from age.)

== Nearby archaeological remains ==
Close by the gate, just outside the wall, is the unusual Tomb of the Baker, built by Marcus Virgilius Eurysaces.

In 1917, a subterranean Neopythagorean Porta Maggiore Basilica was discovered nearby on the Via Praenestina, dating from the 1st century. The groundplan shows three naves and an apse, a design similar to that which began to be adopted in Christian basilicas during the 4th century. The vaults are decorated with white stuccoes symbolizing Neopythagorean beliefs, although the precise meaning of elements of the decoration remains a subject of debate.

== See also ==
- Porta Metronia – Gate of the Aurelian walls, a landmark of Rome, Italy

== Notes ==
| Preceded by Porta Latina | Landmarks of Rome; Porta Maggiore | Succeeded by Porta Metronia |
