= List of tourist attractions in Rome =

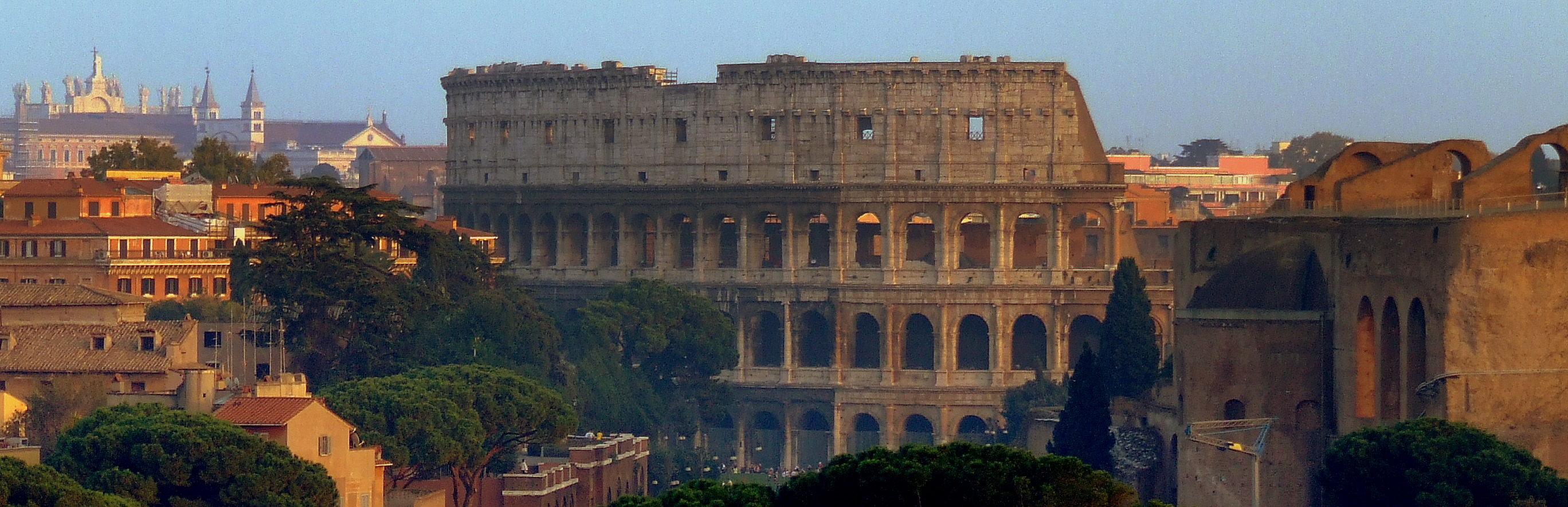
The Colosseum, Rome's second and the world's 5th most popular tourist attraction, with 7.7 million tourists a year.

Rome is regarded as one of the world's most beautiful ancient cities, and contains vast amounts of priceless works of art, palaces, museums, parks, churches, gardens, basilicas, temples, villas, piazzas, theatres, and other venues in general. As one of the world's most important and visited cities, there are numerous popular tourist attractions. In 2005, the city received 19.5 million global visitors, up of 22.1% from 2001. The 5 most visited places in Rome are: #1 Pantheon (8 million tourists a year), #2 The Colosseum (7.036.104 tourists a year), #3 Trevi Fountain (3.5 million tourists a year), #4 Sistine Chapel (3 million tourists a year) and #5 The Roman Forum (2.5 million tourists a year). The study was conducted by the Ministero dei Beni e della Attivita' Culturali e del Turismo (MIBACT) for the year 2017. Rome is the city with the most monuments in the world.

== Religious edifices ==
Building	Types	Period	Description	Picture
St Peter's Basilica	Basilica	16th century	Found in the Vatican City, it is near where the Pope resides, and is one of the most important centres for Christian pilgrimage, and commonly regarded as the "home of the Roman Catholic Church", where St Peter set up the first Christian Church.	
Archbasilica of Saint John Lateran	Basilica, Cathedral	16th century	The official ecclesiastical seat of the bishop of Rome (Pope); it is a major tourist attraction in the city and Rome's cathedral.	
Basilica di Santa Maria Maggiore	Basilica	ancient Rome, 15th–16th century	Another exceedingly important Roman Catholic church in the city, it is also one of the four basilicas of the city, a Marian church, and a papal church.	
Basilica of Saint Paul Outside the Walls	Basilica	Romanesque, medieval	Another of the four great basilicas of Rome, a very important and visited religious building.	
Basilica di San Lorenzo fuori le Mura	Basilica	Paleochristian, romanesque	A smaller basilica, it is an ancient paleo-Christian one, with ancient interiors.	
Sant'Andrea della Valle	Basilica	16th–17th centuries, Baroque, Renaissance	Located in the Sant'Eustachio rione of Rome, it is known for its ornate Baroque/Renaissance facade, and rich interior.	
Santa Maria in Trastevere	Basilica	4th century Paleo-Christian architecture	One of the oldest churches in the city, opened in the mid-4th century AD, it is a minor titular basilica in the Trastevere quarter.	
Santa Maria sopra Minerva	Basilica	Gothic, Renaissance, 19th-century facade and stained-glass windows	A minor titular basilica, the Basilica of Santa Maria sopra Minerva is an example of Roman Gothic architecture. It has a 19th-century facade, and a Gothic interior, with an ancient nave.	
San Pietro in Montorio ("Tempietto")	Roman Catholic Church	16th-17th centuries Renaissance architecture	One of the city's several churches, the San Pietro in Montorio is well known for its "Tempietto", a small circular martyrium designed to look like a classical temple by Donato Bramante, which is found in the church's courtyard.	
Santi Giovanni e Paolo	Basilica	late-4th century Paleo-Christian	Another of the city's ancient churches, it was founded in 498 AD. It is well known for its lavish interior, notably its chandeliers (the ones at present are believed to date back to the 18th century).	
Santa Cecilia in Trastevere	Roman Catholic Church	5th century, Paleo-Christian, Baroque 18th century facade	Another ancient church in the city, it is dedicated to Saint Cecilia. It has a Baroque facade constructed by Ferdinando Fuga in 1725.	
All Saints'	Anglican Church	late-19th century neo-gothic architecture	Founded in the 1880s as a church to serve Rome's Church of England community, it has an English neo-Gothic appearance, yet it is sculpted in Italian marble.	
Great Synagogue of Rome	Synagogue	early 20th century, eclectic architecture with slight neo-classical and Jewish influences	The biggest and main synagogue of Rome, it has provided a place of worship to the city's Jewish community since 1901-–1904, when the current eclectic edifice was constructed.	
Mosque of Rome	Mosque	1990s, built in traditional middle-eastern Islamic style	Finished in 1995, the Mosque of Rome is the largest in Europe.	

== Secular edifices, parks, public spaces and monuments ==
Building	Types	Period	Description	Picture
Vatican Museums	Art museum	16th century	The Vatican Museums are the public museums of Vatican City, it is the second most visited museum in the world with over 6.5 million visitors a year. The collection on display consists of some of the most famous Roman sculptures and the most important masterpieces of Renaissance art in the world. The collection is divided into ancient (Roman, Etruscan and Egyptian), medieval, Renaissance, Baroque and Rococo, modern and contemporary works of art.	
Sistine Chapel	Chapel, art gallery	16th century	Also found in the Vatican City, it contains a huge collection of paintings from all periods, and is Rome's leading and most visited chapel. In 2007, the chapel received 3 million visitors, making it Rome's most popular chapel.	
Trevi Fountain	Fountain	18th century, Roman Baroque	One of the most recognizable and iconic monuments in the city, the Trevi Fountain was designed and completed in the 18th century. Tourists come to the fountain in order to throw a coin, which is, according to a local legend, supposed to bring good luck. It was also famous for having featured in a major scene of Federico Fellini's 1960 La Dolce Vita. As of February 2026, access to the fountain’s immediate area requires a €2 ticket.	
Spanish Steps and Piazza di Spagna	Flight of stairs and public square	18th century, Baroque	One of the city's top attractions, the flight of 138 stairs is the biggest in Europe. They are topped by the Trinita dei Monti church, and below there is the large Piazza di Spagna. The Piazza di Spagna is also a major shopping destination in the city, and hosts several designer boutiques such as Missoni.	
Via dei Condotti	Street	Mixture, notably 16th-, 17th- and 18th-century architecture	Rome's leading shopping street, it contains a wide category of high-fashion or haute-couture boutiques and salons, such as Valentino, Bulgari, Gucci, Dolce & Gabbana, Louis Vuitton, Chanel, Giorgio Armani, Prada and Dior, the headquarters, ateliers or major offices of major flagship labels such as, and also several of the city's finest restaurants, cafes, antique shops and bars.	
Via del Corso	Street	Complete mixture	One of Rome's busiest, biggest and most important streets, the Via del Corso used to be called the Via Lata. It is one of the very few streets in the city to be completely straight, and contains several monuments, palaces, hotels, restaurants, shops and other forms of commerce in general.	
Piazza del Popolo	Square	19th century neoclassicism	A fine example of early Roman neoclassical architecture, the name means "Square of the people", yet its real name derives from the poplar trees which used to line the square. It contains several statues, an obelisk and the Santa Maria del Popolo church.	
Galleria Alberto Sordi	Shopping gallery	early-20th century Art Nouveau	Constructed in Art Nouveau, or Liberty style in 1914, the Galleria Alberto Sordi is an arcaded shopping gallery, and it contains several shops, cafes, bookstores and boutiques.	
Via del Babuino and il Babuino speaking fountain	Street, talking fountain	Mixture, notably pre-19th century	Another of Rome's top shopping streets, it too contains some major fashion boutiques, including Gente, Etro, Emporio Armani and Prada Casual, but also several young designer-wear and knitwear stores, antique shops and jewelers. The street also contains il babuino, one of Rome's speaking fountains (a fountain where several people discuss and voice their political and social ideas). Once, the fountain was covered with political graffiti and different notices, messages and placards, yet, all of this has been removed and anti-graffiti paint has been sprayed around the fountain, since several complained that all the messages and slogans were ruining the appearance of the street. Via del Babuino also contains the Church of England All Saints Church, for Rome's Anglican community.	
Via Veneto	Street	Mixture, notably 18th- and 19th-century architecture, and significant Art Nouveau buildings	One of the city's most expensive, famous and luxurious streets, it was epitomised in the 1950s and 60s in Federico Fellini's 1960 La Dolce Vita. Today, it contains several exclusive apartments, grand hotels and elegant shops.	
Piazza Colonna	Public square	16th-century Renaissance, including some Baroque 18th- and 19th-century buildings	Originally an ancient Roman square, it currently is flocked by fine Renaissance palazzi and is centred by the ancient Roman Column of Marcus Aurelius. It contains several important governmental and political structures, such as the Palazzo Chigi, the seat of the government of Italy and originally the official embassy of Austria-Hungary.	
Piazza Navona	Square	Relative mixture, predominantly 15th, 16th and 17th century Renaissance and Baroque architecture	One of the city's best known squares, or piazzas, it is known for its impressive Renaissance and Baroque architecture, several fine buildings, monuments and churches, and numerous open-air bars, pizzerias, restaurants, cafes, stalls and artists.	
Palazzo di Giustizia ("Palazzaccio")	Palace, legal and governmental building	late-19th century, early 20th century neo-Renaissance architecture	Started in 1889 and completed in 1910, the Palazzo di Giustizia (literally, "Palace of Justice") currently hosts Italy's main law courts. These courts are situated in a grand turn-of-the-century neo-Renaissance palace.	
Piazza della Repubblica and the Fontana delle Naidi	Square, fountain	Eclectic, mainly 18th – early-20th century neoclassical architecture	With a semi-circular formation, this piazza is one of the city's finest neoclassical public squares. Today, the buildings surrounding the square host offices, companies, restaurants, banks and insurance and travel agencies. The middle of the square contains the Fontana delle Naidi, made in 1911 and showing fierce sea-nymphs.	
Antico Caffè Greco	Cafe	18th century decor	A historic and ancient cafe, it was founded in 1760 in the Via dei Condotti, it has 18th and 19th century interior decor. It has hosted several intellectuals and important foreigners, such as Lord Byron, Goethe, Liszt and Keats.	
Galleria Borghese and the Villa Borghese gardens	Villa, art gallery, park and garden	16th-17th centuries	The main villa of the city, once owned by the noble Borghese family and later the Bonapartes (Pauline Bonaparte), it currently is one of Rome's top artistic galleries, and also contains a major park, with several lakes, features, and follies.	
Capitoline Museums and the Piazza del Campidoglio	Museums and public square	15th–16th century Renaissance architecture	Found in the Piazza del Campidoglio on the Capitol Hill, the square and the museums were designed by Michelangelo in 1471. Today, they mainly host ancient Roman and Greek sculptures and works of art. The Piazza del Campidoglio is renowned for its symmetrical Renaissance architecture, and also hosts the Rome city hall.	
Monument of Vittorio Emanuele II	Public monument	early-20th century, neo-classical style	Built in the early 20th century, the Monument, also called the "Altare della Patria" (Altar of the homeland), is one of Rome's most notable monuments. Built in a neo-classical style, with a grandiose flight of stairs and colonnade, it is a controversial monument – its grandeur and pomp has made it often receive the names of "giant type-writer", "wedding-cake" and "zuppa inglese" (an Italian dessert).	
Campo dei Fiori	Market-square, open space	Eclectic, notably late-13th-, 14th-, 15th- and 16th-century buildings	Literally meaning "flower field", due to its status once as a meadow, this public square has for centuries – and still does – serve as an important market-place, and the piazza is flocked with several Medieval and Renaissance palaces and churches.	
Esposizione Universale Roma (EUR)	Business, public and residential district	Notably mid-20th century Fascist, late-neoclassical and modernist architecture	Intended to be the district to host Rome's Universal Exposition, which in the end, never occurred, it was built by Benito Mussolini in the 1930s and '40s, and used to be called the E42. It is often considered one of the best examples of planned Fascist architecture, and is often considered one of the most serene and livable quarters of the city, yet its austere architecture has often arisen to much controversy.	
Palazzo del Quirinale	Palace, political building and residence	16th-18th centuries	The official residence of the President of the Italian Republic, the Quirinal Palace is built in a Renaissance/Baroque architectural style, and boasts elegant Renaissance gardens and a lavish interior.	
Villa Giulia and the National Etruscan Museum	Villa and museum	16th century Renaissance	Found by Pope Julius II in the 1550s, the Villa Giulia is a Renaissance villa, which inside hosts the National Etruscan Museum, filled with several Etruscan and Classical treasures.	
Galleria Doria Pamphilj	Museum, art gallery	Roman Baroque	One of Rome's biggest and most significant private artistic collections, it is currently, and has been owned, by the family of the same name for centuries.	
Castel Sant'Angelo	Ex-mausoleum, later castle and current museum	ancient Roman, medieval, Renaissance	Once the "Mausoleum of Hadrian", it later became a papal residence and currently hosts a major museum.	
Galleria Nazionale d'Arte Antica and the Accademia dell'Arcadia	Academy, palace, museum and art gallery	18th century late-Baroque/Rococo	Consisting of two separate buildings: Palazzo Barberini (formerly owned by the Barberini family) and Palazzo Corsini (rebuilt by the Corsini family in the 1730s and 1740s). It is the main national collection of ancient paintings in Rome.	

== Classical and ancient Roman sites ==
Building	Types	Period	Description	Picture
Colosseum	Amphitheatre	ancient Roman	Arguably one of Rome's most famous and iconic monuments, it is the Roman world's biggest amphitheatre and is one of the city's most visited attractions. It is regarded as being a wonder of the medieval world.	
Baths of Diocletian	Bath	ancient Roman	Largest public bath complex in Rome, its ruins were converted into a church and are now part of the National Roman Museum	
Roman Forum	Roman Forum	ancient Roman	The Forum of ancient Rome, and the centre of the city's politics and business at the time.	
Pantheon	Temple	ancient Roman	It is a classical building in the city, originally built by Marcus Agrippa as a temple to all the gods of Ancient Rome, and rebuilt in the early 2nd century AD. A near-contemporary writer, Cassius Dio, speculates that the name comes from the statues of many gods placed around the building, or from the resemblance of the dome to the heavens.	
Baths of Caracalla	Bath	ancient Roman	From the full name of the emperor Caracalla, (belonging to the Severan dynasty), they constitute one of the most grandiose examples of imperial thermae in Rome. They were built by the emperor on the Little Aventine between 212 and 216 AD (as demonstrated by the brick stamps).	
Ostia Antica	Ancient Roman colony	ancient Roman	It is an ancient Roman city and port of Rome located at the mouth of the Tiber, one of the first official colonia of ancient Rome. With an area of 150 hectares it is the largest archaeological park in the world. The archaeological site provides details on Roman urban planning that are not accessible within the city of Rome itself.	
Appian Way Regional Park	Roman archaeological site	ancient Roman	The Appia Antica Park is the largest urban park in Europe. The territory is a "green wedge" between the center of Rome and the Alban Hills, which represents the most important remnant of the Roman countryside from a historical, archaeological and landscape point of view. In fact, it includes the Appian Way road and its surroundings for a stretch of 16 kilometers (including the Villa dei Quintili), the Park of the Caffarella, the archaeological areas of the Aqueducts (Parco degli Acquedotti), of Tor Fiscale and of the tombs of Via Latina, the Tenuta di Tor Marancia and that of the Farnesiana.	

== See also ==
- List of fountains in Rome
- List of tourist attractions worldwide

== Sources ==
- Cutrufo, Mauro (2010). La Quarta Capitale. Rome. ISBN 978-88-492-1950-0. ( Page 48)
