= List of parks and gardens in Rome =

This article gives an incomplete list of parks and gardens in Rome. Public parks and nature reserves cover a large area in Rome, and the city has one of the largest areas of green space amongst European capitals. The most notable part of this green space is represented by the large number of villas and landscaped gardens created by the Italian aristocracy. While many villas were destroyed during the building boom of the late 19th century, a great many remain. The most notable of these are Villa Borghese, Villa Ada, and Villa Doria Pamphili.

== Gardens ==
=== Ancient (Roman) ===
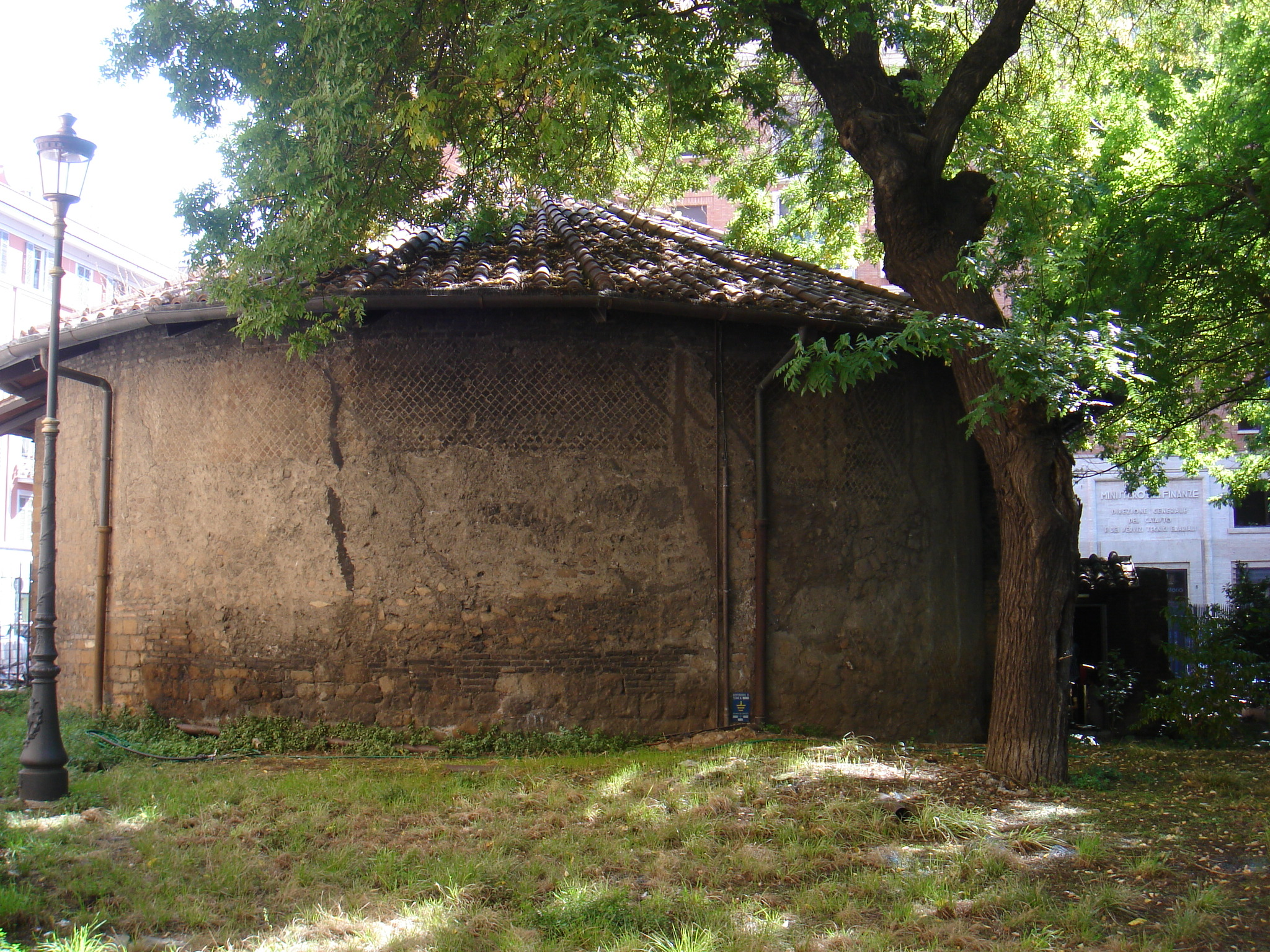
The Auditorium of Maecenas, Esquiline.

- Horti Lamiani

The Lamian Gardens (Latin - Horti Lamiani) were a set of gardens located on the top of the Esquiline Hill in Rome, in the area around the present Piazza Vittorio Emanuele. They were based on the gardens of the consul Aelius Lamia, a friend of Tiberius, and soon (by the time of Caligula) became subsumed into the imperial property.

- Horti Liciniani

The Horti Liciniani were a set of gardens in ancient Rome, which originally belonged to the gens Licinia. In the third century A.D. they were the property of the Emperor Gallienus, himself a member of that gens. The gardens were probably on the Esquiline Hill, at the top of which Gallienus erected a colossal statue of himself. The 4th-century domed nymphaeum that survives, long miscalled a "Temple of Minerva Medica", seems to have been part of the gardens.

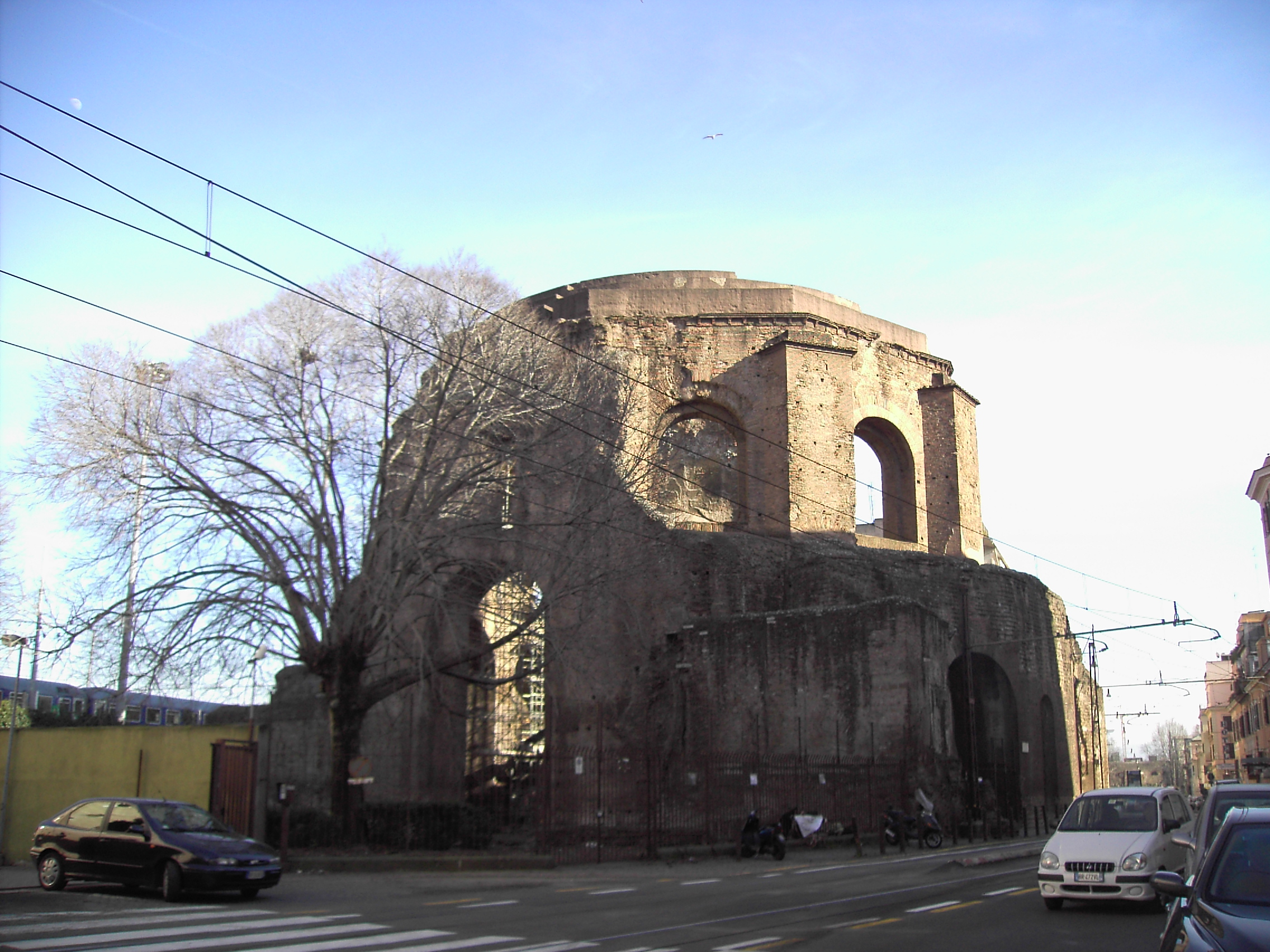
The nymphaeum once mistakenly identified as the Temple of Minerva Medica

- Gardens of Lucullus

The Gardens of Lucullus (Horti Lucullani) were an ancient patrician villa on the Pincian Hill on the edge of Rome; they were laid out by Lucius Licinius Lucullus about 60 BCE. The Villa Borghese gardens still cover 17 acres (69,000 m^{2}) of green on the site, now in the heart of Rome, above the Spanish Steps.

- Gardens of Maecenas

Gardens of Maecenas, gardens built by the Augustan era patron of the arts Maecenas. He sited them on the Esquiline Hill, atop the Servian agger and its adjoining necropolis, near the gardens of Lamia.

- Gardens of Sallust

The Gardens of Sallust (Latin: Horti Sallustiani) were Roman gardens developed by the Roman historian Sallust in the 1st century BC using his wealth extorted as governor of the province of Africa Nova (newly conquered Numidia). The landscaped pleasure gardens occupied a large area in the northwestern sector of Rome, in what would become Region VI, between the Pincian and Quirinal hills, near the Via Salaria and later Porta Salaria. This rione is now known as Sallustiano.

The gardens, which were enriched with many additional structures in the four centuries during which they evolved, contained many pavilions, a temple to Venus, a porticus of a thousand paces, and monumental sculptures. Items later found in the gardens include:

- the Obelisco Sallustiano, a Roman copy of an Egyptian obelisk which now stands in front of the Trinità dei Monti church in the Piazza di Spagna at the top of the Spanish Steps
- the Borghese Vase, discovered there in the 16th century.
- the sculptures known as the Dying Gaul and the Gaul Killing Himself and His Wife
- the Ludovisi Throne, found in 1887, and the Boston Throne, found in 1894.
- the Crouching Amazon, found in 1888 near the via Boncompagni, about twenty-five meters from the via Quintino Sella (Museo Conservatori).

The gardens were acquired by Tiberius and maintained for several centuries by the Roman Emperors as a public amenity. The Emperor Nerva died of a fever in a villa in the gardens in AD 98, and they remained an imperial resort until they were sacked in 410 by the Goths under Alaric, who entered the city at the gates of the horti Sallustiani. The gardens were not finally deserted until the sixth century. In the early 17th century Cardinal Ludovico Ludovisi, nephew of Pope Gregory XV, purchased the site and constructed the Villa Ludovisi, in the course of which several important Roman sculptures were rediscovered. Much of the area occupied by the gardens was divided into building lots and filled following the break-up of Villa Ludovisi after 1894, as Rome expanded as the capital city of Italy after the unification of Italy. The ancient topography itself has been irrevocably altered with the filling of the valley between the Pincio and Quirinal hills where these horti existed.

- Horti Tauriani

The Horti Tauriani (Latin - Taurian gardens) were a large set of gardens in ancient Rome around the residence of Statilius Taurus, eminent character of the 1st century. They were perhaps the cause of his conviction for magic, which allowed Agrippina to confiscate them and add them to the imperial estates. They were then divided into different properties, were partly reunited under Gallienus in the mid 3rd century, but began to split again, in late antiquity being centred round the residence of Vettio Agorio Protested as the Horti Vettiani. From this area come numerous attributable sculptures from the Gardens's different phases : statues of deities, decorative reliefs, two large marble craters and three splendid portraits of Hadrian, Vibia Sabina and Salonia Matidia.

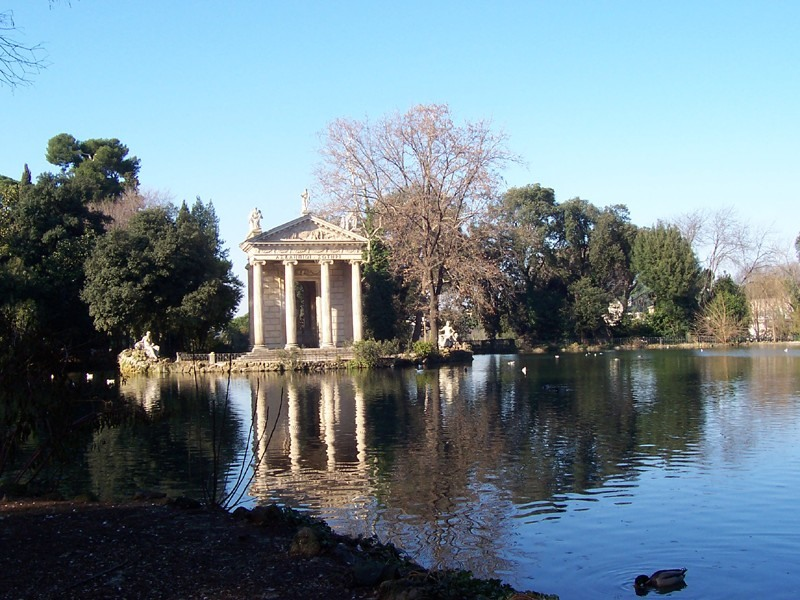
The "Temple of Aesculapius" in the Villa Borghese gardens.

- Temple of Minerva Medica (nymphaeum)

The nymphaeum called the Temple of Minerva Medica ("Minerva the Doctor") is a 4th-century ruin between the via Labicana and Aurelian Walls and just inside the line of the Anio Vetus. Once part of the Horti Liciniani on the Esquiline Hill, now it faces the modern via Giolitti. It is dodecagonal nymphaeum of opus latericium, whose full dome only collapsed in 1828. Both the interior and exterior walls were once covered with marble. Since the 17th century the nymphaeum has frequently been wrongly identified with the Temple of Minerva Medica mentioned in literary sources, on account of the erroneous impression that the Athena Giustiniani had been found in its ruins.

=== Other ===
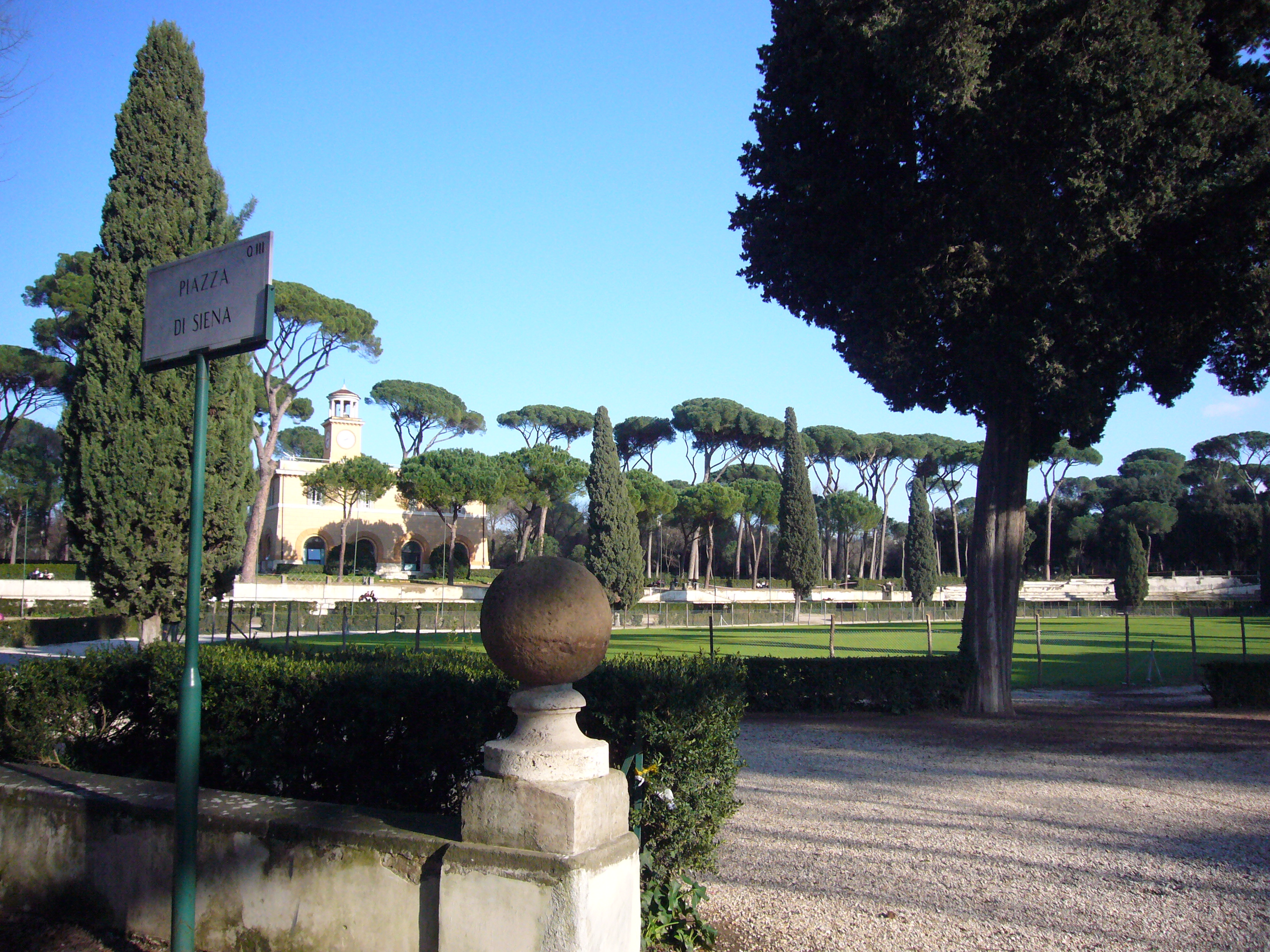
The Piazza di Siena in the Villa Borghese gardens.

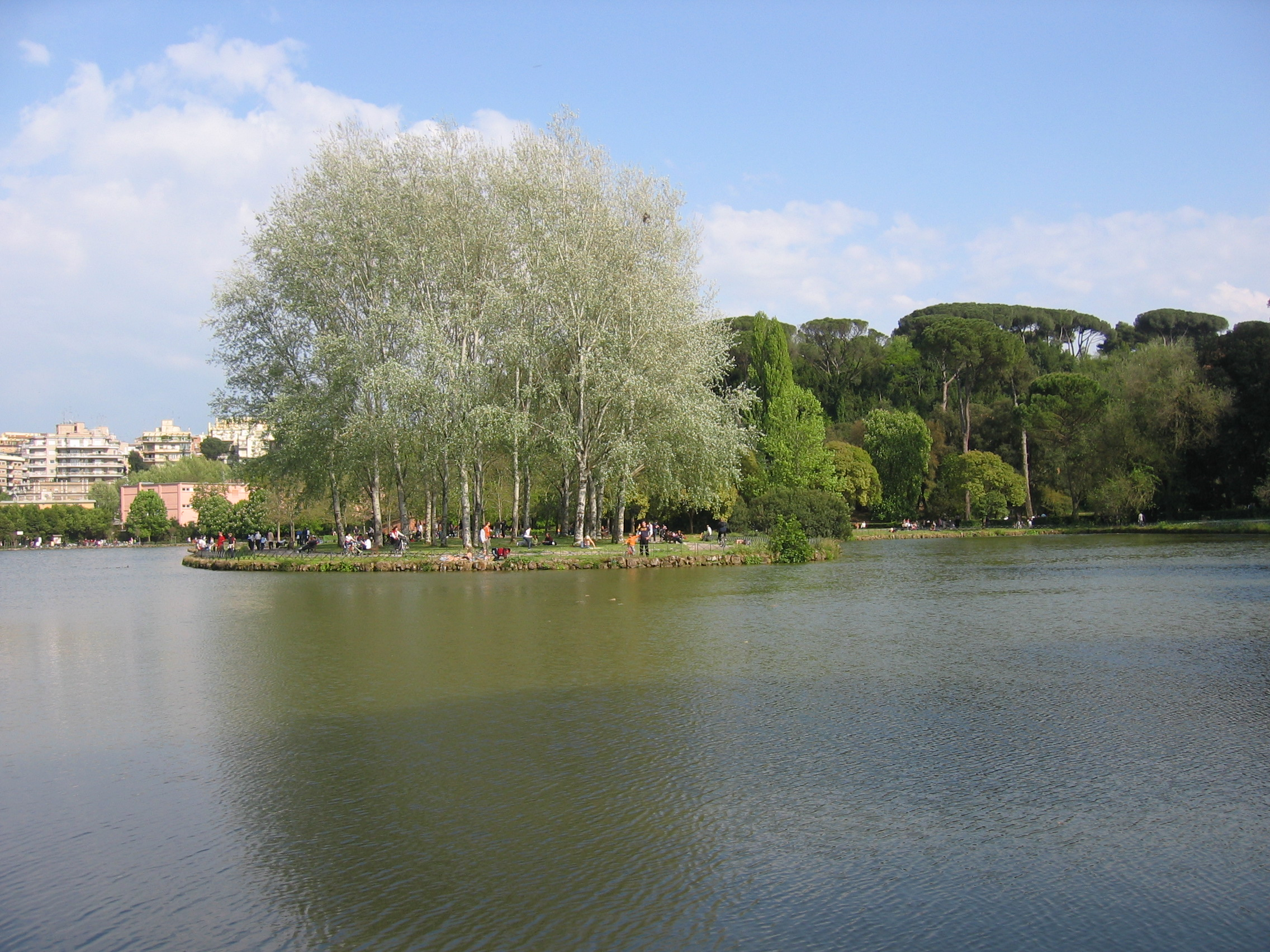
An isle in Villa Ada's lake.

- Villa Ada

Villa Ada is the largest park in Rome, Italy (450 acres/182 hectares). It is located in the northeastern part of the city. Its highest prominence is Monte Antenne, 67 m (220 ft), an ancient archeological site.

- Villa Borghese gardens

Villa Borghese gardens are a large landscape garden designed in the naturalistic English manner in Rome, containing a number of buildings, museums (see Galleria Borghese) and attractions. It is the second largest public park in Rome (80 hectares or 148 acres) after that of the Villa Doria Pamphili. The gardens were developed for the Villa Borghese Pinciana ("Borghese villa on the Pincian Hill"), built by the architect Flaminio Ponzio, developing sketches by Scipione Borghese, who used it as a villa suburbana, a party villa, at the edge of Rome, and to house his art collection. The gardens as they are now were remade in the early nineteenth century.

- Villa Doria Pamphili

The Villa Doria Pamphili is a seventeenth century villa with what is today the largest landscaped public park in Rome and enjoyed as a place of leisure by the inhabitants of Rome. It is located on the Gianicolo or the Roman Janiculum, just outside the Porta San Pancrazio in the ancient walls of Rome where the ancient road of the Via Aurelia commences. It began as a villa for the Pamphili family and when the line died out in the eighteenth century, it passed to Prince Giovanni Andrea IV Doria from which time it has been known as the Villa Doria Pamphili

- Villa Torlonia, Rome

Villa Torlonia is a villa in Rome, Italy, belonging to the Torlonia family. It is entered from via Nomentana. It was designed by the neo-Classic architect Giuseppe Valadier. Construction began in 1806 for the banker Giovanni Torlonia and finished by his son Alessandro. Disused for a time, Mussolini rented it from the Torlonia for one lira a year to use as his state residence from the 1920s onwards. It was abandoned after 1945, and allowed to decay in the following decades, but recent restoration work has allowed it to be opened to the public. Part of the Torlonia family collection of classical sculpture is now housed at the villa.

== Parks ==
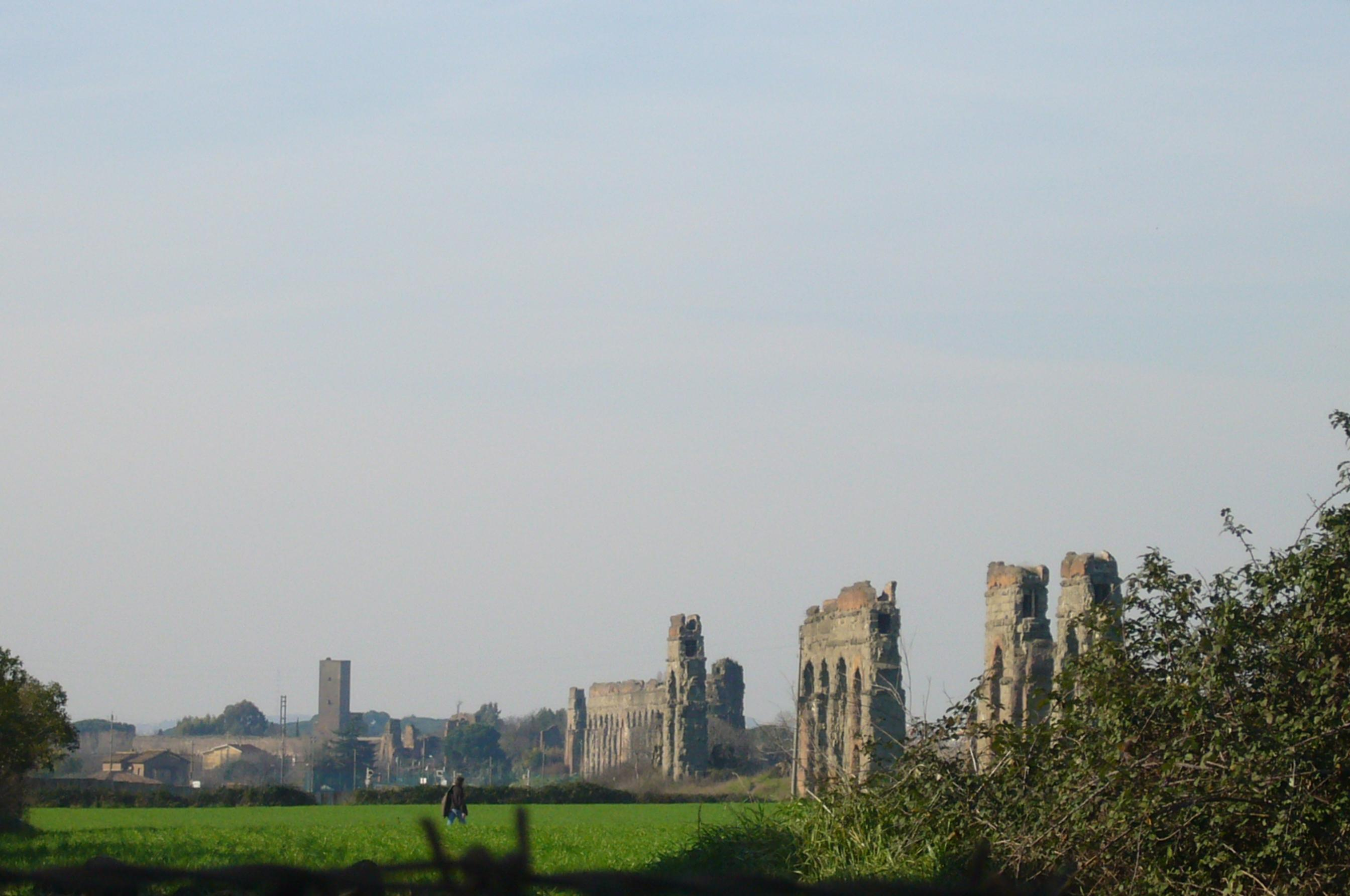
The Parco degli Acquedotti.

- Parco degli Acquedotti

The Parco degli Acquedotti is a public park in Rome, Italy. It is part of the Appian Way Regional Park and is of approximately 240 ha. The park is named after the aqueducts, crossed on one side by the Aqua Felix and containing part of the Aqua Claudia and the remains of Villa delle Vignacce to the southeast. The park is served by the subway stations Lucio Sestio and Giulio Agricola (line A).

- Tor Fiscale Park

The Tor Fiscale park in Rome is located between the 3rd and 4th miles of the Roman Via Latina. It takes its name from a 13th century watchtower that at one time belonged to the Papal Treasurer. The area of the park was crossed by six Roman aqueducts and one from the Middle Ages.

- Park of the Caffarella

The Park of the Caffarella is a large park in Rome, Italy, protected from development. The Caffarella Valley (now the park) is bordered on its northern side by the Via Latina and on its southern by the Appian Way, and extending lengthways from Aurelian's Wall up to via dell'Almone. It is protected for its archaeological (for instance the Nymphaeum of Egeria) and ecological value. Some of the park is farmland.

- Pineto Regional Park

The Pineto Regional Park is a protected natural area of Lazio, Italy, instituted in 1987. It has an area of approximately 240 hectares, which includes Pineta Sacchetti. The park is in the northwest area of the city of Rome, in Municipio XIX, shared between the districts of Aurelio, Primavalle, and Trionfale.

- Regional Park of Decima-Malafede
- Villa Sciarra is a small (6 hectares) quiet park within the walls of Janiculum hill. It is, unusual in Rome, informal and has a children's playground. It is noted for cypresses, pine trees, and rare exotic plants.
- Villa Celimontana is a small quiet park on the Celian Hill. It is noted for its lack of tourists, view of the Baths of Caracalla and a small Egyptian obelisk.
- The Orange Garden (Giardino degli Aranci) is a small park on the Aventine Hill with excellent views of the city.
- The Oppian Hill Park, next to the Colosseum, is built on top of the Domus Aurea or Golden House of Nero and contains ruins of the Baths of Titus and Baths of Trajan.
