= Tor Fiscale Park, Rome =

Archaeological part to the southeast of Rome, Italy

Coordinates: 41.8585°N 12.5451°E

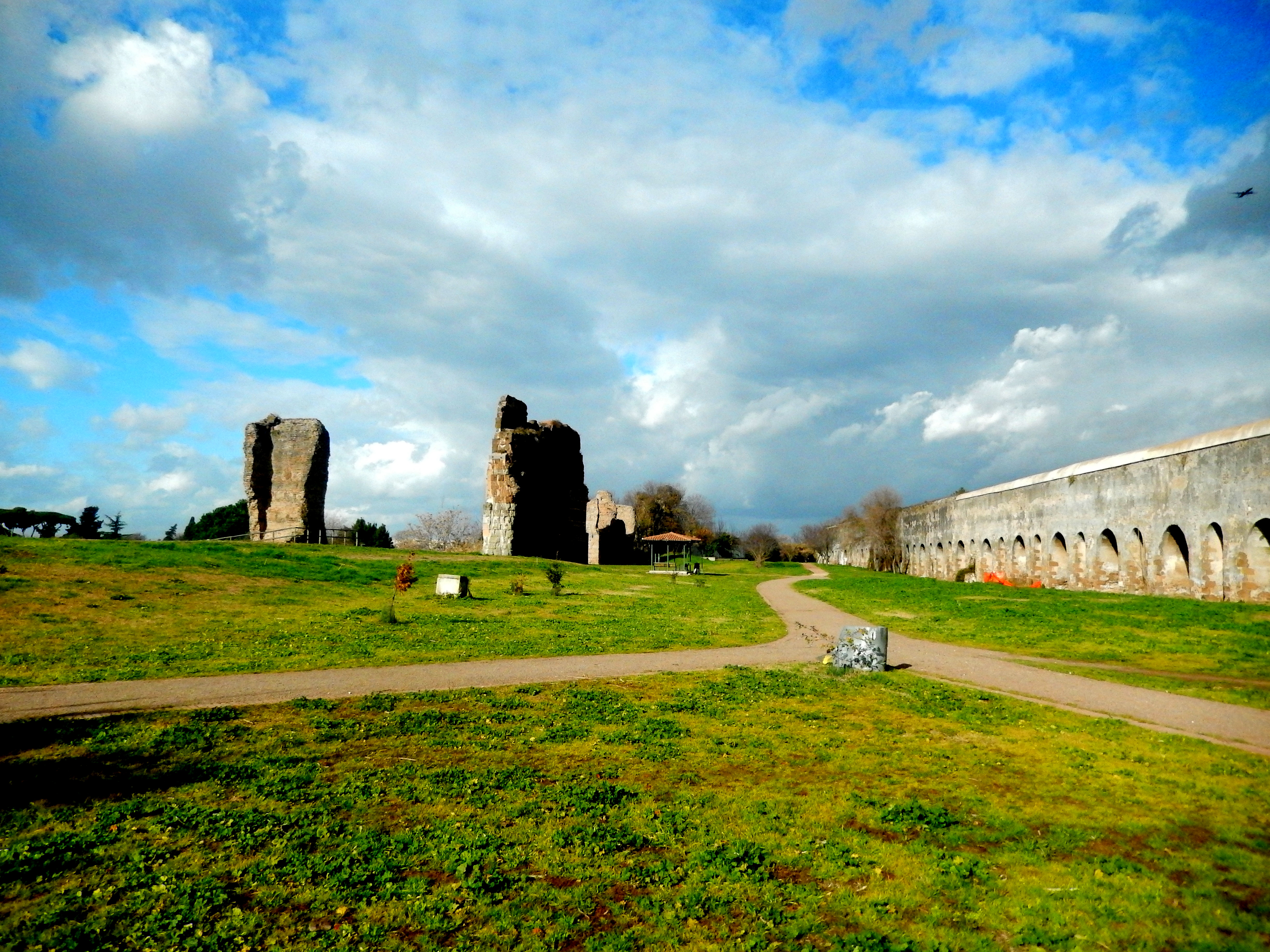
A view of the aqueducts in the Tor Fiscale Park

The Tor Fiscale park in Rome is located between the 3rd and 4th miles of the Roman Via Latina and forms part of the Appian Way Regional Park. It is connected by a short path to Rome's Aqueduct Park and is dominated by a 30 m-high tower, which gives the park its name. Several aqueducts traversed the area and their remains are still visible.

== The aqueducts ==
Six Roman aqueducts criss-crossed the park area, including the Aqua Claudia, the Aqua Marcia and the Aqua Anio Novus. Much of Aqua Marcia was demolished to make way for the Aqua Felice, which was constructed in the Middle Ages. Aqua Claudia was almost fully dismantled over the centuries to provide building materials for new houses.

== Military history ==
The area of the park was suitable to be transformed into a fortified zone, which could be used to control both the Via Latina and the Appian Way. This was first done by the Ostrogoths during the Siege of Rome (537–38) in the early years of the Gothic War (535–554). They closed in the arches of the aqueducts to provide a fortified camp, enabling them to block the flow of supplies to the city via the Via Appia and the Via Latina. They also interrupted the flow of water to the city by severing the aqueducts. Subsequently, the area took on the name of Campus Barbaricus. Its strategic importance meant that it continued to be used by invading armies. For example, in 1084 the troops of Robert Guiscard, who had come to the aid of Pope Gregory VII in his struggle with the Holy Roman Emperor Henry IV, pitched their camp in this area.

== The tower ==
Tor Fiscale

The Tor Fiscale dates back to the 13th Century, with the first written record from 1277. It is situated at one of the two crossing points of the Claudia and Marcia aqueducts. The tower is square and is made of tuff, with a few rows of bricks, and small rectangular windows. On the west side there is a small depressed arch, built, perhaps, to relieve the weight of the wall above the foundations of the aqueducts. The tower was originally surrounded by a rampart, remains of which could be seen until the mid-twentieth century. It originally served as a watch tower, as part of a small castle owned by the Annibaldi family. The name of Fiscale attributed to the tower appears not to come from a tax-collecting function, as was one role of the nearby Tomb of Caecilia Metella on the Appian Way, but from the fact that at one time the estate belonged to the Papal Treasurer.

== See also ==
- List of parks and gardens in Rome
