= Annibaldi family =

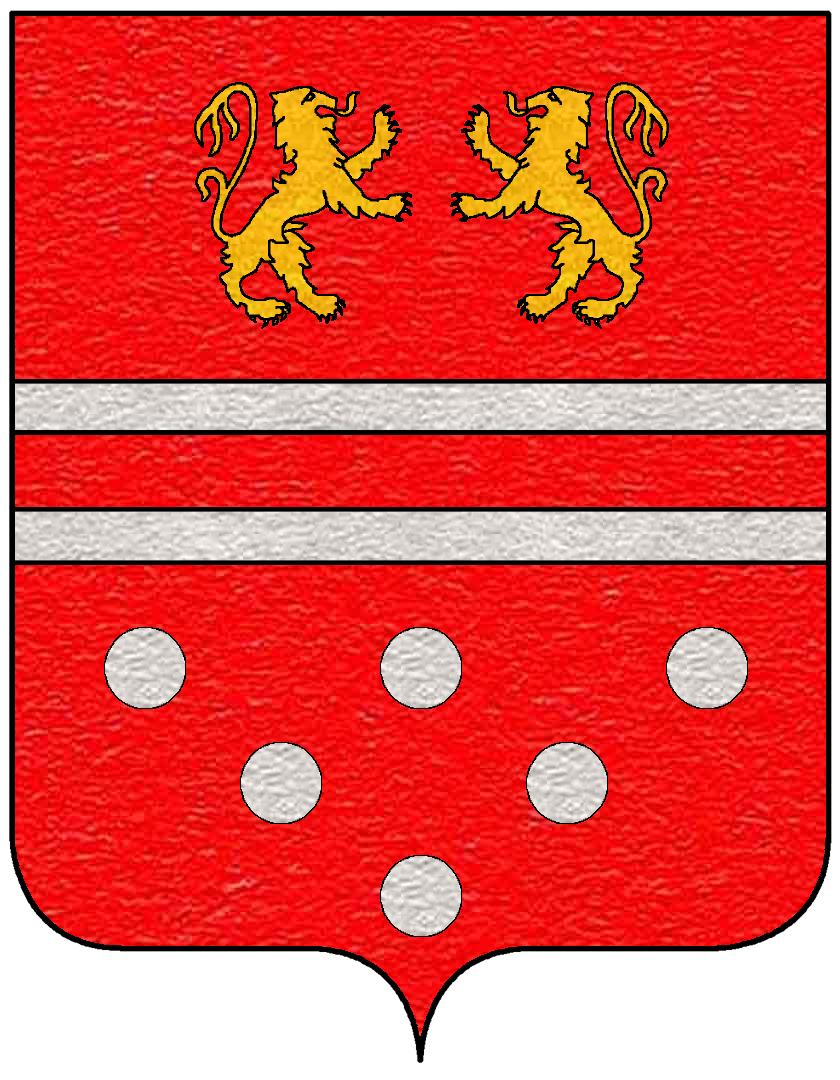
Coat of arms of the Annibaldi family

The Annibaldi were a powerful baronial family of Rome and the Lazio in the Middle Ages. They began to rise to prominence in the 13th century with the favour of Popes Gregory IX and Alexander IV, in the vacuum left by the Counts of Tusculum. In the late years of the same century they were however overwhelmed by the Caetani.

== History ==
The family's most outstanding figure was Riccardo Annibaldi (1210–1276), who was created cardinal in 1237 by Gregory IX, and bought the fief of Molara. Other family lines than that originated with Riccardo were those of Monte Compatri, Castel Zancato and of the Colosseum. Riccardo was the first protector of the Augustinian Order.

Another cardinal of the family was the Dominican Annibaldo degli Annibaldi (1230c.-1272c.), who completed his preliminary studies at the Santa Sabina studium conventuale in Rome, and later was sent to the studium generale of the Dominican Order in Paris c. 1255. Annibaldo was an associate of Albertus Magnus and Thomas Aquinas. Thomas dedicated his Catena aurea, drawn up while he was living at the Santa Sabina studium, to Annibaldo Annibaldi. Annibaldo was named Master of the Sacred Palace by Pope Innocent IV in 1246. He was named a cardinal in the Consistory of May 1262, and died in 1272.

== See also ==
- Tor Fiscale Park, Rome

== Sources ==
- Fedele Savio, SJ, "Gli Annibaldi di Roma nel secolo XIII," Studi e documenti di storia e diritto 17 (1896) 353–363.
- Francis Roth, OESA, "Il Cardinale Riccardo Annibaldi, Primo Prottetore dell' Ordine Agostiniano," Augustiniana 2 (1952) 26–60.
- Francis X. Roth, Cardinal Richard Annibaldi, first protector of the Augustinian Order, 1243-1276 : a study of the order before and after its Great Union in 1256 (Louvain: Nova et Vetera, 1952–1954).
- Robert Brentano, Rome Before Avignon: A Social History of Thirteenth Century Rome (New York: Basic Books 1974).
- Marc Dikmans, "D' Innocent III à Boniface VIII. Histoire des Conti et des Annibaldi," Bulletin de l' Institut historique belge de Rome 45 (1975) 19-211.
- Sandro Carocci, Baroni di Roma: Dominazioni signorili e lignaggi aristocratici nel Ducento e nel primo Trecento (Roma: Istituto storico italiano per il Medio Evo, 1993) [Collection de l'École française de Rome, 181].
- Mathias Thumser, Rom und der römische Adel in der späten Stauferzeit (Tübingen: Niemeyer 1995).
- Sandro Carocci, La nobiltà romana nel medioevo (Rome: Ecole française de Rome, 2006).
- Valter Lori, Storia di famiglie romane (Valter Lori 2015).
