= Villa Ada =

Park in Rome, Italy

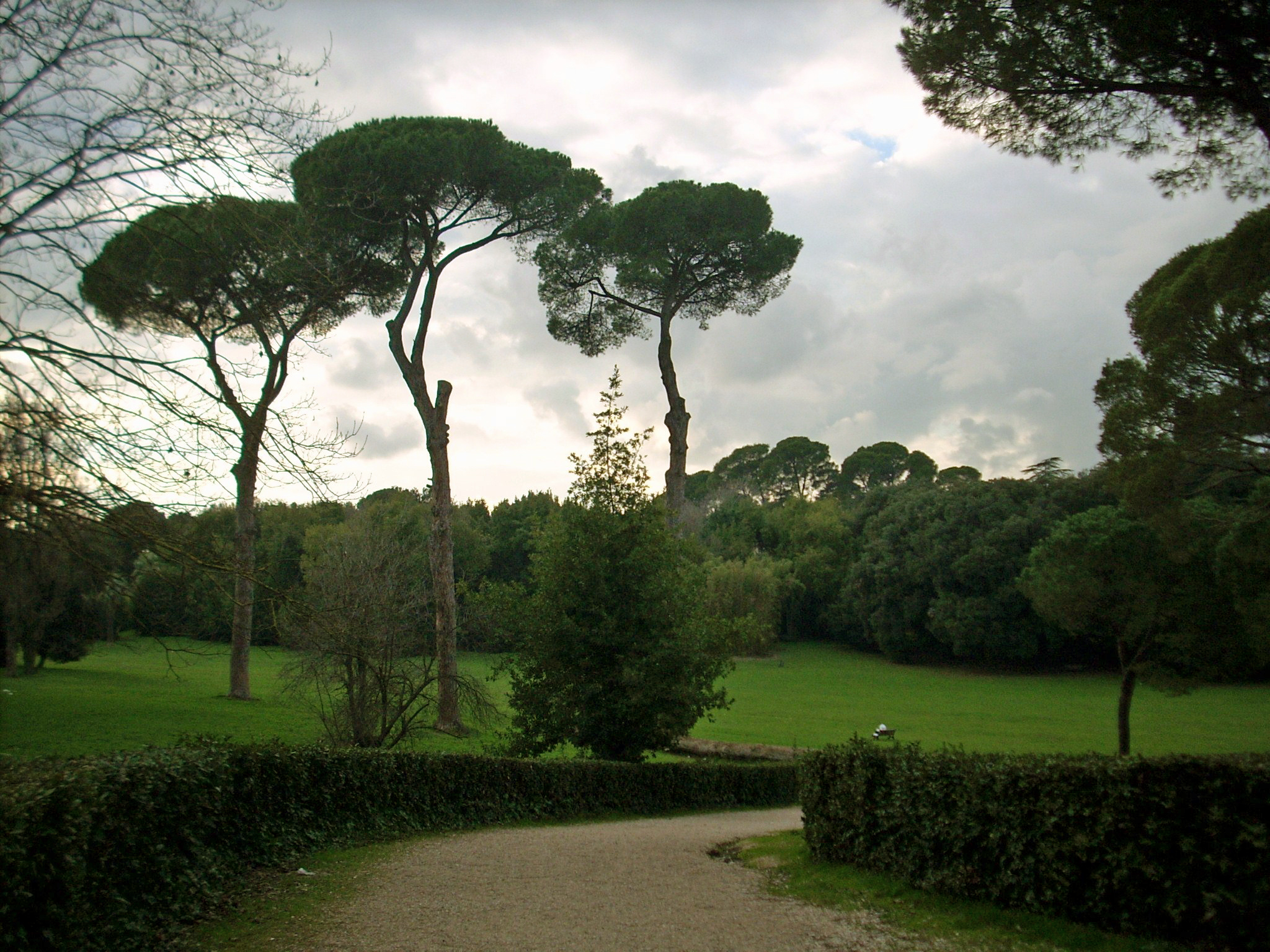
- View of Villa Ada
- Click on the map for a fullscreen view
- Coordinates: 41°55′55″N 12°30′05″E

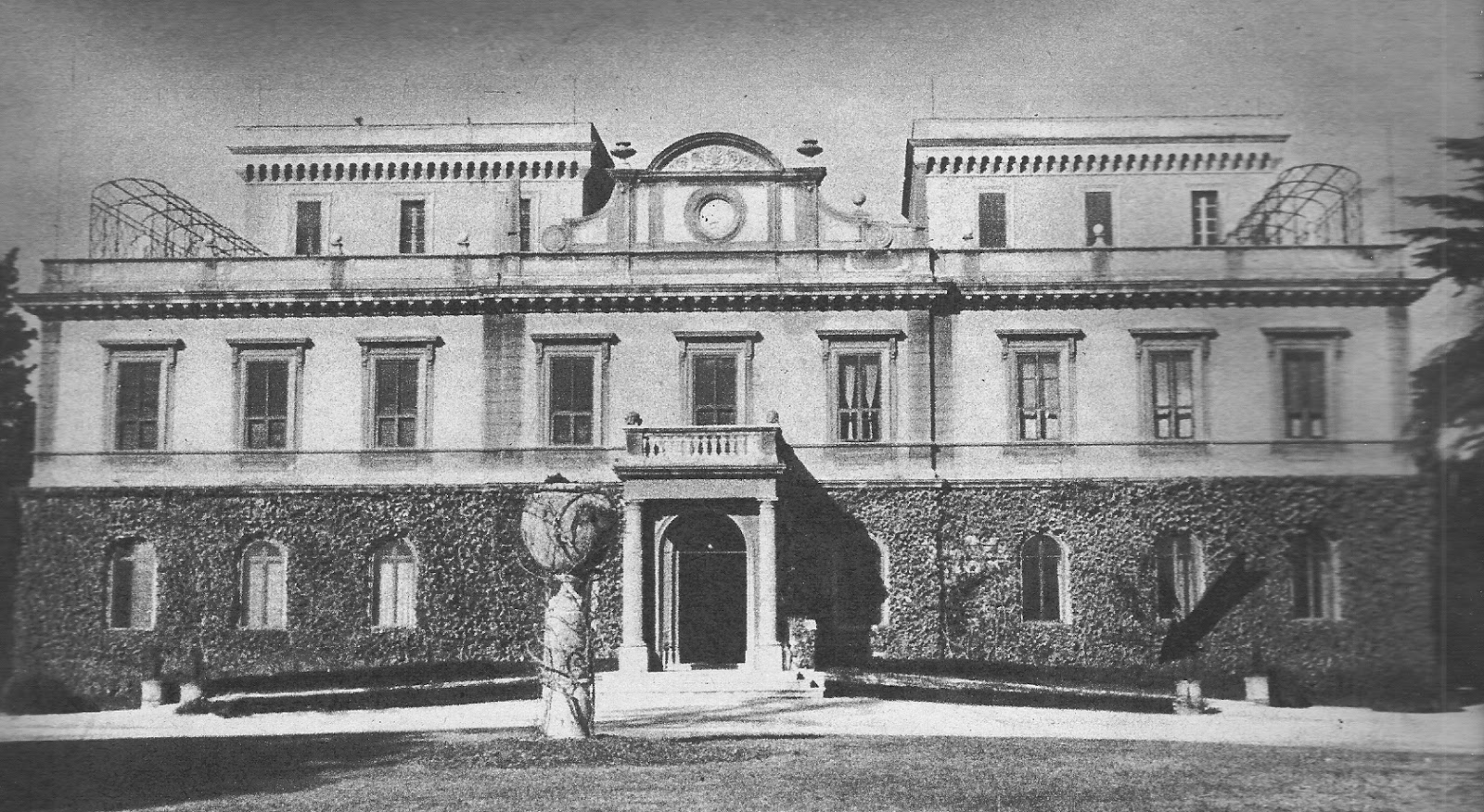
Villa Ada: the royal residence within the park

Villa Ada is a park in Rome, Italy, with a surface of 180 hectares (450 acres; 1.8 km^{2}) It is the second largest in the city after Villa Doria Pamphili. It is located in the northeastern part of the city.

== History ==
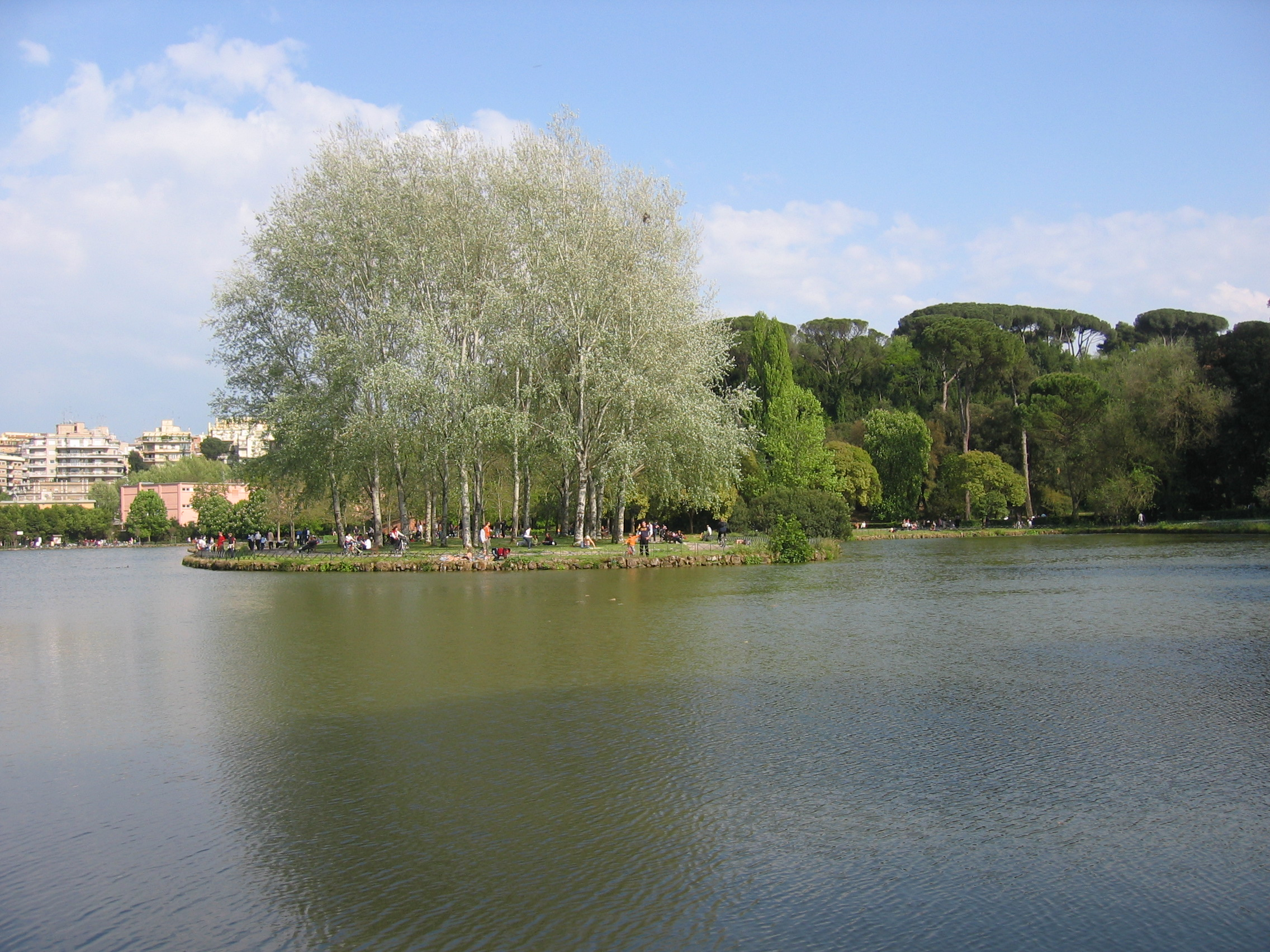
Isle in Villa Ada's lake.

The wooded expanse was owned by the Italian royal House of Savoy in the latter half of the nineteenth century; it contained the royal residence (1872–1878). In 1878 the area came under the control of Count Giuseppe Telfener (1839-1898, administrator of the private assets of the House of Savoy), who named it in honor of his wife Ada.

The royal family regained control of the land in 1904 and they retained control of the area until 1946. During their ownership it came to be known as Villa Savoia.

== Present status ==
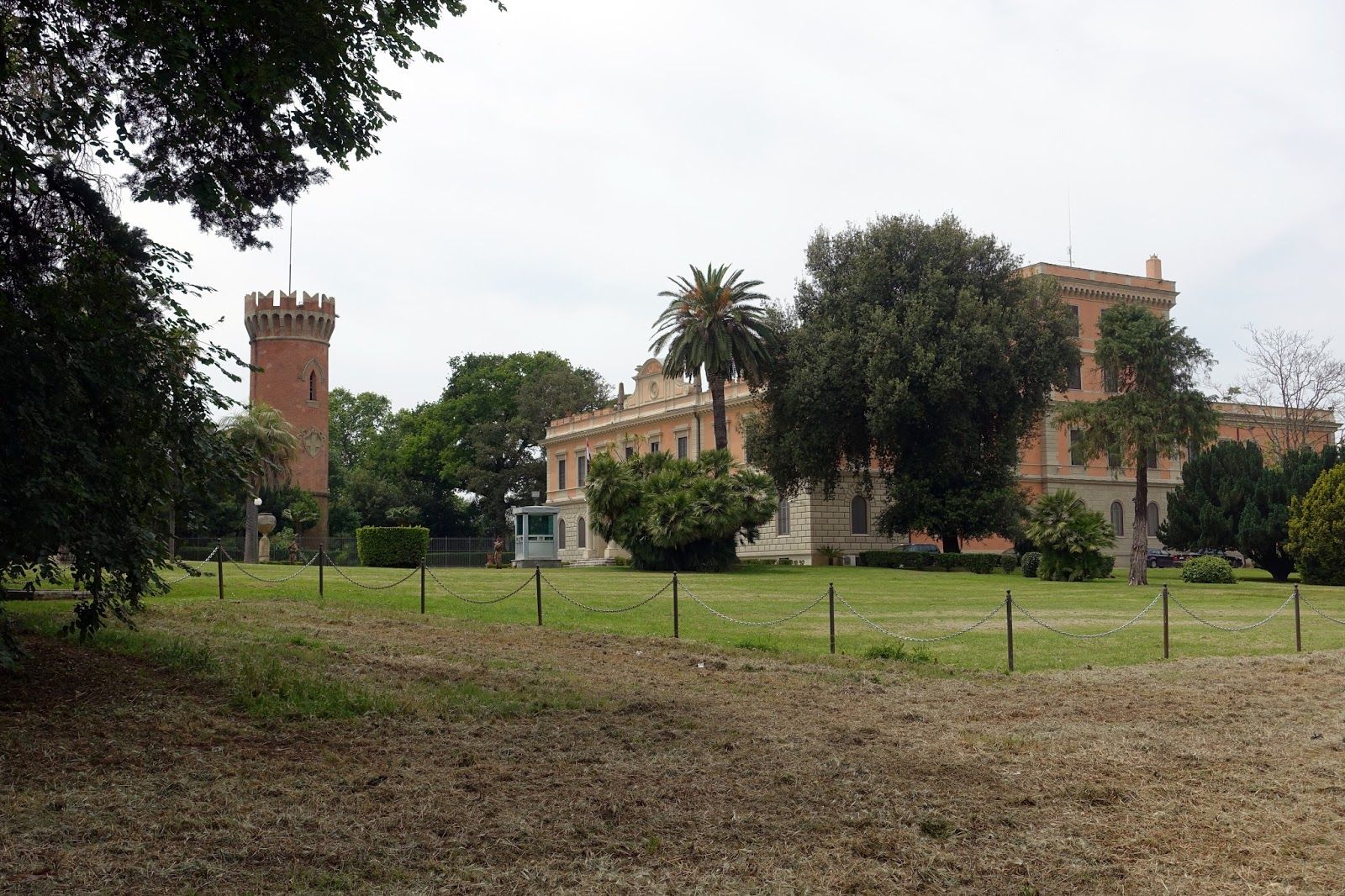
Villa Savoia, now the Egyptian Embassy

As of 2009 the area contains both public and private areas. The public area is controlled by the Council of Rome; the private area is controlled by the Egyptian Embassy, although the Town Council has made a formal claim to take control of the whole area. The private portion is under constant patrol by police or army personnel.

== Activities ==
The public portion of the park is much larger than the private area. It contains an artificial lake and many trees, including stone pines, holm oaks, laurels and a very rare metasequoia, imported from Tibet in 1940. Entrance to the park is free. One may rent canoes, bicycles, or riding horses. There is a large swimming pool.

Since 1994, during the summer the park hosts the world-music festival and the "Roma incontra il mondo" (Rome meets the World) festival, against racism, war and the death penalty.

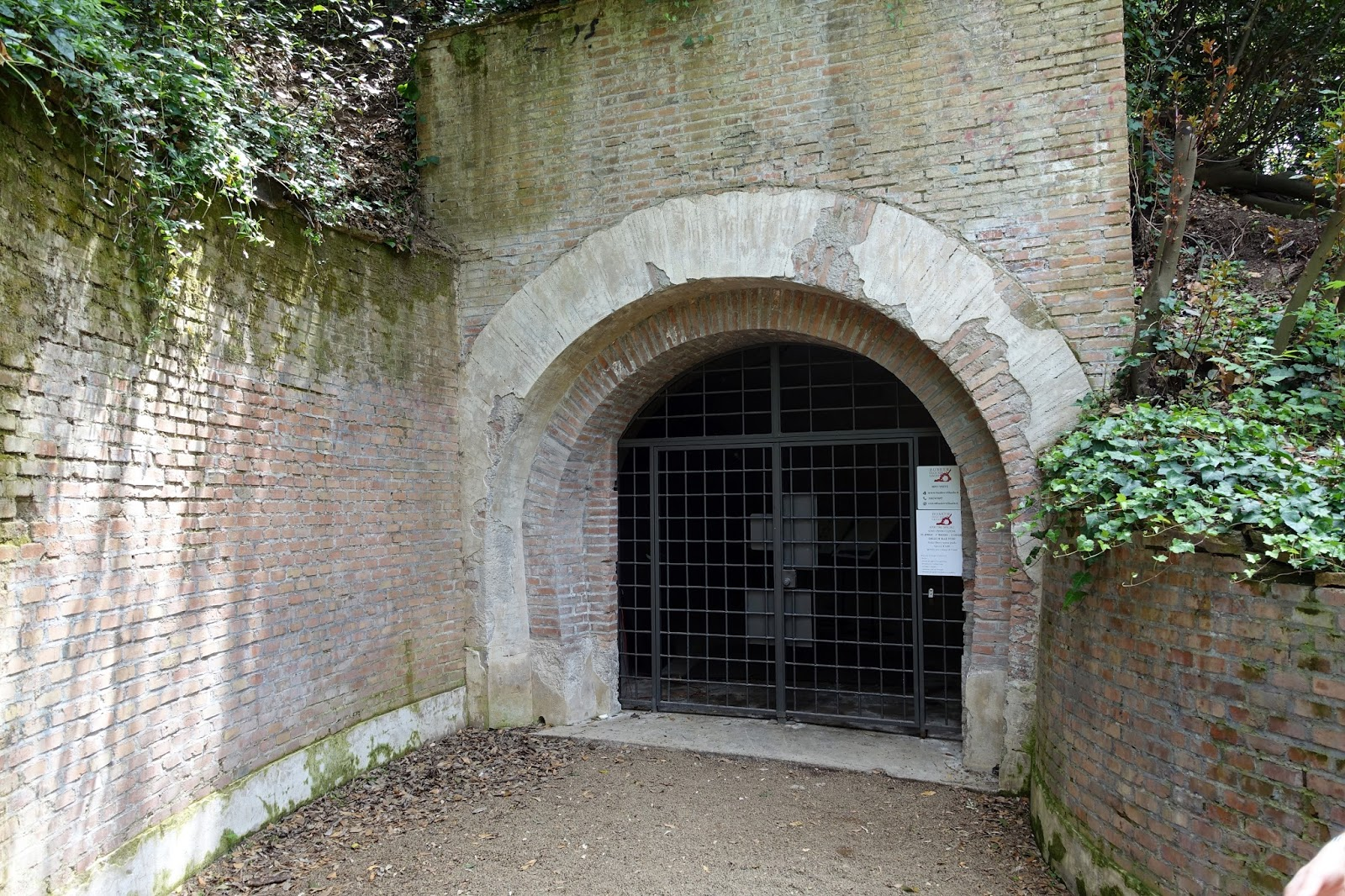
Entrance today to Bunker Villa Savoia

The "Bunker Villa Ada Savoia," a bunker built in the early 1940s by the House of Savoy to protect King Victor Emmanuel III and Queen Elena from Allied bombs, is now open for tours. The non-profit association, Roma Sotteranea, restored the bunker, which had fallen to ruin and had been vandalized, and runs the tours for a small cost.

Benito Mussolini was taken captive by King Victor Emmanuel III during World War II from that house.

== See also ==
- List of parks and gardens in Rome
- Villa Doria Pamphili

Preceded by Bioparco di Roma	Landmarks of Rome; Villa Ada	Succeeded by Villa Borghese gardens
