= American Institute for Roman Culture =

Non-profit organization

The American Institute For Roman Culture
- Formation: 2002; 24 years ago
- Legal status: 501(c)(3)
- Headquarters: Naples, Florida, United States
- Leader: Darius Arya
- Website: romanculture.org

The American Institute For Roman Culture (AIRC) is a non-profit organization. The AIRC has classrooms in Naples, Florida, United States, and Rome, Italy, providing students education in Italian history and contemporary Italian culture.

== Organization history ==
The American Institute for Roman Culture was founded in 2002 by archaeologist Darius Arya and architect Tom Rankin. The organization is a non-profit 501(c)(3) founded in Massachusetts. In 2003, AIRC inaugurated its first project, the Post Aedem Castoris excavation in the Roman Forum led by Drs. Jennifer Trimble (Stanford University) and Andrew Wilson (Oxford University). By its third and final season in 2005, AIRC students counted for 1/3 of the summer field school's participants.

The success of the collaboration led to two AIRC-organized, semester-long architecture programs with California Polytechnic State University and Northeastern University. From 2007 until 2011, AIRC hosted a semester-long classics program and "Maymester" program with the College of the Holy Cross. Arya has served as AIRC's CEO/Executive Director since spring 2008, acting as principal fundraiser and liaison with the Italian Ministry of Culture.

== Ancient Rome Live ==
Ancient Rome Live (ARL) is AIRC's documentary film division that showcases the culture of Ancient Rome. ARL produces original documentary films of cultural heritage sites in English, with the objective of exposing these sites to a wider audience than accessible through only the Italian language. Production experience began after Arya's appearances in several documentaries featured on History Channel and National Geographic, including a 2011 video documentary course in Rome with Northeastern University students.

In 2011, Fasti Online, the main digital database of active archeological excavations in Italy, invited AIRC to produce video documentaries of participating sites. AIRC has filmed six documentaries at sites in Rome, including Palatine, Oppian Hill, Sant'Omobono, Gabii, San Marco, and Pompeii. More than 35 other active projects have since requested documentation by the AIRC.

== Study abroad programs ==
The AIRC offers study abroad programs for university students and scholars.

Semester Signature Program - The AIRC offers a semester program that runs for 14 weeks with a one-week break, both in the fall and spring academic semesters. The program, entitled "History, Media, and Cultural Heritage", is open to university students and scholars from all majors, and consists of 3 core courses and a choice of 2 or 3 elective courses.

The core courses are Rome: Layers of History, Discovering Italy, and Elementary Italian.

- Elective courses offered: Communications and Journalism in Italy; Social Media, Video, and Cultural Heritage; Late Medieval to Baroque Art History; Environmental and Geological Sciences of Rome; The City of Rome in Television and Cinema; as well as Latin and Greek.
- Summer Programs: The AIRC conducts a variety of short-term programs in a broad range of topic areas during the summer months:
- Archaeology Field School Excavation Program: A six-week intensive program held in June–July with one week of specialized academic instruction by archaeologists and AIRC professors and five weeks of on-site field work. The program includes visits to major Roman museums and open-air sites to augment field studies and provide participants with a broader context of what life was like in ancient Rome.
- Documentary Film Program: This program runs for four to five weeks, in which participants learn the basics of shooting, editing, and producing as they document a cultural heritage site in or around Rome in need of increased awareness and conservation.
- Living Latin Program: An intensive program with PhD level professors of Latin who impart grammar, syntax, and vocabulary through related readings of poetry and prose from various moments in Rome's history. Students also engage with Latin as a spoken language. Morning classroom teaching is followed by afternoon walks through the city, where students read ancient authors in the locations where history happened, as well as inscriptions in their original locations.

=== Special programs with affiliated Universities ===
- Documentary Film Program with Northeastern University - This program runs each summer for a four or five week session in which students from Northeastern University learn techniques of editing and production as they produce an actual documentary film based on a cultural heritage site of importance in Rome. In 2011, the students produced films on the historical port town of Ostia Antica.

== Sustainability/conservation projects ==
- Ostia Antica Conservation Project
- Santa Maria Antiqua in the Forum Romanum
- Villa delle Vignacce excavation of a 2nd-century bath house and discovery of statue of Marsyas
- Villa Ravennati (2013–2017) excavation of early Christian tombs and discovery of mosaic floor

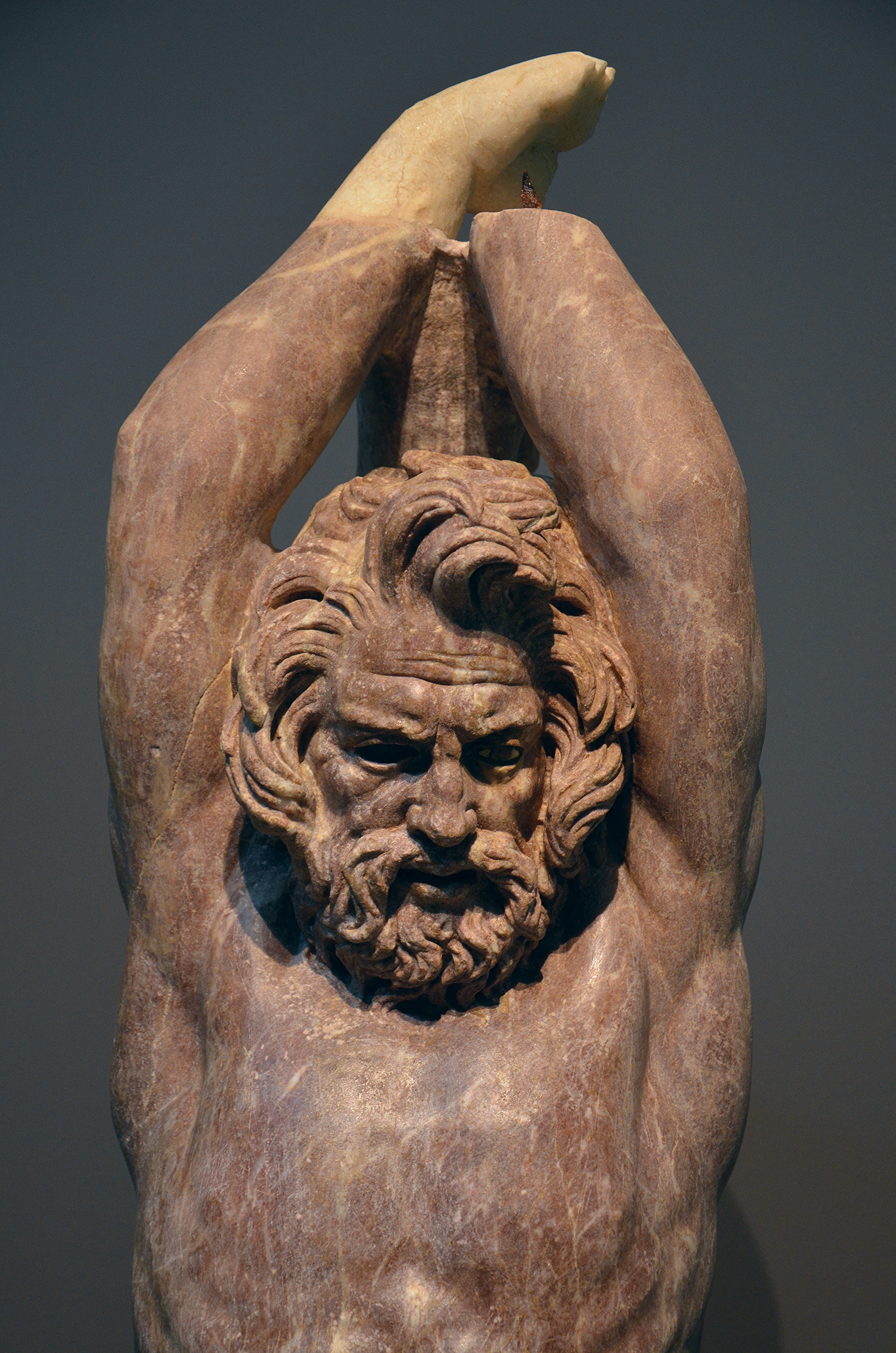
AD statue in red marble of Marsyas, a satyr who dared challenge Apollo to a music contest

The AIRC has been a participant in the funding of the important conservation of frescoes of the Santa Maria Antiqua Church in the Forum Romanum for the past five years.

== Partnership with the Italian Ministry of Culture ==
The AIRC provides English language content translation for the Italian Ministry of Culture's General Directorate of Management and Promotion of Cultural Heritage. This includes content for their social media platforms as well as the English-language version of the General Directorates' website. This partnership allows AIRC access to cultural heritage sites under the management and jurisdiction of the Italian Ministry of Culture, which helps AIRC to further its mission.

== Annual "Unlisted" Conference ==
In 2011 the AIRC launched the "Unlisted" Conference. The conference is held each year in the spring, generally in March or April, for two days. Each participant presents and then submits an academic paper for the proceedings.

== Sponsorship ==
The AIRC has been the recipient of numerous grants including an NEH grant, American Express Foundation grant for the Villa delle Vignacce excavation, World Monument Fund (WMF) collaboration for Santa Maria project, anonymous angel grants, numerous donations from supporters in California, Pennsylvania, Nevada, Illinois, Massachusetts, New York, Ohio, West Virginia and Georgia.

== See also ==
- Rome
- Ostia Antica
- Villa delle Vignacce
