= Parco degli Acquedotti =

Park near Rome, Italy, with ancient Roman aqueducts

Park of the Aqueducts
- Parco degli Acquedotti
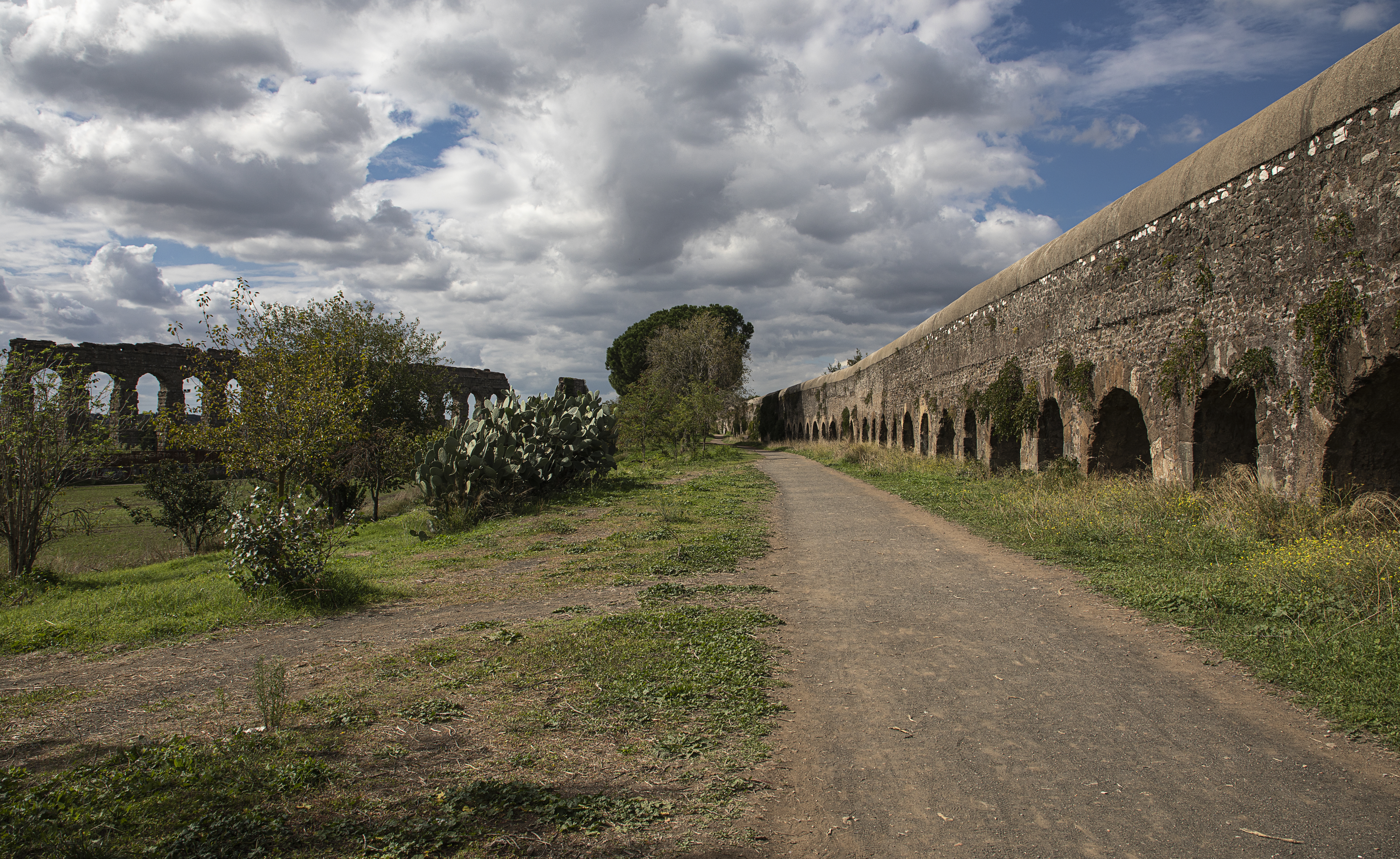
- Aqua Claudia

- Location within Italy
- Click on the map for a fullscreen view
- Location: Rome, Italy
- Coordinates: 41°50′49″N 12°33′43″E
- Area: 240 ha (593.05 acres)
- Authorized: 1988 upright

The Parco degli Acquedotti ("Park of the Aqueducts") is a public park to the southeast of Rome, Italy. It is part of the Appian Way Regional Park and is of approximately 240 ha.

== Description ==
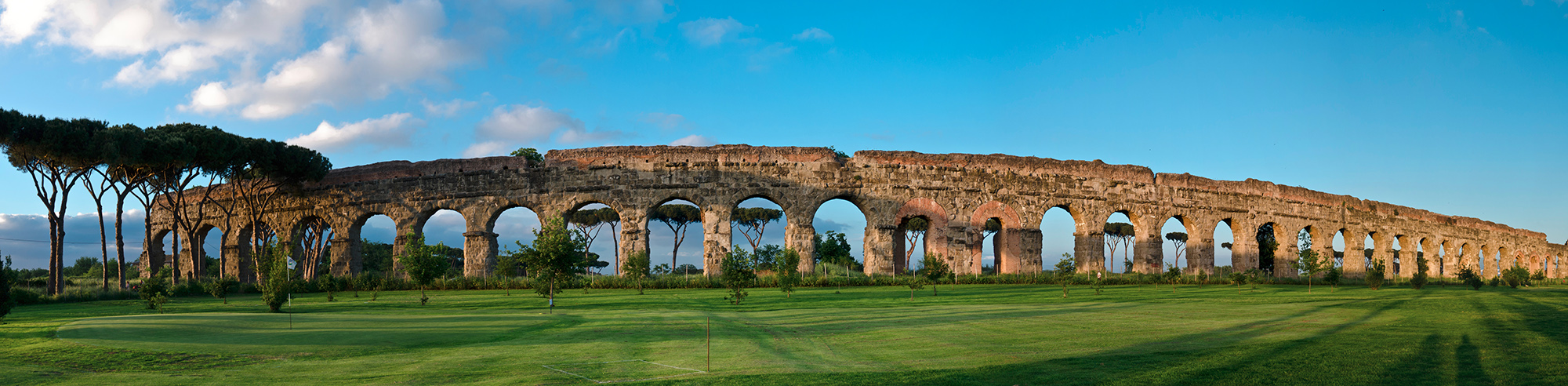
Wide-angled view of the park

The park is named after the aqueducts that run through it. It is crossed on one side by the Aqua Felix and also contains part of the Aqua Claudia and the remains of Villa delle Vignacce to the North West. A short stretch of the original Roman Via Latina can also be seen.

The park is near the Cinecittà film studios and is often used as a film location. In the opening shot of La Dolce Vita, a statue of Christ is suspended from a helicopter that flies along the route of the Aqua Claudia.

=== Aqueducts ===
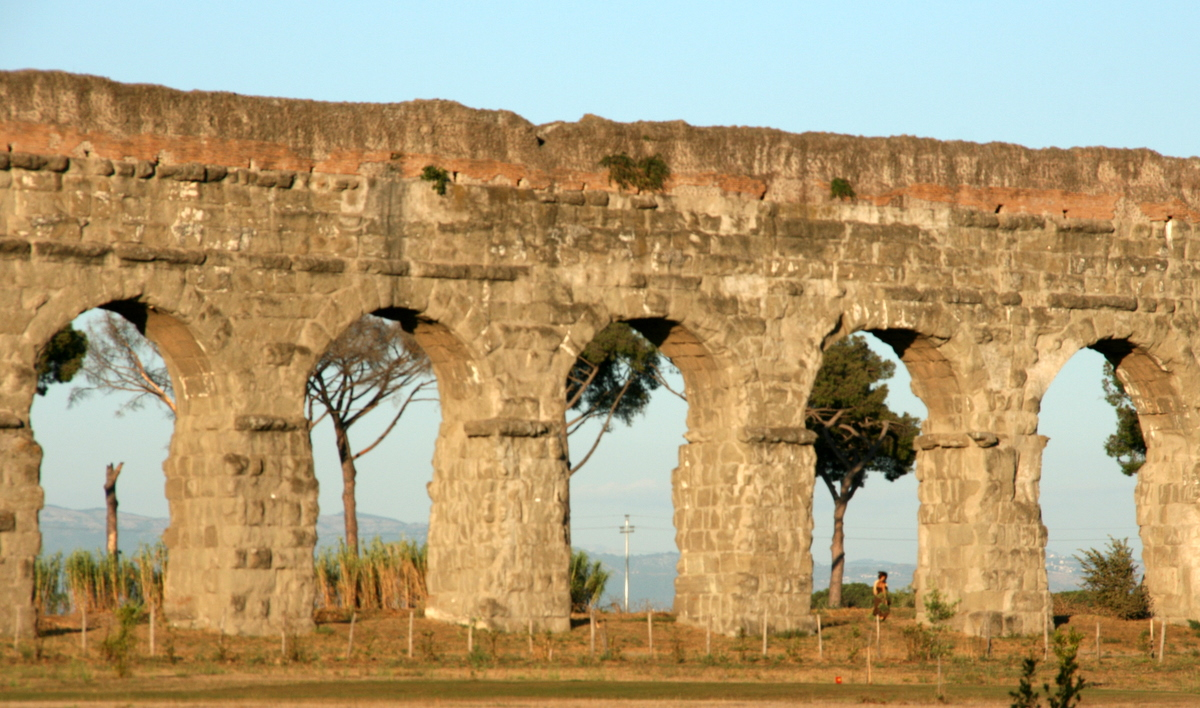
Aqua Claudia

- Aqua Claudia (38–52)
- Acqua Felice (1585–1590)
- Aqua Marcia is a very nice aqueduct The park has been used as a film set for several productions, including La dolce vita, Mamma Roma, Il marchese del Grillo, La grande bellezza, Totò, Peppino e la malafemmina and the television series Roma, I Cesaroni and Distretto di Polizia.

== See also ==
- Aqueduct
- Giulio Agricola (Rome Metro), the closest Metro station
- Roman aqueduct
- List of aqueducts in the city of Rome
- List of parks and gardens in Rome

Preceded by Villa Torlonia, Rome	Landmarks of Rome; Parco degli Acquedotti	Succeeded by Boncompagni Ludovisi Decorative Art Museum
