= Villa delle Vignacce =

Southern suburb of ancient Rome

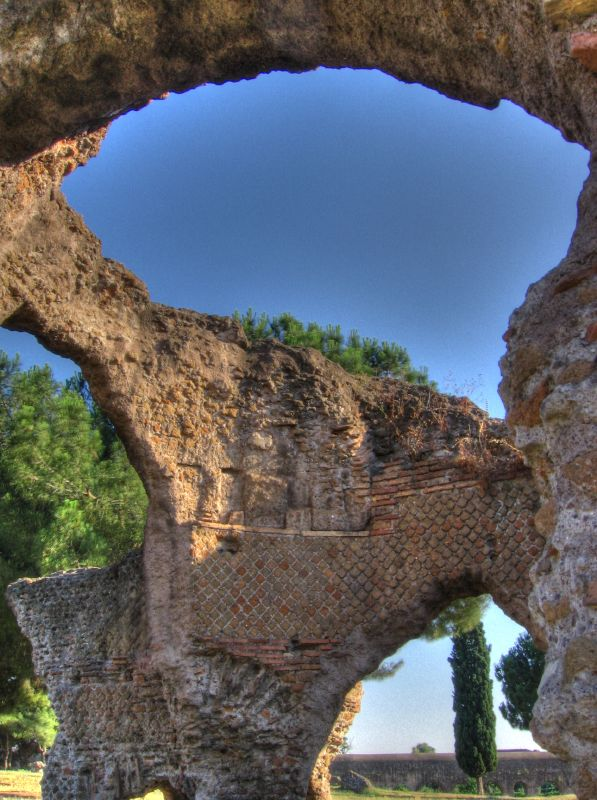
Villa delle Vignacce ruins

The so-called Villa delle Vignacce, or the "Villa of the Vineyards", was one of the largest villas in the southern suburbs of ancient Rome, located on via Lemonia, in the Parco degli Acquedotti, or Aqueduct Park. Constructed in the 2nd century AD, and showing signs of restoration in the 4th century, it still remains one of Rome's lesser documented villas, despite the extensive ruins being available in Rome's largest public park.

Based upon markings and studies of the brickwork, the construction of the luxurious villa is attributed to Quintus Servilius Pudens, an extremely wealthy friend of the emperor Hadrian. Of the remaining structure, there is a large circular hall covered with a dome. The villa is one of the most ancient examples of "amphorae" used to lighten inside areas. In the summer of 2006, excavations were done by the American Institute for Roman Culture (AIRC), funded by the American Express Foundation. AIRC, with American, Canadian, and Italian students and professionals, unearthed the ground floor of the villa 4 meters (13 ft) below modern street level.

The bath complex, complete with mosaic floors and marble walls, was discovered as well as a perfectly preserved ancient underground heating system. Rare glass paste mosaics from the 2nd century AD that had collapsed onto the ground floor were also found. In the summer of 2007, excavations revealed that the two-story complex covered more than 5 acres (20,000 m^{2}) and contained hot rooms, vaults, changing rooms, and marble latrines. The interior of the complex was decorated with statues and water cascades. Further excavations of the villa and analyses will continue in the bath complex, and other areas of the villa are supposed to be unearthed later in the summer of 2007.

== See also ==
- List of Roman domes
- Ancient Roman architecture
