= Aqua Claudia =

Ancient Roman aqueduct in Italy

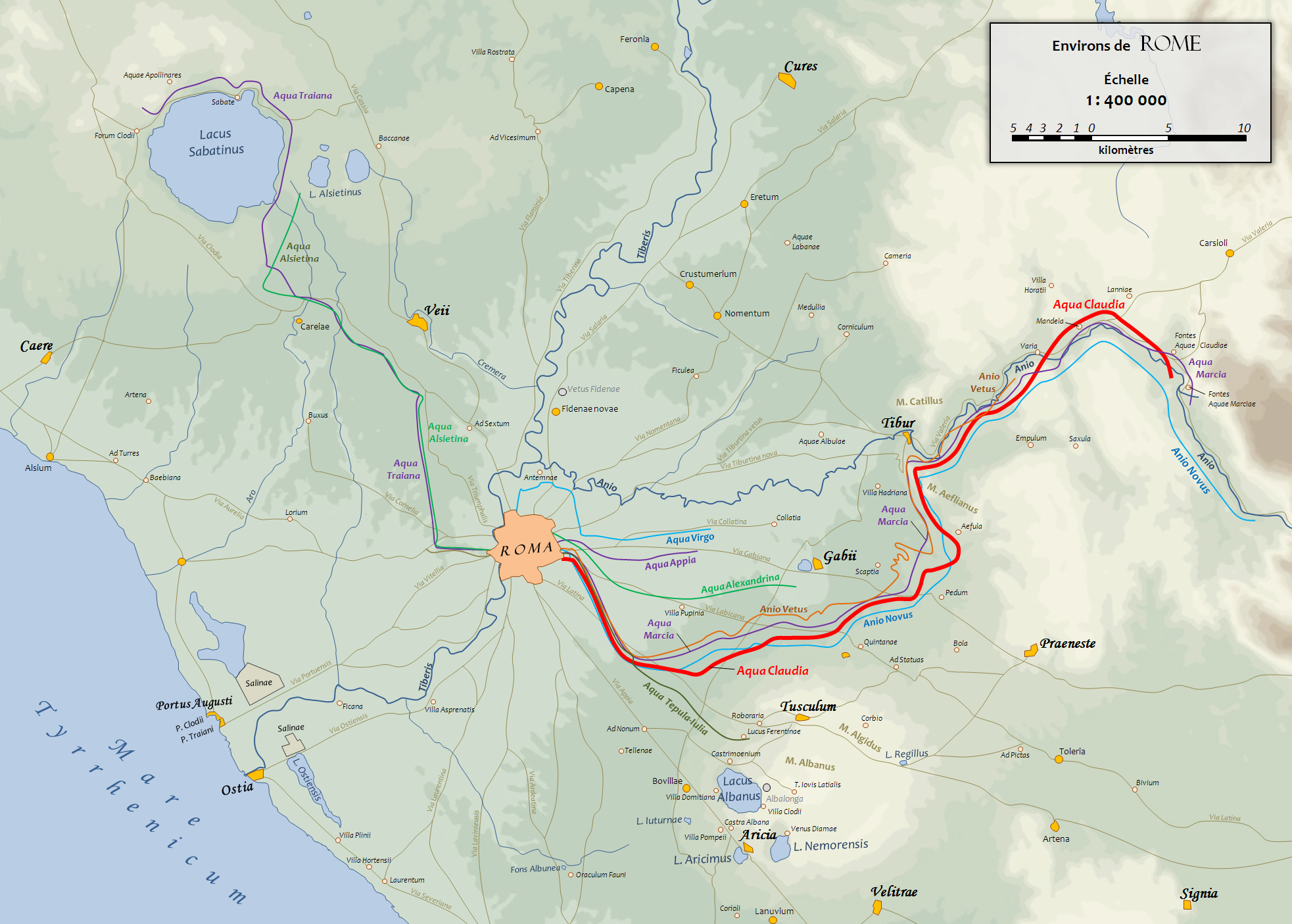
Route of the Aqua Claudia

Aqua Claudia ("the Claudian water") was an ancient Roman aqueduct that, like the Aqua Anio Novus, was begun by Emperor Caligula (37–41 AD) in 38 AD and finished by Emperor Claudius (41–54 AD) in 52 AD.

It was the eighth aqueduct to supply Rome and together with Aqua Anio Novus, Aqua Anio Vetus and Aqua Marcia, it is regarded as one of the "four great aqueducts of Rome".

== History ==
The aqueduct went through at least two major repairs. Tacitus suggests that the aqueduct was in use by AD 47. An inscription from the time of emperor Vespasian suggests that Aqua Claudia was used for ten years, then failed and was out of use for nine years. The first repairs took place during the reign of Vespasian in 71 AD. The aqueduct was repaired again in 81 AD by emperor Titus. Additionally, brick stamps from 123 AD testify to some restorations during the rule of emperor Hadrian. Honorary inscriptions from the 5th century show that repairs were done during the rule of Arcadius and the rule of Honorius too. Later repairs were made by Belisarius during the 6th century, and the pope Adrian I during the 8th century.

Alexander Severus reinforced the arches of Nero (CIL VI.1259) where they are called arcus Caelimontani, including the line of arches across the valley between the Caelian and the Palatine.

The church of San Tommaso in Formis was later built into the side of the aqueduct.

== Route ==
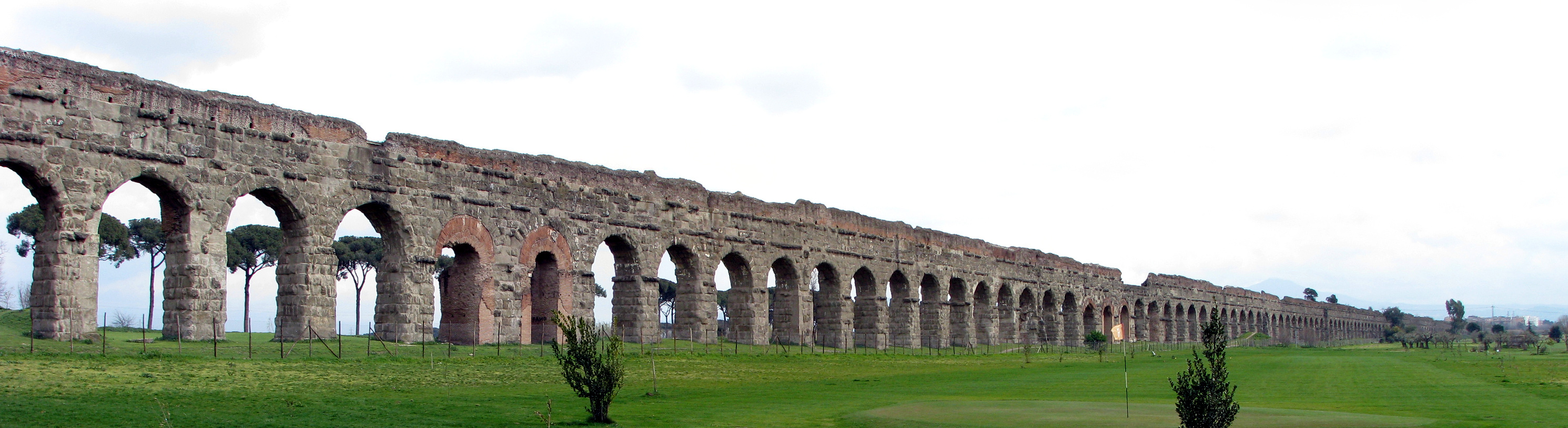
Panoramic view of the aqueduct (near the Via Lemonia)

Its mainsprings, the Caeruleus and Curtius, were situated near the 38th milestone of the Via Sublacensis.

The total length was approximately 69 kilometres (43 mi), most of which was underground. The flow was about 185,000 m^{3} (6,500,000 cu ft) in 24 hours—ca. 2.3 m^{3}/s (80 cu ft/s). Directly after its filtering tank, near the seventh mile of the Via Latina, it finally emerged onto arches, which increase in height as the ground falls toward the city, reaching over 30 metres (100 ft).

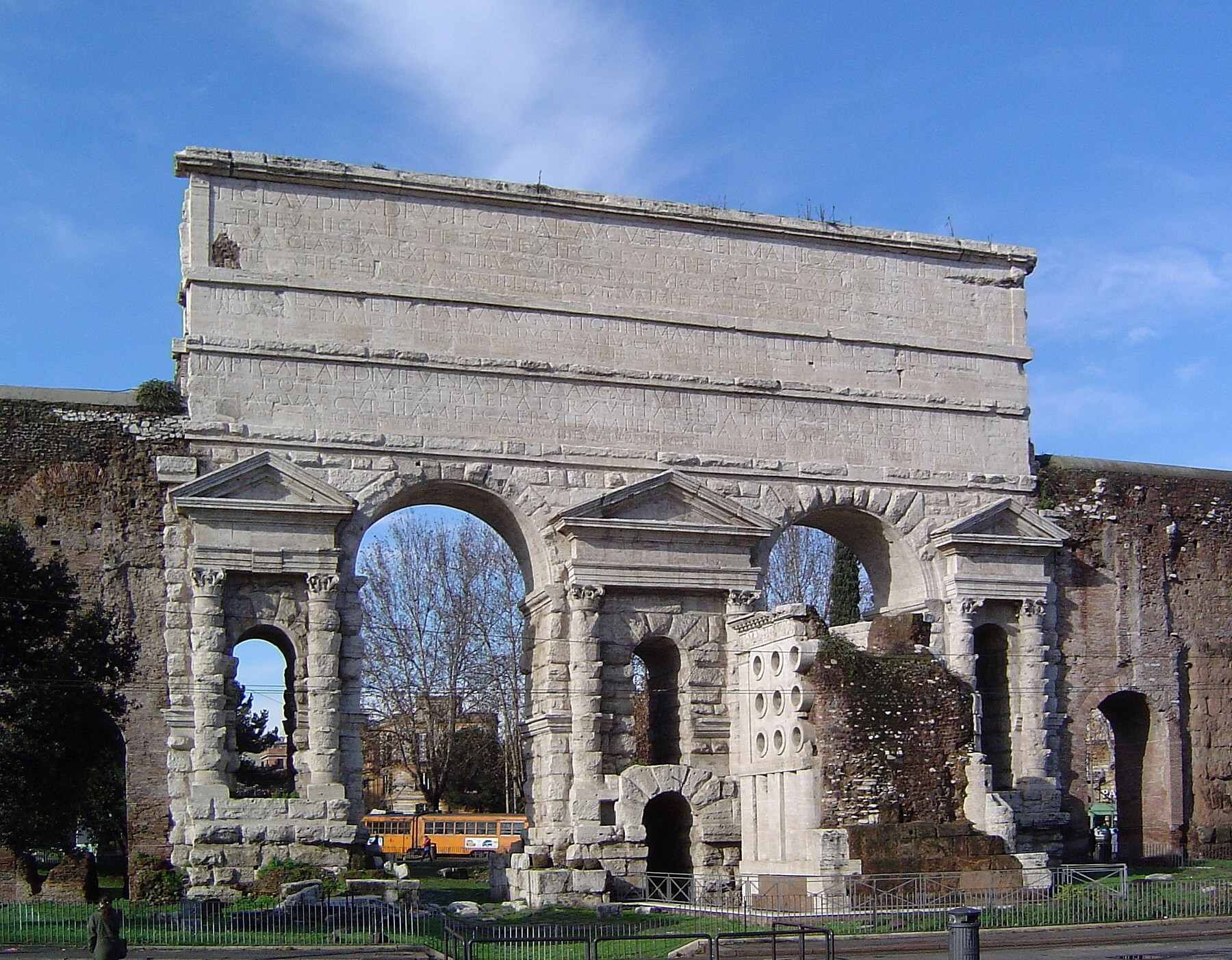
Porta Maggiore in Rome: remains of aqueducts Aqua Claudia and Aqua Anio Novus, integrated into the Aurelian Wall as a gate in 271 AD.

It is one of the two ancient aqueducts that flowed through the Porta Maggiore, the other being the Aqua Anio Novus. It is described in some detail by Frontinus in his work published in the later 1st century, De aquaeductu.

Nero extended the aqueduct with the Arcus Neroniani from (Spes Vetus on) the Esquiline hill to the Caelian hill and Domitian further extended it to the Palatine, after which the Aqua Claudia could provide all 14 Roman districts with water. The section on the Caelian hill was called arcus Caelimontani.

=== Bridges ===
Visible remaining bridges include the Ponte sul Fosso della Noce, Ponte San Antonio, Ponte delle Forme Rotte, Ponte dell`Inferno, Ponte Barucelli.

==== Ponte dell`Inferno ====
The bridge has a single arch in opus quadratum, reinforced in the late period in brickwork. The specus (channel) is about 1 m wide and is also built in opus quadratum, but with a very porous stone which is locally found as a layer immediately above the tuff on which the bridge rests.

==== Ponte Barucelli ====
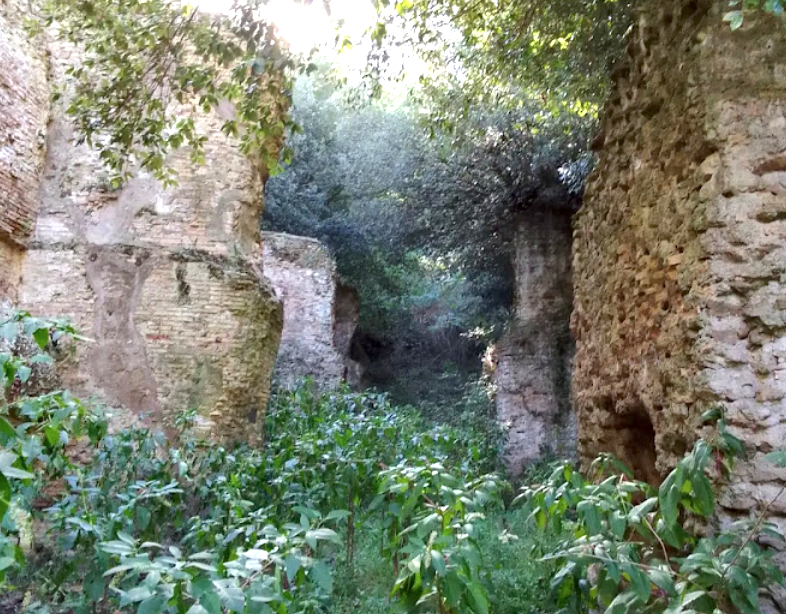
Ponte Barucelli

The Ponte Barucelli (also known as Ponte Diruto) is made up of two monumental bridges 8 m apart for the aqua Claudia (to the north) the Anio Novus (to the south) to cross the Acqua Nera stream. Both date to between 38 and 52 AD. They were later strengthened with buttresses and reinforcements, becoming two huge continuous and connected structures.

The Anio Novus bridge, about 85 m long and about 10 m wide, has a few small arches except for the main high and narrow one for the Acqua Nera. It had originally been built of tuff in opus quadratum. In the second half of the 1st century it was reinforced in opus mixtum, visible at the two east end buttresses. At the beginning of the 3rd century nine rectangular buttresses were added at regular intervals on the north side while on the south side only three were added near the bed of the stream, later increased by five on the west bank in poor opus latericium and two on the east in opus mixtum.

Later the two bridges were connected by three brick arches and with buttresses.

== Gallery ==
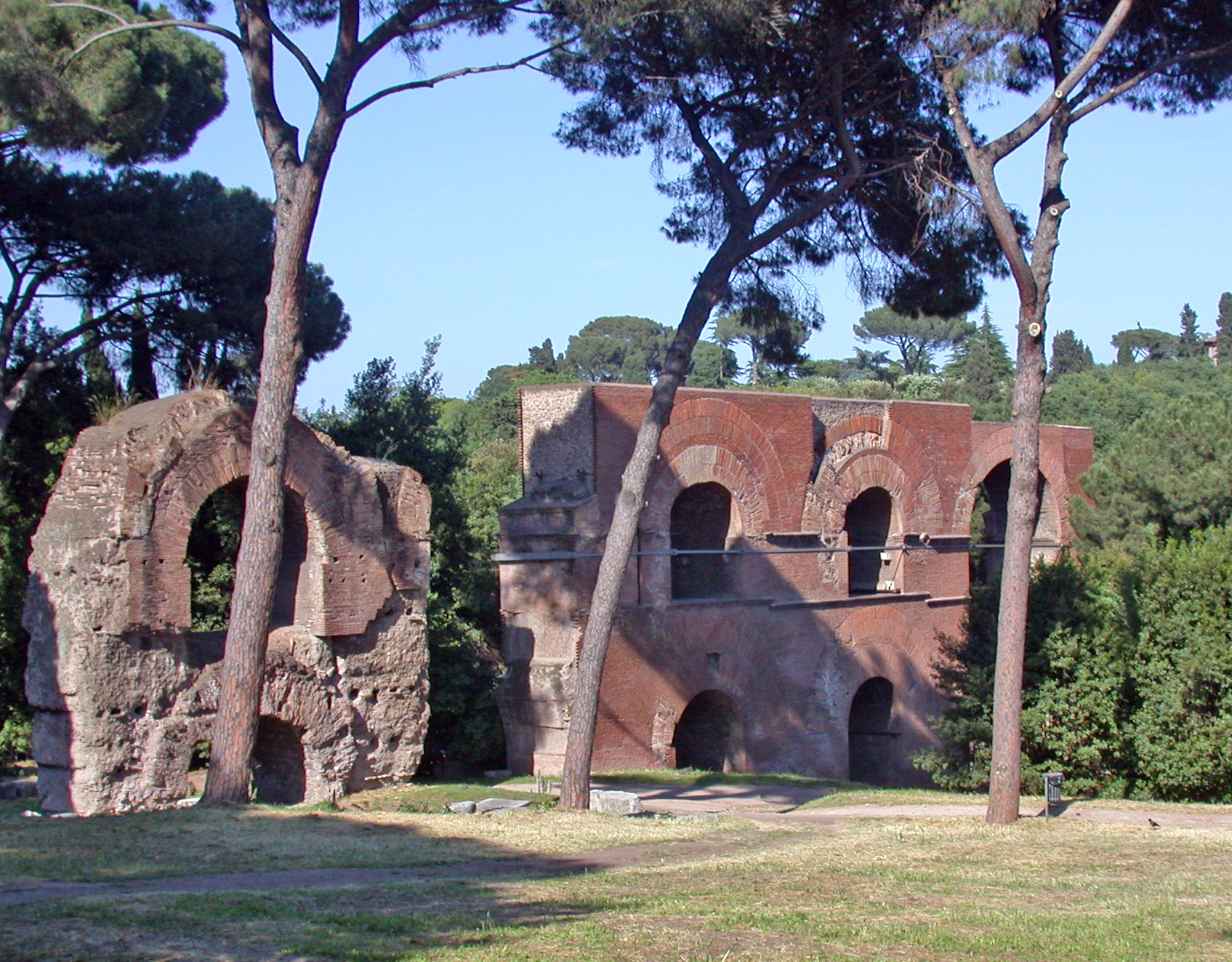
The Arcus Nerioniani near the Caelian and the Palatine Hills.

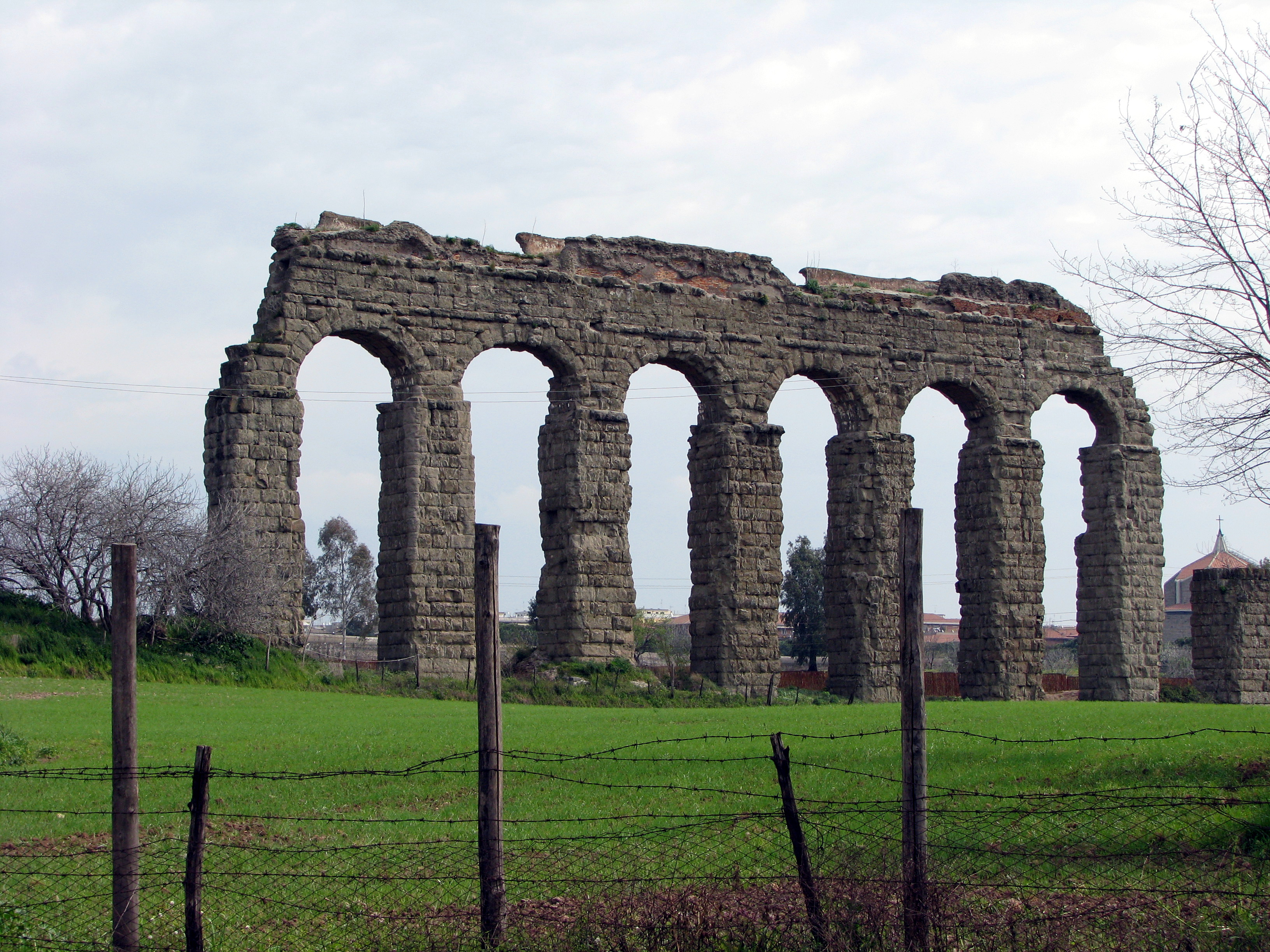

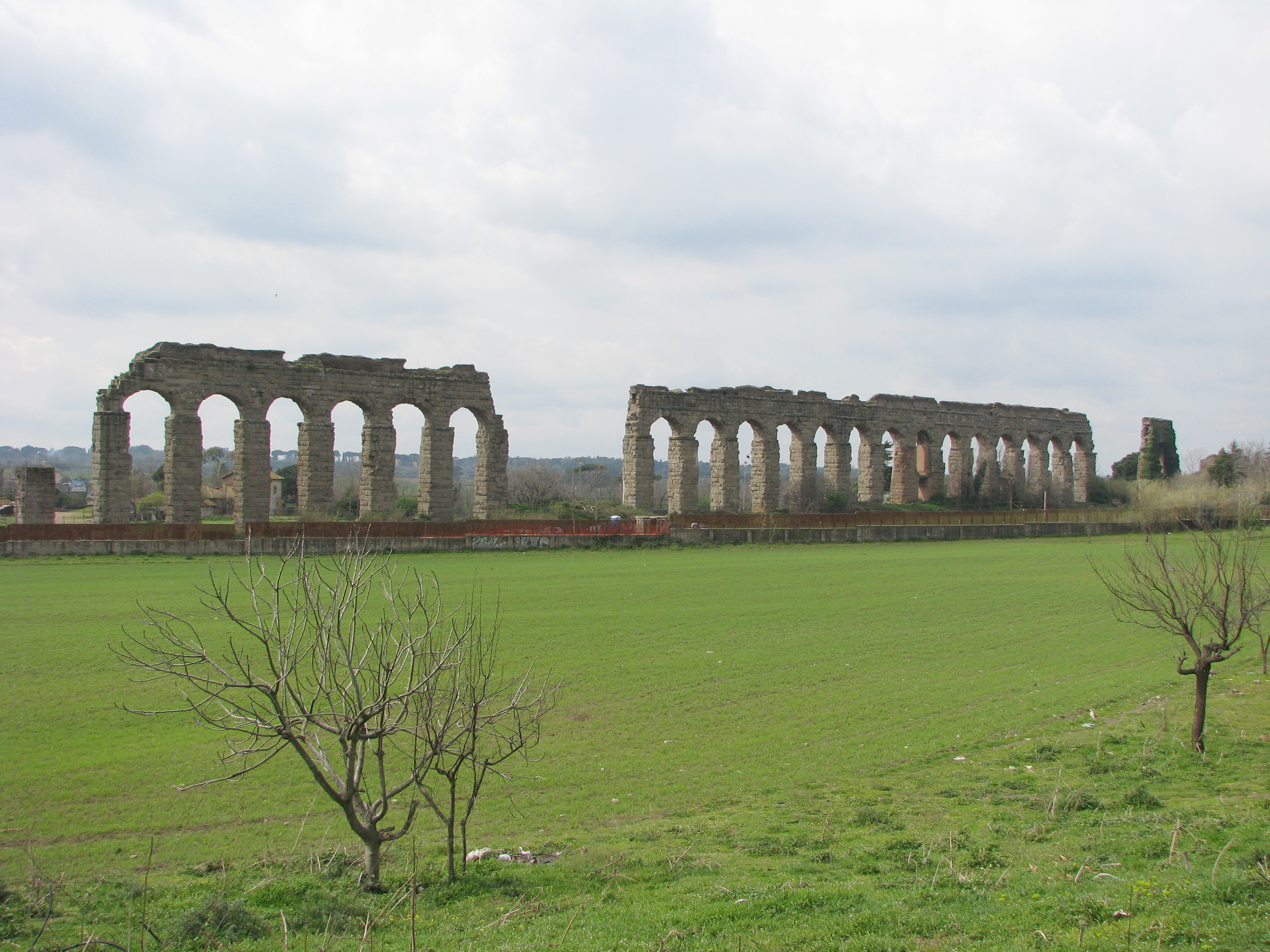

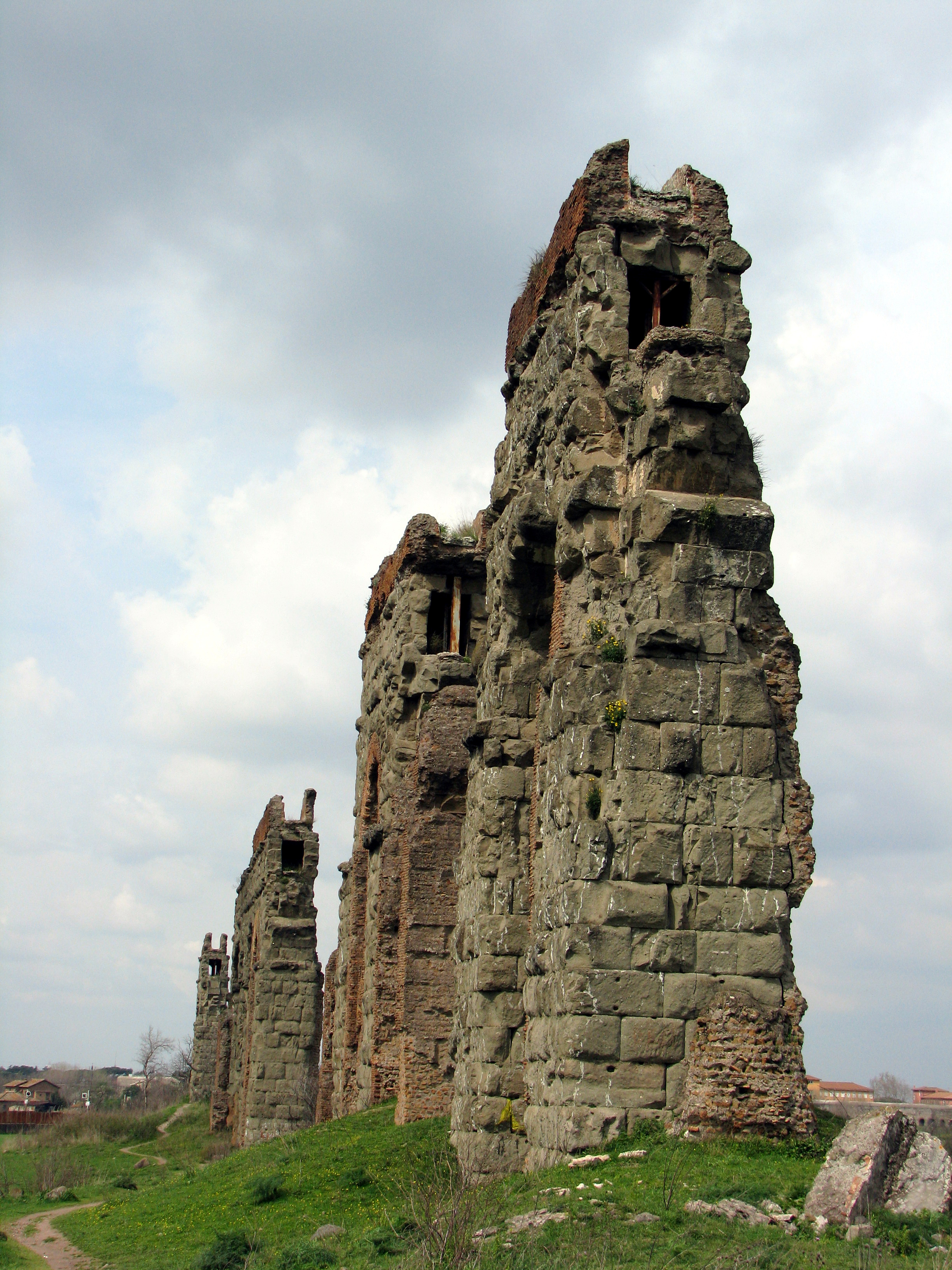

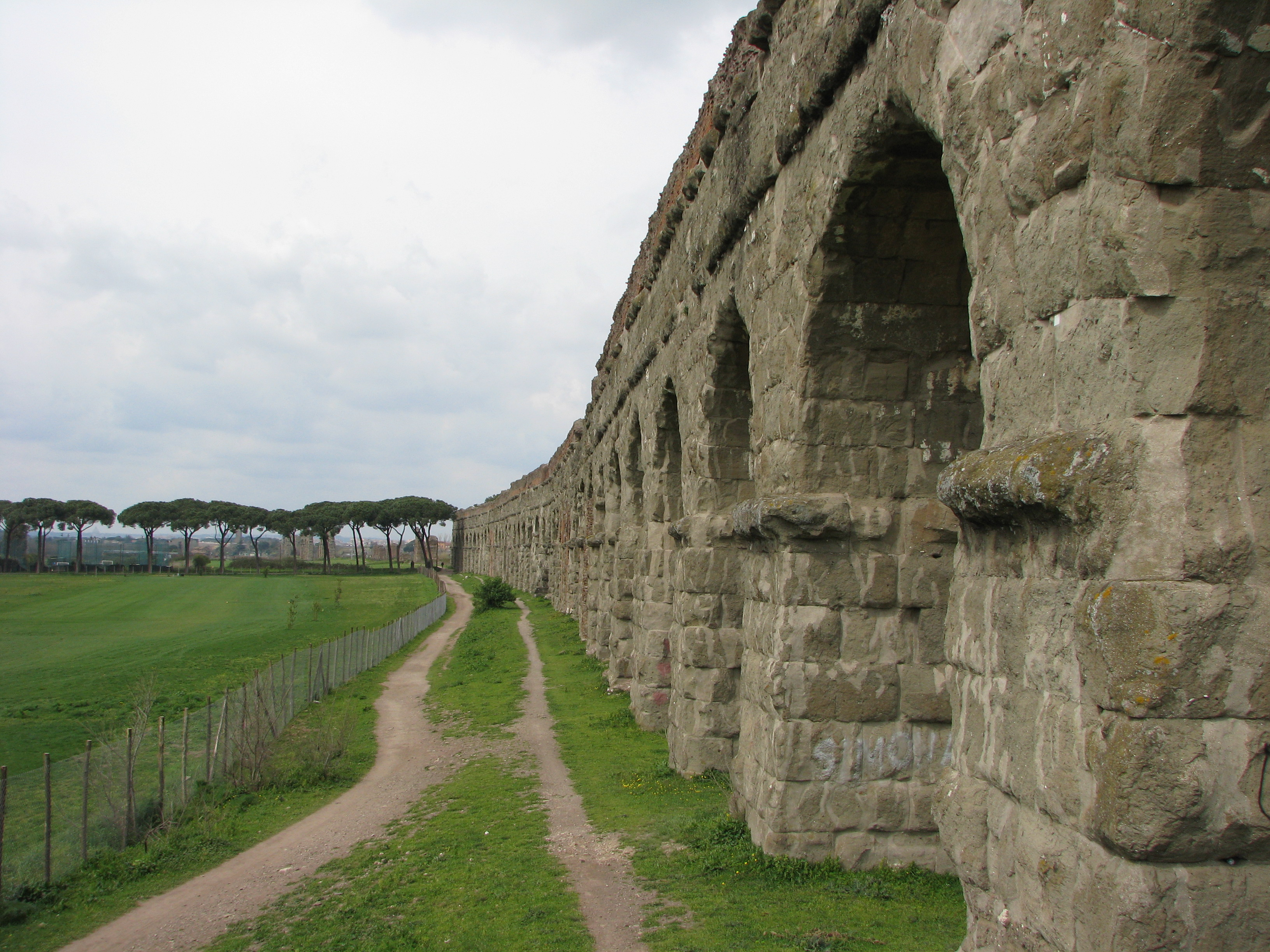

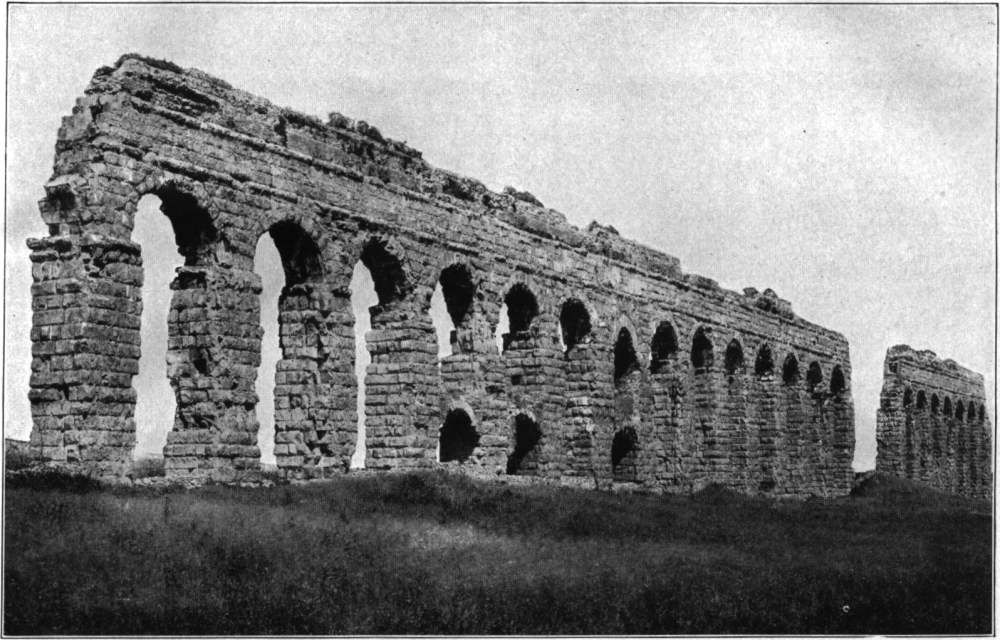

== See also ==
- Aqua Alexandrina – Roman aqueduct, a landmark of Rome, Italy
- List of aqueducts in the city of Rome
- List of aqueducts in the Roman Empire
- List of Roman aqueducts by date
- Ancient Roman engineering
- Ancient Roman technology

== Notes ==
Preceded by Aqua Anio Vetus	Landmarks of Rome; Aqua Claudia	Succeeded by Cloaca Maxima
