= List of aqueducts =

This is a list of aqueducts.

== Africa ==
=== Botswana ===
- North-South Carrier

=== Egypt ===
- Aqueduct of the Nile (historic)
- Bahr Yussef
- Fresh Water Canal
- Ibrahimiya Canal
- Mahmoudiyah Canal
- Sadat Canal (see also New Valley Project)
- Sweet Water Canal

=== Libya ===
- Great Man-Made River

=== Sudan ===
- Gezira Scheme

=== Tunisia ===
- Zaghouan Aqueduct

=== MOROCCO ===
- LEQUASS Aqueduct

== Asia ==
=== Sri Lanka ===
- Ella, Kandy

=== China ===
- Big Western Line (proposed)
- Irtysh–Karamay–Ürümqi Canal
- South-North Water Transfer Project (proposed)

=== India ===
- Indira Gandhi Canal
- Mahi Aqueduct
- Mathur Aqueduct
- Solani River Aqueduct
- Peddavagu Aqueduct

=== Israel ===
- National Water Carrier of Israel

=== Japan ===
- Nanzen-ji Temple, Kyoto

=== Jordan ===
- Gadara Aqueduct

=== Kazakhstan ===
- Irtysh–Karaganda Canal

=== Taiwan ===
- Chianan Canal

=== Turkmenistan ===
- Karakum Canal
- Main Turkmen Canal (unfinished)

== Australia and Oceania ==
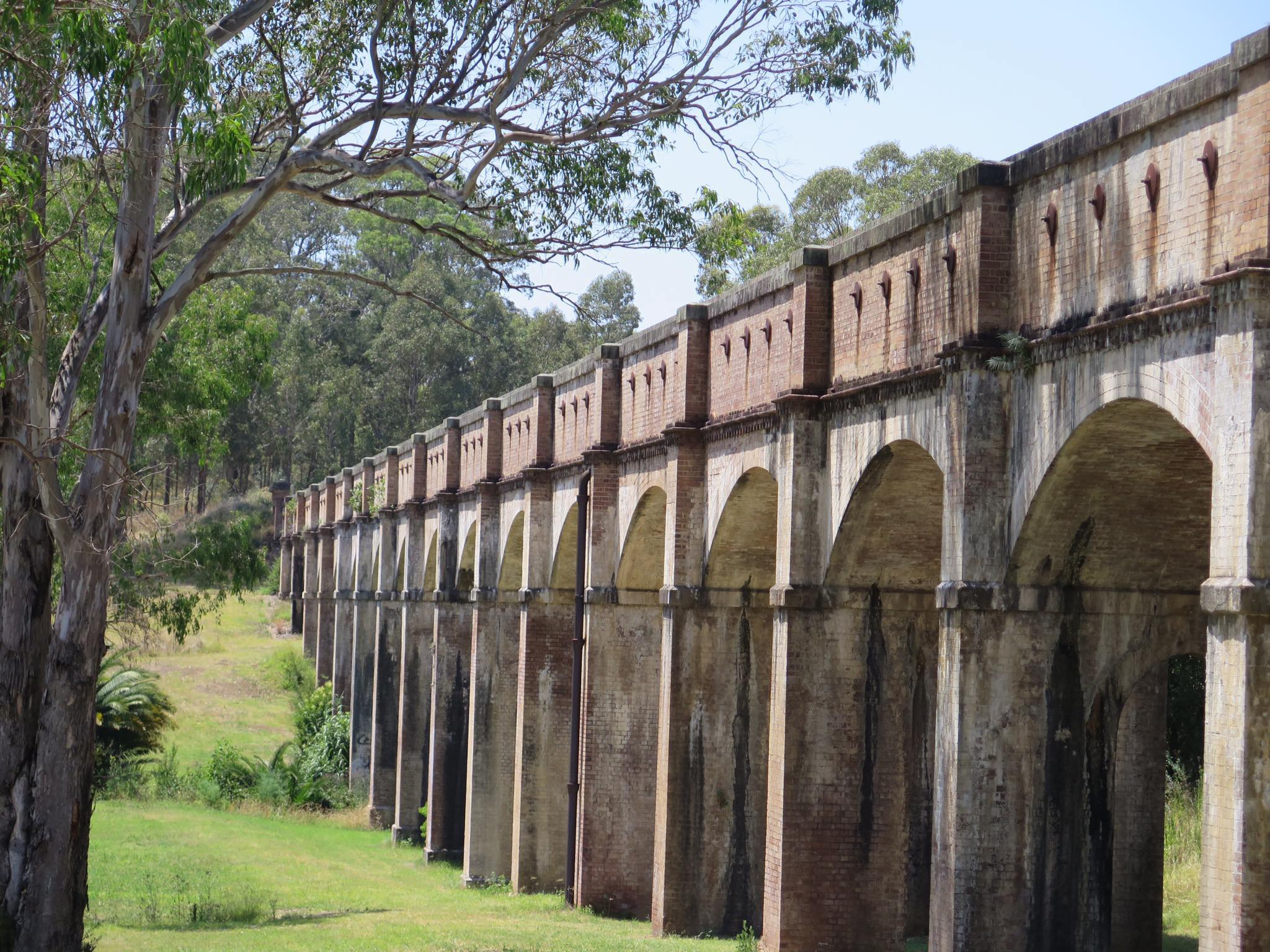
Boothtown Aqueduct, Western Sydney

=== Australia ===
- Barwon Sewer Aqueduct
- Boothtown Aqueduct
- Mount Evelyn Aqueduct (defunct)

=== New Zealand ===
The unique Tokaanu Tailrace Bridge, a combined road and water bridge crosses a power canal of the Tongariro Power Scheme in the North Island of New Zealand. State Highway 41 travels along the top of this bridge, with the Tokaanu Stream, an important trout spawning stream, running under the road surface.

== Europe ==
=== Austria ===
- Gaming aqueduct

=== Belgium ===
- Sart Canal Bridge

=== Croatia ===
- Aqueduct of Diocletian

=== Cyprus ===
- Kamares Aqueduct
- Nicosia aqueduct

=== France ===
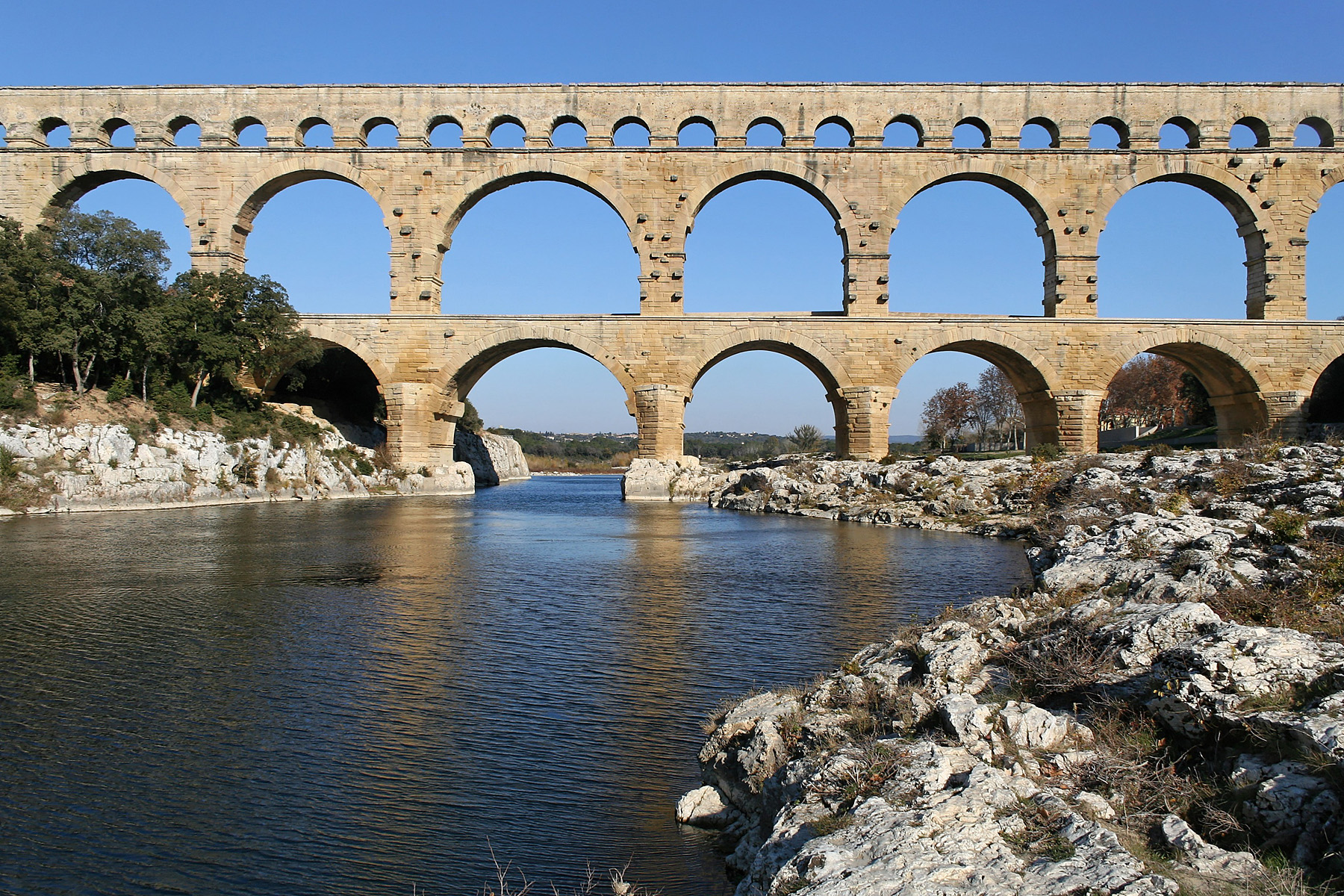
Pont du Gard seen from the river Gardon

- Aqueduc de Louveciennes
- Aqueduct of Luynes
- Aqueduct of the Gier
- Barbegal aqueduct and mills
- Pont du Gard
- Aqueduct of la Minette, Rennes
- Millau Viaduct, Southern France

=== Germany ===
- Eifel Aqueduct

=== Greece ===
- Aqueduct of Kavala
- Hadrian’s Aqueduct of Argos
- Roman and Medieval Aqueducts of Patras
- Roman Aqueduct of Chalkis
- Roman Aqueduct of Corinth
- Roman Aqueduct of Doliana
- Roman Aqueduct of Nikopolis
- Roman Aqueduct of Mytilene
- Roman Aqueducts of Athens
- Venetian Aqueduct of Chandax

=== Ireland ===
- Blundell Aqueduct
- Leinster Aqueduct
- Whitworth Aqueduct

=== Italy ===
- Aqua Augusta (Naples)
- Aqueduct of Vanvitelli

=== Malta ===
- Wignacourt Aqueduct
- Gozo Aqueduct

=== Montenegro ===
- Bar Aqueduct

=== Netherlands ===
==== Flevoland ====
- Naviduct

==== Friesland ====
- Aquaduct De Geeuw
- Ee Aquaduct
- Galamadammen Aquaduct
- Houkesloot Aquaduct
- Jeltesloot Aquaduct
- Leppa Akwadukt
- Prinses Margriettunnel
- Aquaduct Mid-Fryslân
- Aquaduct Langdeel

==== Gelderland ====
- Aquaduct Veluwemeer

==== North Holland ====
- Aquaduct Ringvaart Haarlemmermeer
- Floriaduct

==== Overijssel ====
- Aquaduct op het landgoed

==== South Holland ====
- Alphen-aquaduct
- Cortlandt-aquaduct
- Gaag-aquaduct
- Gouwe-aquaduct
- Vlietaquaduct
- Waterdrager
- Molenviergang (Aarlanderveen)

==== Utrecht ====
- Rien Nouwen Aquaduct

==== Zeeland ====
- Dampoort-aquaduct

=== North Macedonia ===
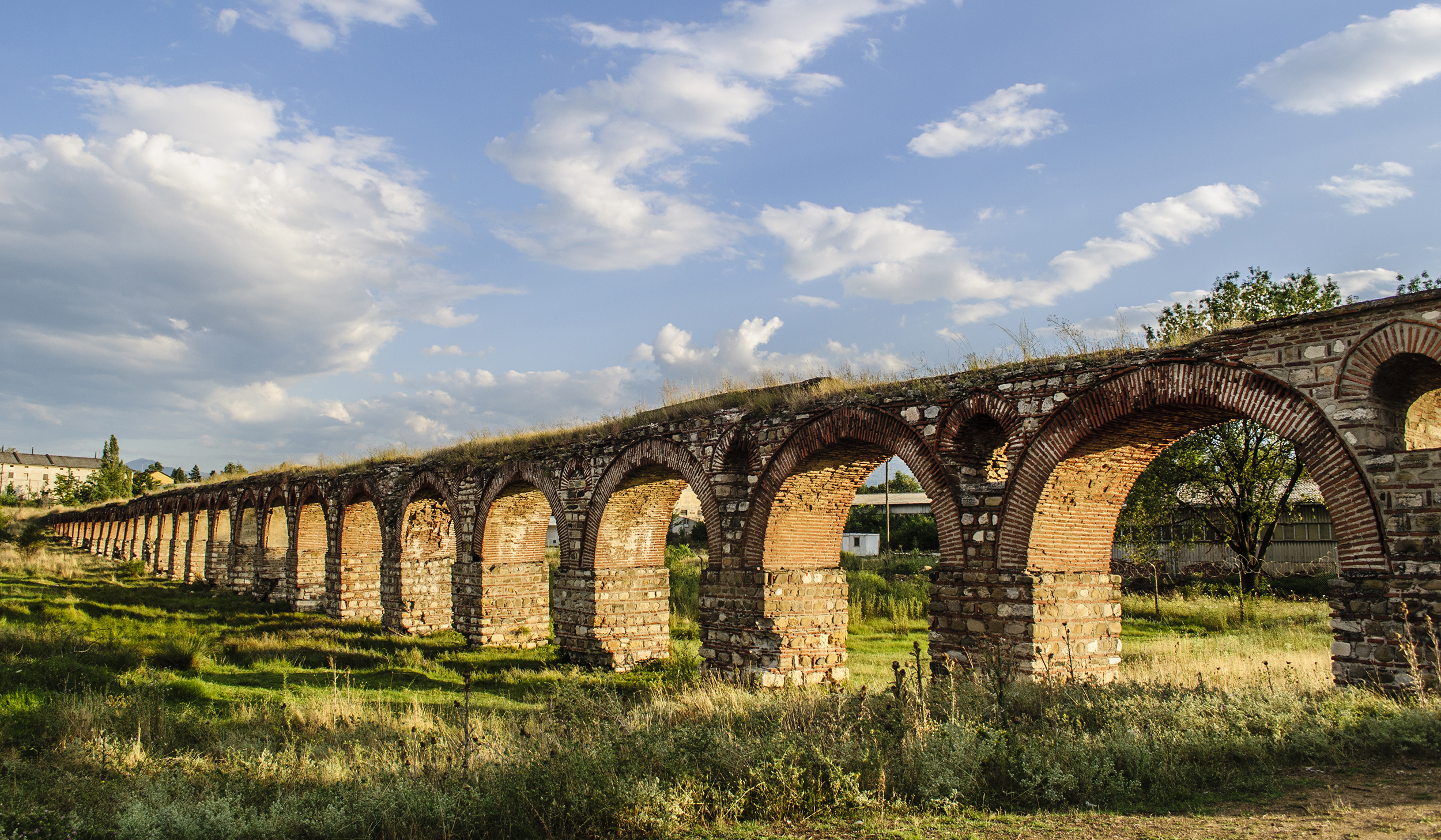
The Skopje Aqueduct

- Skopje Aqueduct

=== Portugal ===
- Águas Livres Aqueduct
- Amoreira Aqueduct
- Santa Clara Aqueduct

=== Russia ===
- Rostokino Aqueduct

=== Spain ===
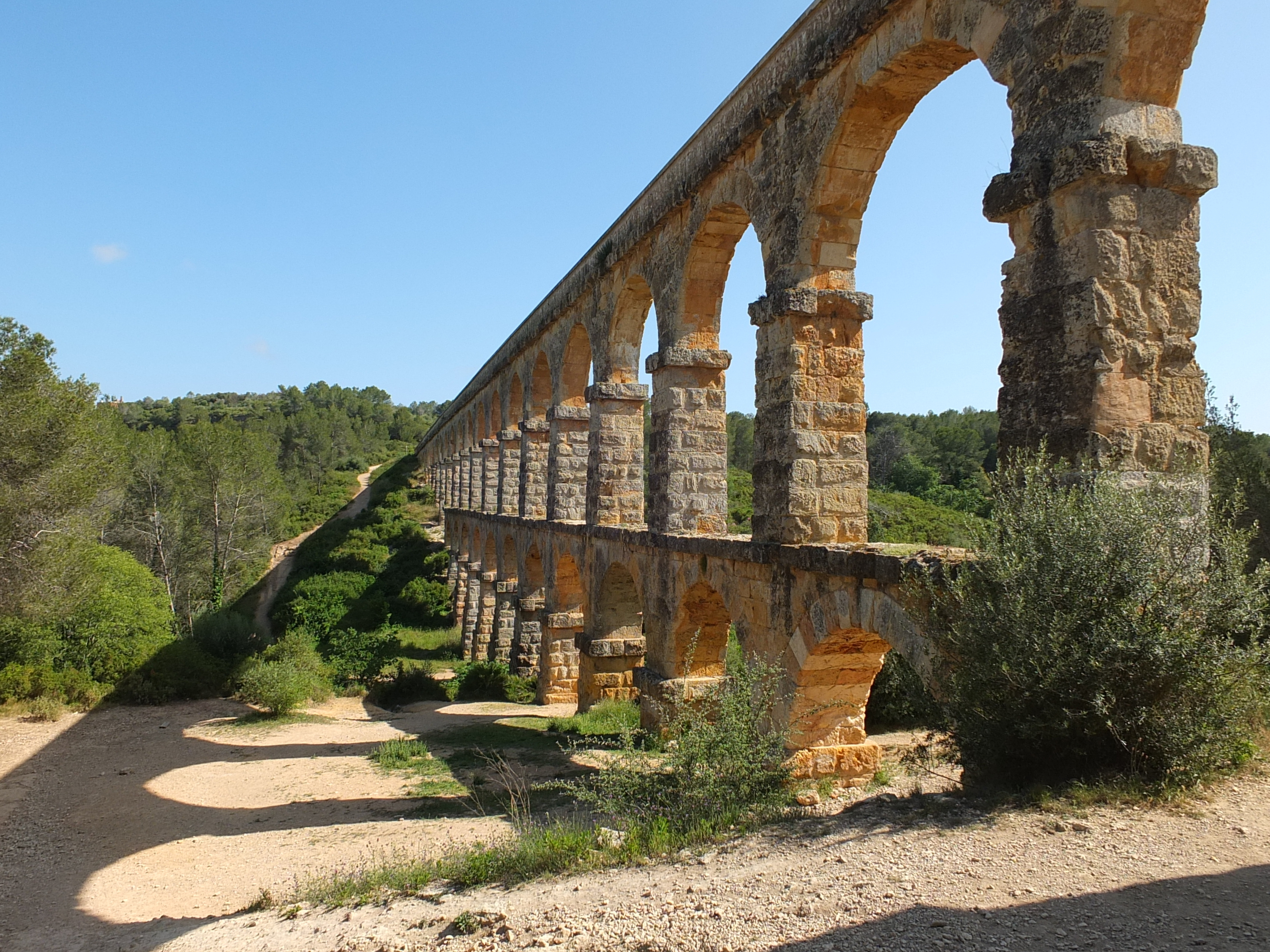
Les Ferreres Aqueduct

- Aqueduct of Albatana
- Aqueduct of Algeciras
- Aqueduct of Segovia
- Acueducto de los Milagros
- Les Ferreres Aqueduct
- Roman aqueducts of Toledo

=== Sweden ===
- Håverud Aqueduct

=== Turkey ===
- Aqueduct of Valens
- İncekaya Aqueduct
- Lamas Aqueduct
- Mağlova Aqueduct
- Olba Aqueduct

=== United Kingdom ===
- Devonport Leat
- Dowley Gap Aqueduct
- Drake's Leat
- Laleham Aqueduct
- New River Aqueduct
- Staines Reservoirs Aqueduct

== North America ==
=== Canada ===
- Brooks Aqueduct (defunct)
- Canal de l'Aqueduc
- Greater Winnipeg Water District Aqueduct
- Sooke Flowline (defunct)

=== United States ===
==== Arizona ====
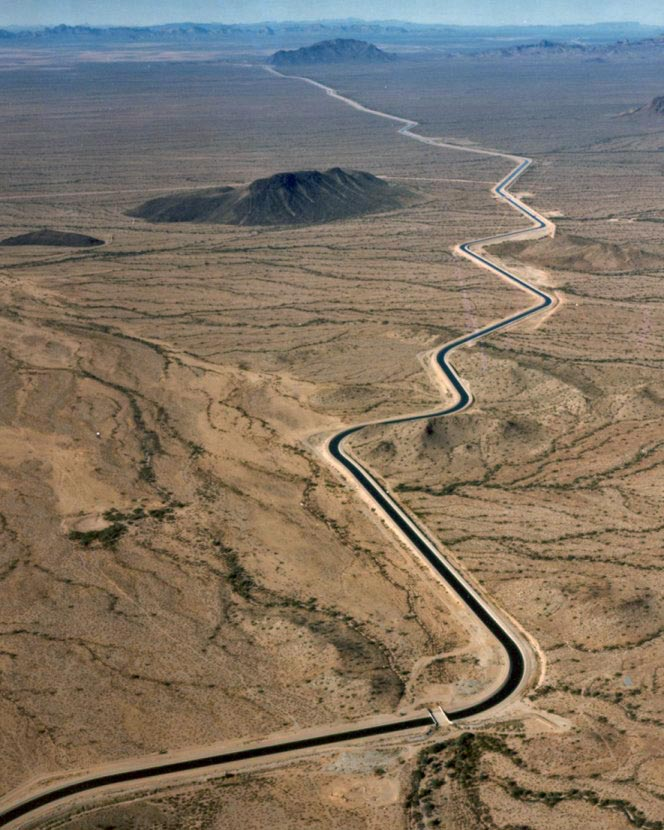
A canal of the Central Arizona Project

- Arizona Canal
- Central Arizona Project (Granite Reef Aqueduct)
- Consolidated Canal
- Gila Gravity Canal
- Grand Canal (Arizona)
- South Canal (Arizona)
- Tempe Canal
- Western Canal (Arizona)

==== California ====
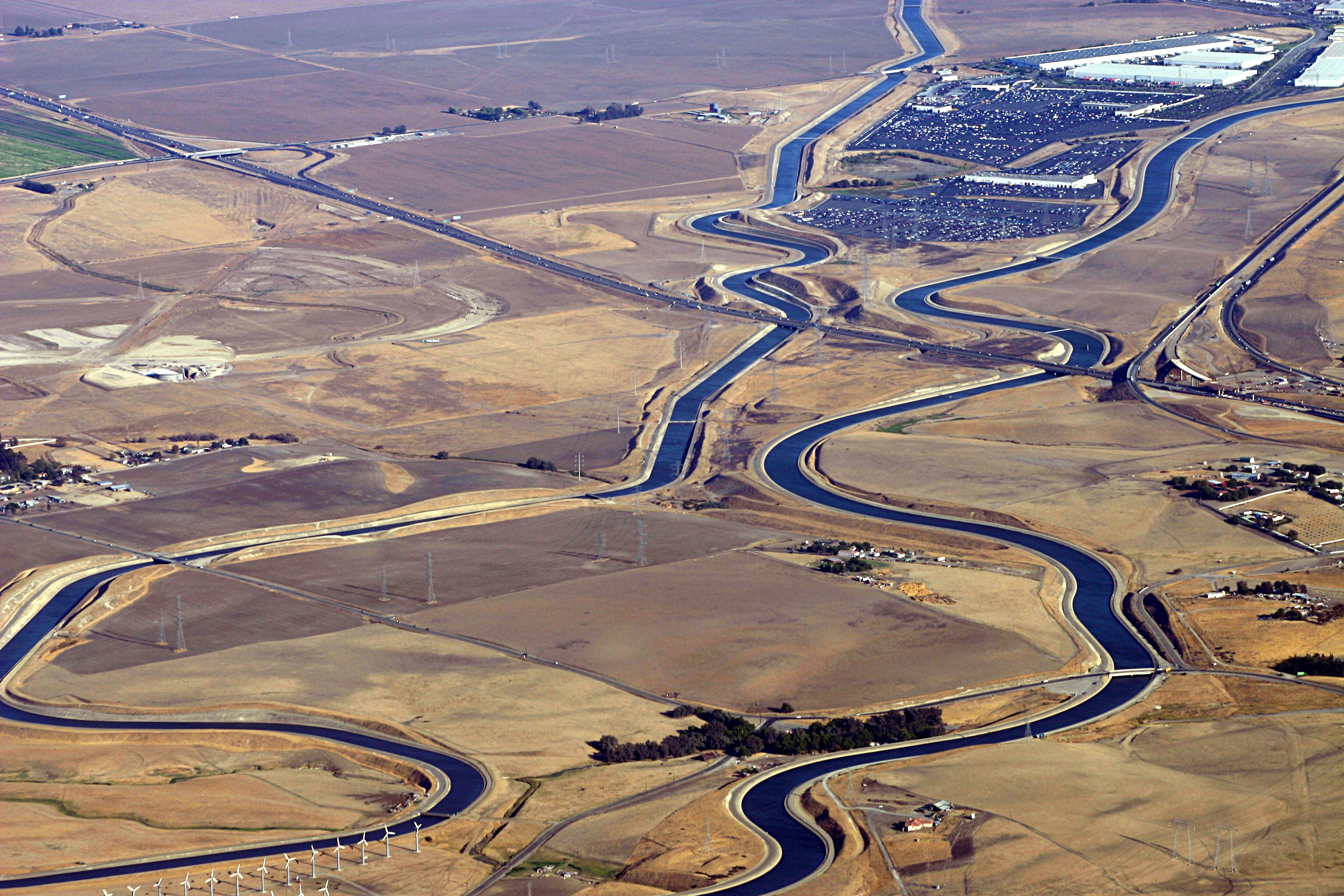
California Aqueduct and Delta-Mendota Canal

- All-American Canal
- California Aqueduct
- Coachella Canal
- Colorado River Aqueduct
- Corning Canal
- Delta-Mendota Canal
- Folsom South Canal
- Friant-Kern Canal
- Hetch Hetchy Aqueduct
- Los Angeles Aqueduct
- Madera Canal
- Mokelumne Aqueduct
- North Bay Aqueduct
- San Diego Aqueduct
  - La Mesa-Sweetwater Branch
- South Bay Aqueduct
- Tehama-Colusa Canal

==== Idaho ====
- Gooding Milner canal
- Twin Falls Main Canal

==== Indiana ====
- Indiana Central Canal
- Duck Creek Aquaduct, Metamora, Indiana

==== Massachusetts ====
- Chicopee Valley Aqueduct
- Cochituate Aqueduct (historic)
- Cosgrove Aqueduct
- MetroWest Water Supply Tunnel
- Quabbin Aqueduct
- Wild Cat Aqueduct
- Middlesex Canal
- Echo Bridge

==== New Mexico ====
- Azotea Tunnel
- Belen Canal
- East Side Canal
- Leasburg Canal
- Navajo Indian Irrigation Project
- Peralta Canal
- Rincon Valley Main Canal
- West Side Canal

==== New York ====
- Catskill Aqueduct
- Croton Aqueduct (historic)
- Delaware Aqueduct
- New Croton Aqueduct

==== Puerto Rico ====
- San Juan Waterworks (historic)

==== Texas ====
- American Canal
- Franklin Canal
- Mission San Juan Aqueduct
- Phantom Lake Canal
- Riverside Canal
- Tornillo Canal

==== Washington, D.C. ====
- Washington Aqueduct

==== Washington State ====
- Multiple aqueducts for the Columbia Basin Project

=== Mexico ===
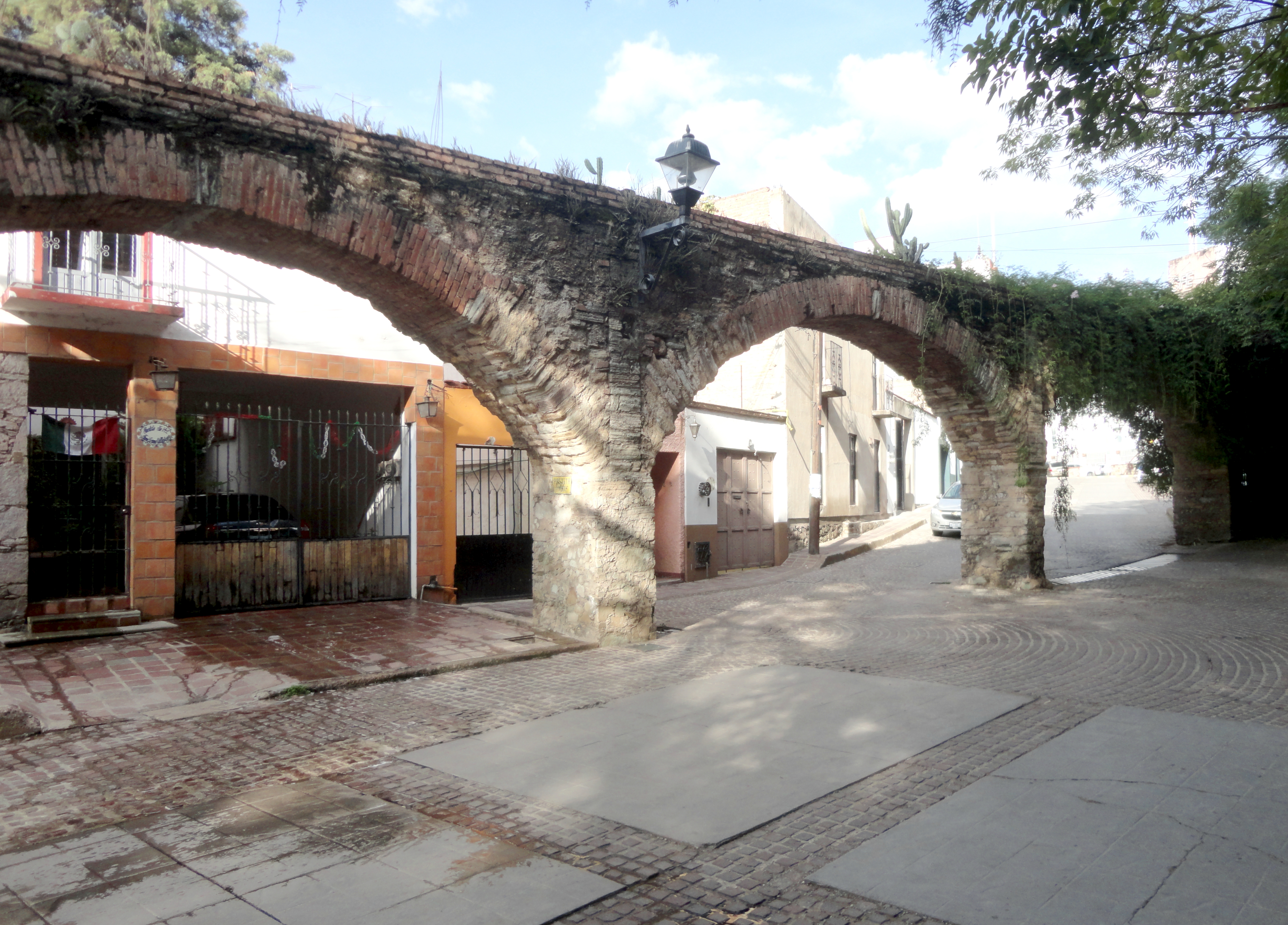
Pastita Aqueduct, Guanajuato City

- Alamo Canal (disused)
- Aqueduct of Padre Tembleque
- Chapultepec Aqueduct (ruins)
- Chihuahua Aqueduct
- Colorado River-Tijuana Aqueduct
- Morelia Aqueduct
- Querétaro Aqueduct
- Saltillo Aqueduct
- Tecoatl irrigation system (ruins)
- Tepotzotlán Aqueduct
- Zacatecas Aqueduct

== South America ==
=== Brazil ===
- Carioca Aqueduct

=== Colombia ===
- Aqueduct of Bogotá Savanna

=== Peru ===
- Puquios (historic, but still in use)
