= Entenza =

Entenza is a surname. Notable people with the surname include:

- Matt Entenza, Minnesota lawyer and politician
- John Entenza (1903–1984), pivotal figure in the growth of modernism in California
- Alonso Fajardo de Entenza (d. 1624, in the Philippines)
- Luisa de Entenza y Cascales Pacheco, Lady of Espinardo, daughter of don Alfonso de Entenza
- Alfonso de Entenza Pacheco, Lord of Espinardo

== See also ==
- Entença (disambiguation)
