= Luisa de Tenza, Lady of Espinardo =

Spanish noble

Luisa de Tenza, Lady of Espinardo (in full, Spanish: Doña Luisa de Tenza y Cascales Pacheco, señora de las villas de Espinardo, Ontur y del mayorazgo de Celdrán), was a Spanish noblewoman.

Luisa de Tenza was the daughter of Alonso de Tenza and his wife, Doña Aldonza de Cascales y Soto, a distant relative of Hernando de Soto. She was the Lady of Espinardo, Ontur, Albatana, and Mojón Blanco.

She married at Murcia to Admiral Don Luis Fajardo. They were the parents of Don Juan Fajardo de Tenza, 1st Marquess of Espinardo, and Don Alonso Fajardo de Entenza, Spanish Governor-General and Captain-General of the Islands of the Philippines, from 3 July 1618 to July 1624.

== Sources ==
- Hobbs, Nicolas (2007). "Grandes de España" (in Spanish).
- Instituto de Salazar y Castro. Elenco de Grandezas y Titulos Nobiliarios Españoles (in Spanish). periodic publication.

Spanish nobility
Preceded by Alonso de Tenza	Lord of Espinardo; 1605-1620	Succeeded by Alonso Fajardo de Entenza
