= Alonso de Tenza, Lord of Espinardo =

Alonso de Tenza Pacheco, Lord of Espinardo, (in full, Spanish: Don Alonso de Tenza Pacheco, señor de las villas de Espinardo, Ontur y del mayorazgo de Celdrán), was a Spanish nobleman.

Alonso de Tenza was Lord (owner) of the towns of Espinardo, Ontur, Albatana and Mojón Blanco. He married Doña Aldonza de Cascales y Soto, a distant relative of Hernando de Soto and had a daughter Luisa, who married Admiral Don Luis Fajardo.

== Sources ==
- Hobbs, Nicolas (2007). "Grandes de España" (in Spanish). Archived from the original on 25 October 2008.
- Instituto de Salazar y Castro. Elenco de Grandezas y Titulos Nobiliarios Españoles (in Spanish). periodic publication.

Spanish nobility
Preceded by	Lord of Espinardo; 1585-1605	Succeeded by Luisa de Tenza
