= Aqueduct of Albatana =

- Acueducto de Albatana (Spanish)
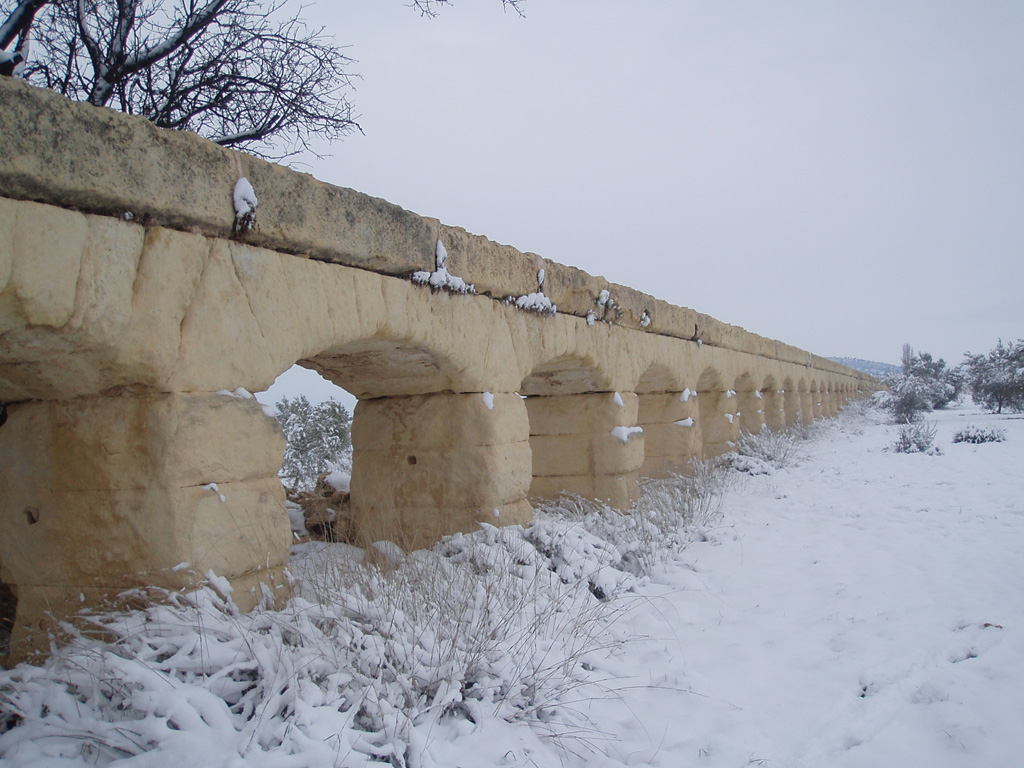

- Location within Spain
- 38.583562°N 1.54623°W
- Location: Albatana, Spain

Spanish Cultural Heritage
- Official name: Acueducto de Albatana
- Type: Non-movable
- Criteria: Monument
- Designated: 1990
- Reference no.: RI-51-0007004

The Aqueduct of Albatana (Spanish: Acueducto de Albatana) is an aqueduct located in Albatana, Spain. It was declared Bien de Interés Cultural in 1990.

== See also ==
- List of aqueducts
