= Entença =

Entença may refer to:

- Entença (town), village in the pre-Pyrenees
- House of Entença, ancient dynasty of the Crown of Aragon and Catalonia
- Carrer d'Entença, Barcelona, street in Barcelona
- Entença (Barcelona Metro), a station on line 5 of the Barcelona Metro

== See also ==
- Entenza (disambiguation)
