= Roman and Medieval Aqueducts of Patras =

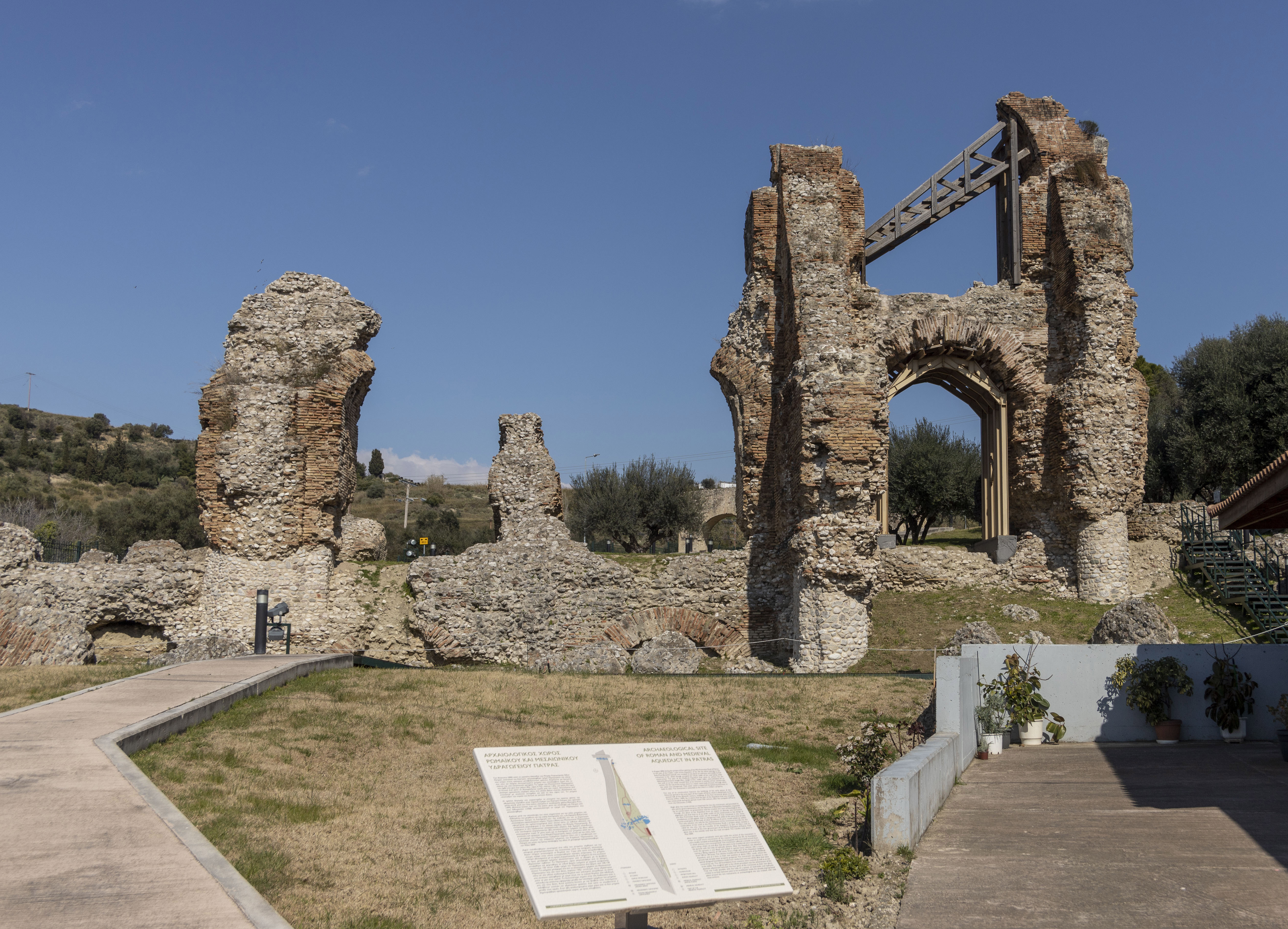
- Ruins of the Roman aqueduct

General information
- Type: Roman aqueduct
- Architectural style: Roman
- Town or city: Patras
- Country: Greece
- Coordinates: 38°14′48″N 21°45′11″E
- Groundbreaking: Probably reign of Hadrian (117-138 AD)

The Roman and Medieval Aqueducts of Patras (Greek: Ρωμαϊκό και Μεσαιωνικό Υδραγωγείο Πάτρας) is an archaeological site in the city of Patras, West Greece.

The Roman aqueduct is a major work of the Roman period in Greece and a vital part in the water supply of Roman-era Patras. Today parts of the aqueduct are visible around the short Patras' bypass road and the neighborhoods of Aroi and Asyrmatos. The aqueduct measured 6.5 km (4.04 mi) from the springs of Romanos to the city acropolis, today part of Patras Castle. For the greater part of this distance, the water passed through an underground channel, passing over valleys and gorges on carefully constructed archways, parts of which still stand.

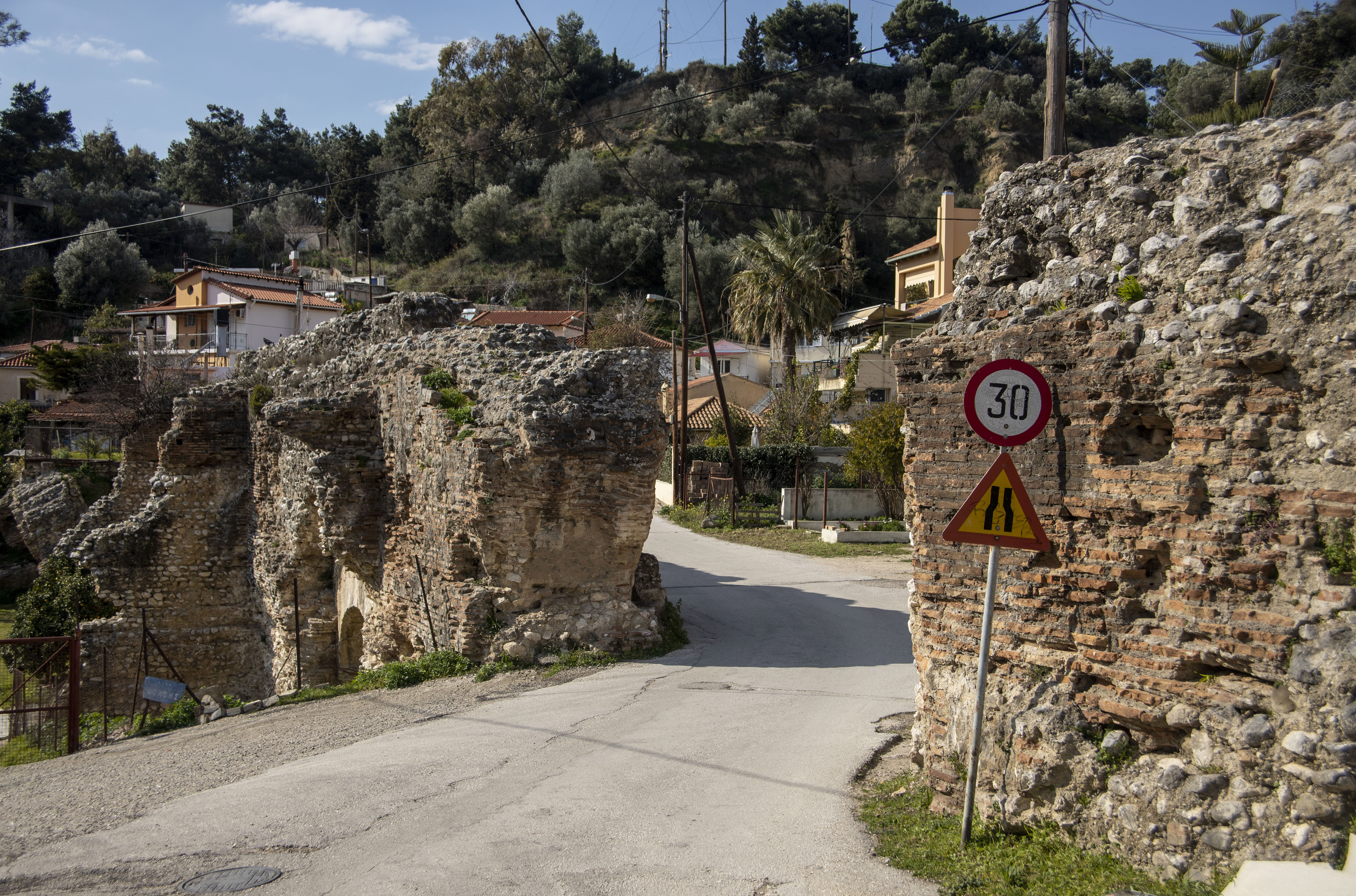
View of the Roman aqueduct in Asyrmatos neighborhood.

== History ==
The Romans rendered Patras a Roman colony in 31 BC. The city was an important gateway between Greece and Italy, and the Roman architecture dominated the city completely. Roman emperors and city benefactors funded many public buildings and projects in the city with the aqueduct being one of them; a necessary infrastructure for the water supply of a populous city like Patras. Most probably during Hadrian's reign (117–138) the Romans built a large water cistern at the springs of Romanos in Mount Panachaiko, in the form of an artificial dam, part of which is incorporated today in the modern day water-tank. Several large pieces of that wall still remain in the region. According to an inscription found, Nymphs were worshipped at the location of the Romanos springs. The aqueduct measured 6.5 km in length from the water cistern to the city's acropolis. For the greater part of this distance, the water passed through an underground pipe, passing over valleys and gorges on constructed archways, parts of which still remain today. According to foreign visitors of the city, the aqueduct was in a good condition still carrying water until the 17th century when the city incorporated a water pipe supply system, rendering its use obsolete.

== The monument today ==
The construction of Patras' short bypass road was heavily delayed for more than 10 years due to the original planned path crossing the course of the Roman aqueduct. Furthermore, in 2006 an additional medieval aqueduct of the Ottoman period (15th-16th century) was discovered just a few hundred meters away from the Roman aqueduct. In order for the road works to continue, it was decided in 2009 to cut and remove parts of the medieval aqueduct and transfer and exhibit them in the same place with the ruins of the Roman one. In September 2018 the mini ring road opened to the public, along with a small archaeological park called Roman and Medieval Aqueducts of Patras along its side where people can visit the unified aqueducts. Parts of both aqueducts still remain located in private properties, with the Roman one passing through houses' yards in the local neighbourhood of Asyrmatos.

== Image gallery ==
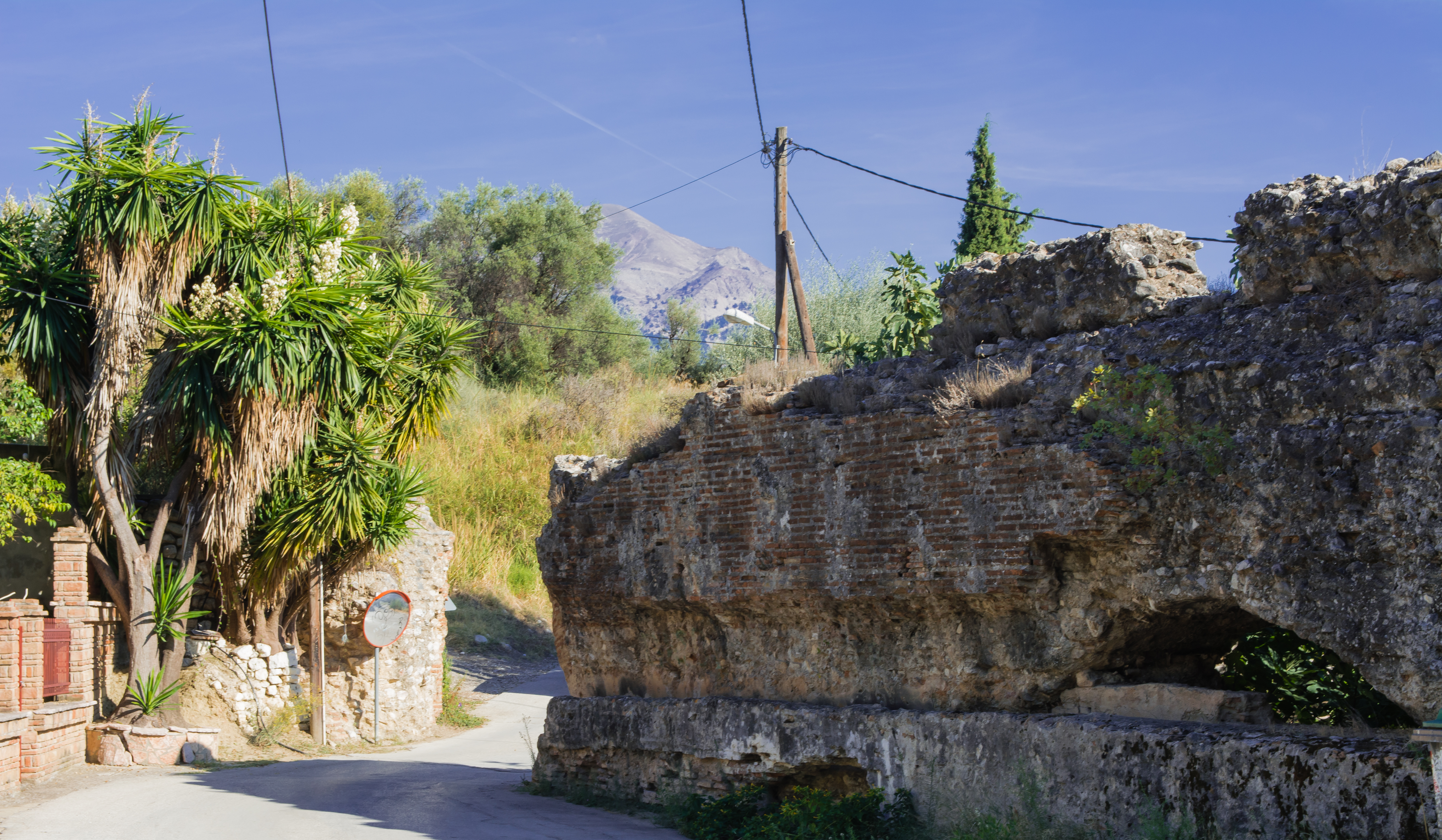
View of the Roman aqueduct in Asyrmatos neighborhood.

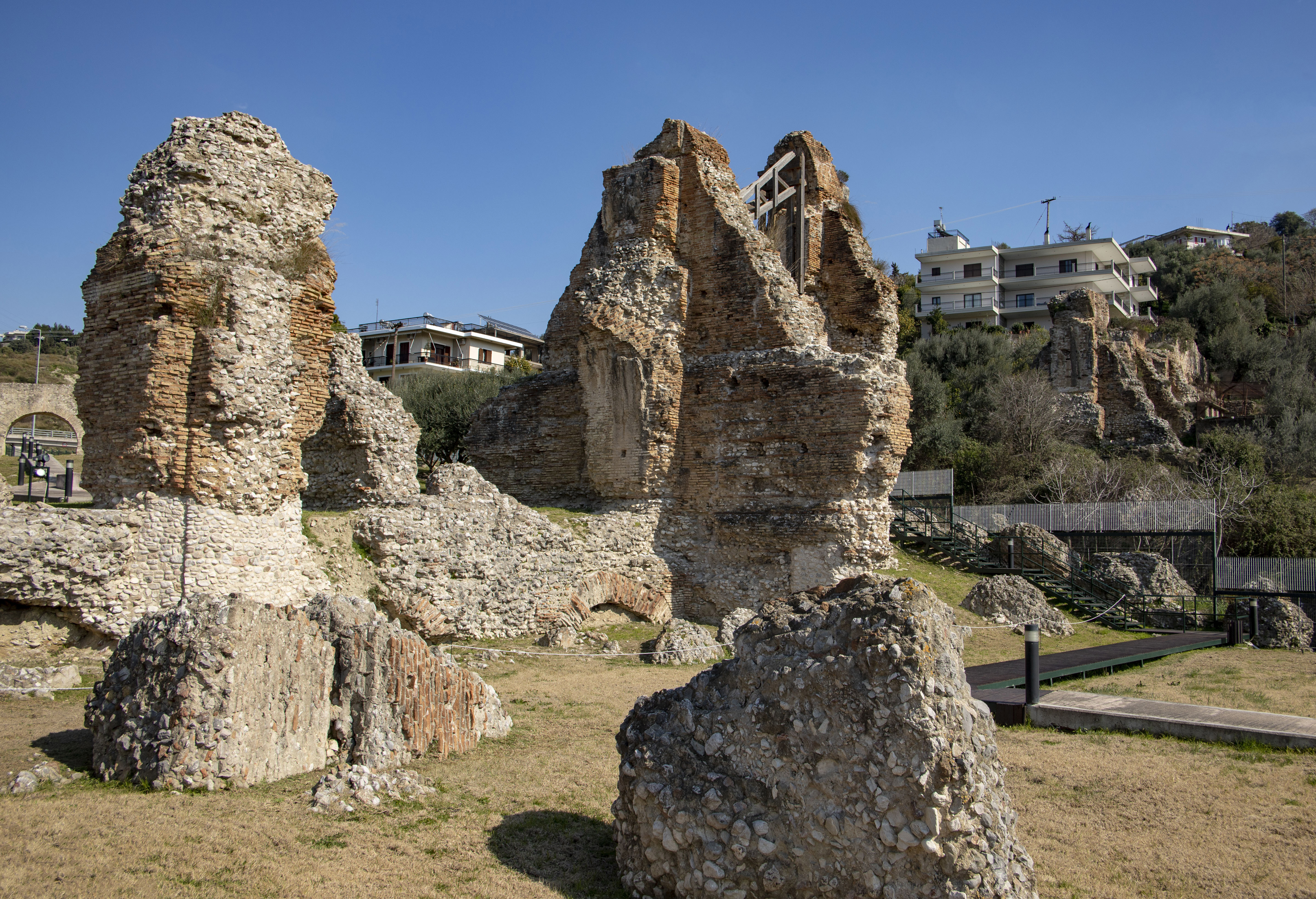
Ruins of the Roman aqueduct in the park.

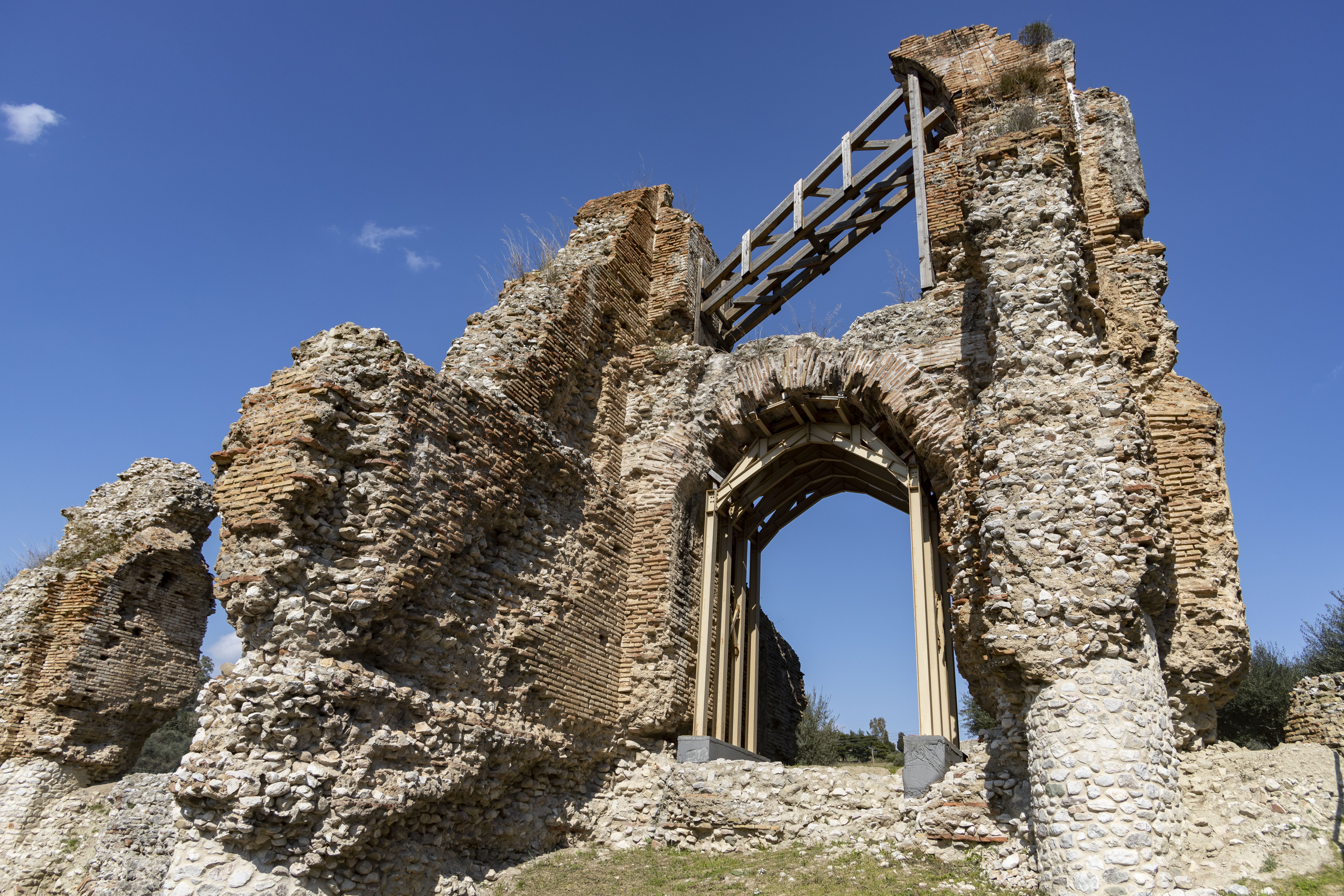
The remaining arch of the Roman aqueduct.

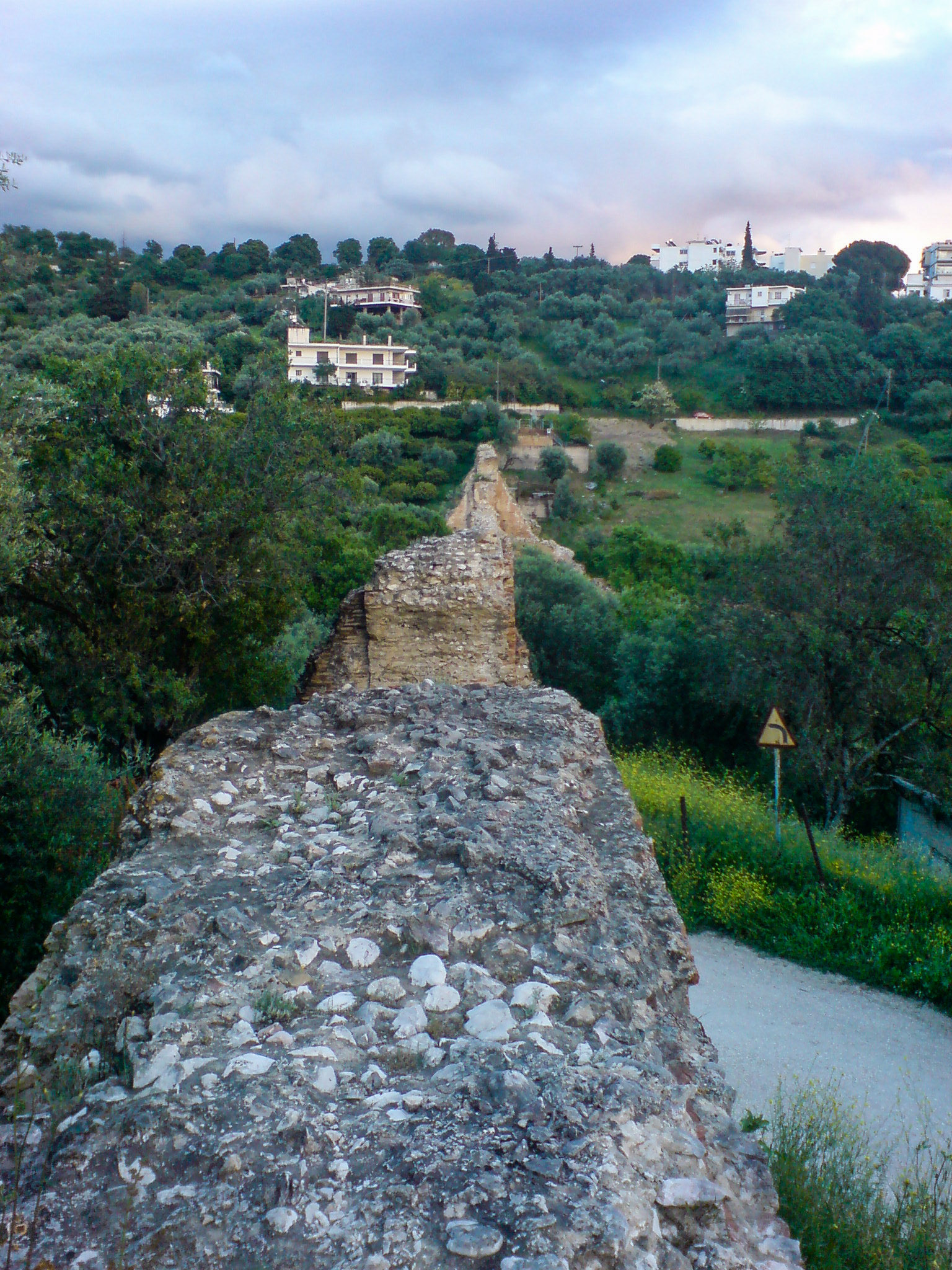
Path of the Roman aqueduct before the road construction.

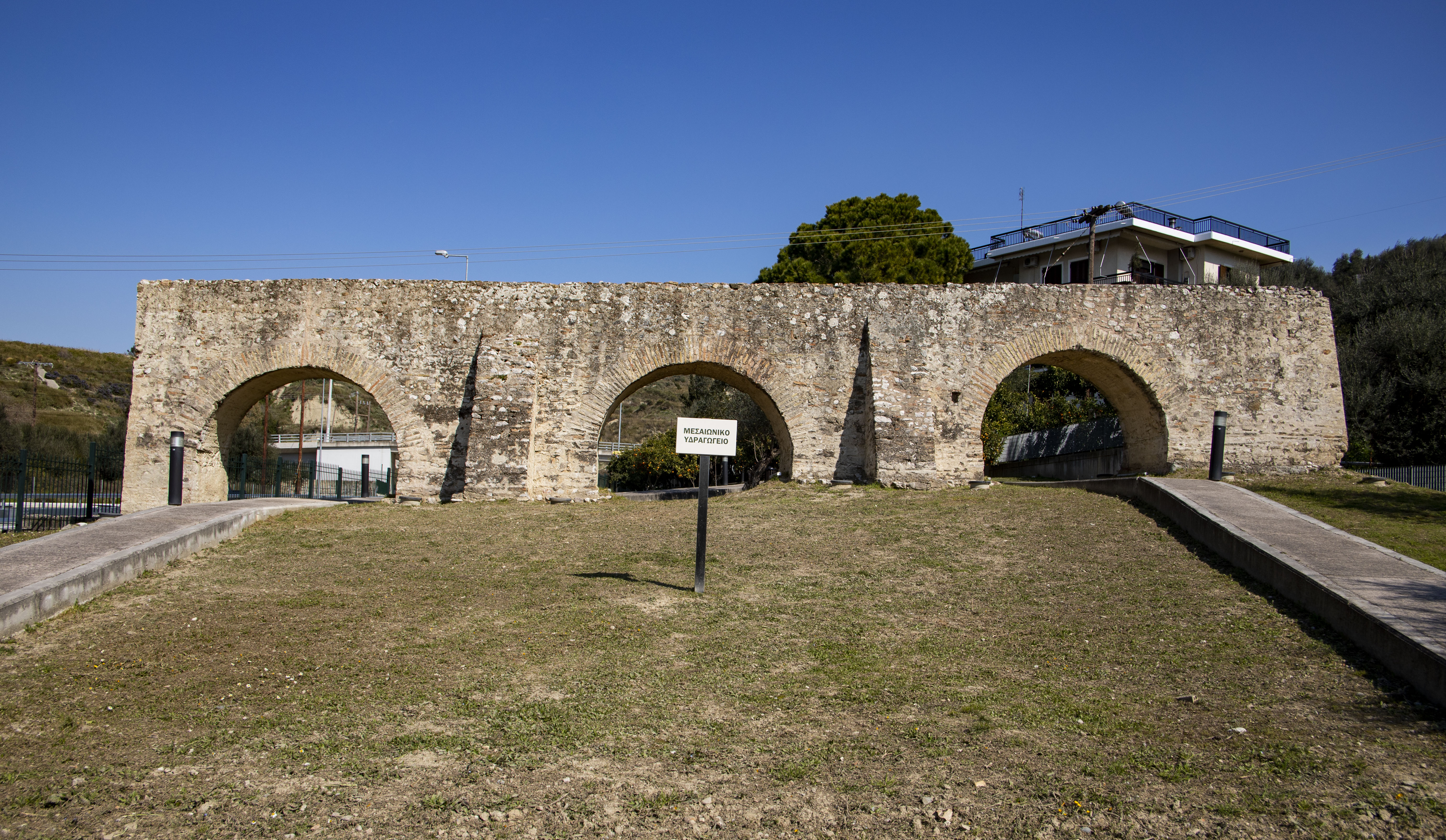
The medieval aqueduct in the park.

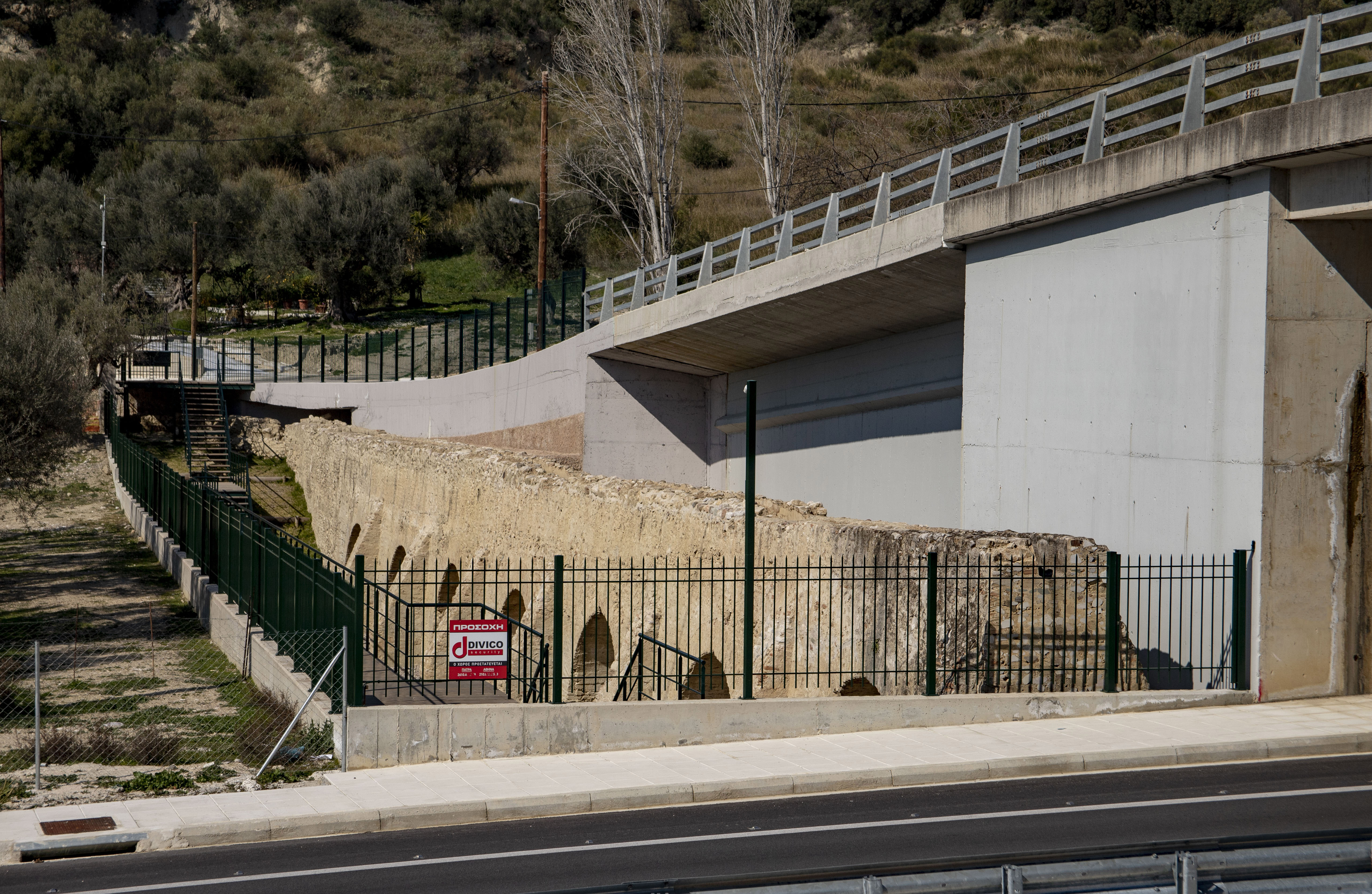
Part of the medieval aqueduct in situ.

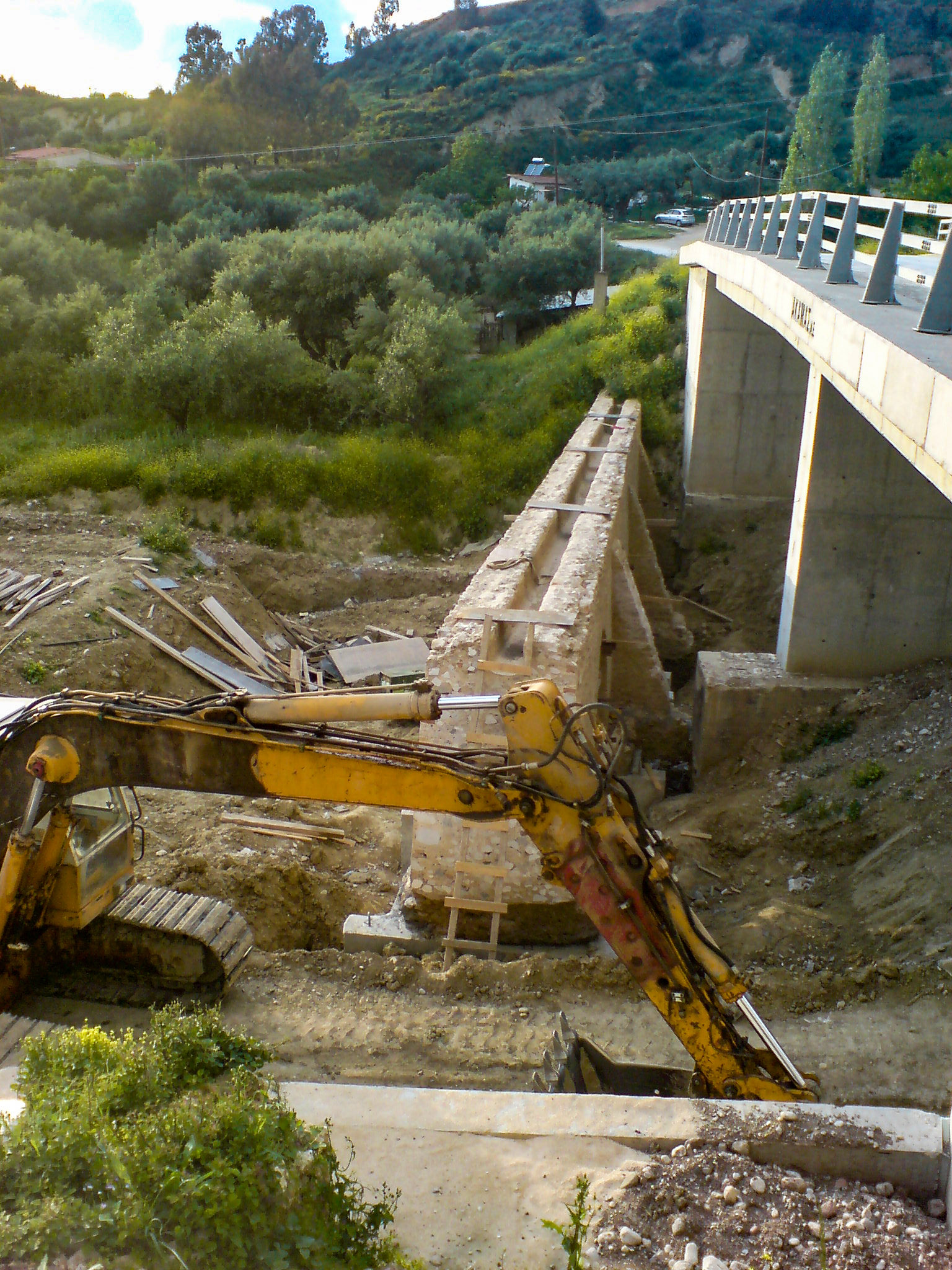
Cutting works and partial transportation of the medieval aqueduct in 2009.
