= Aqueduct of Algeciras =

Aqueduct of Algeciras Aqüeducte de les Ferreres
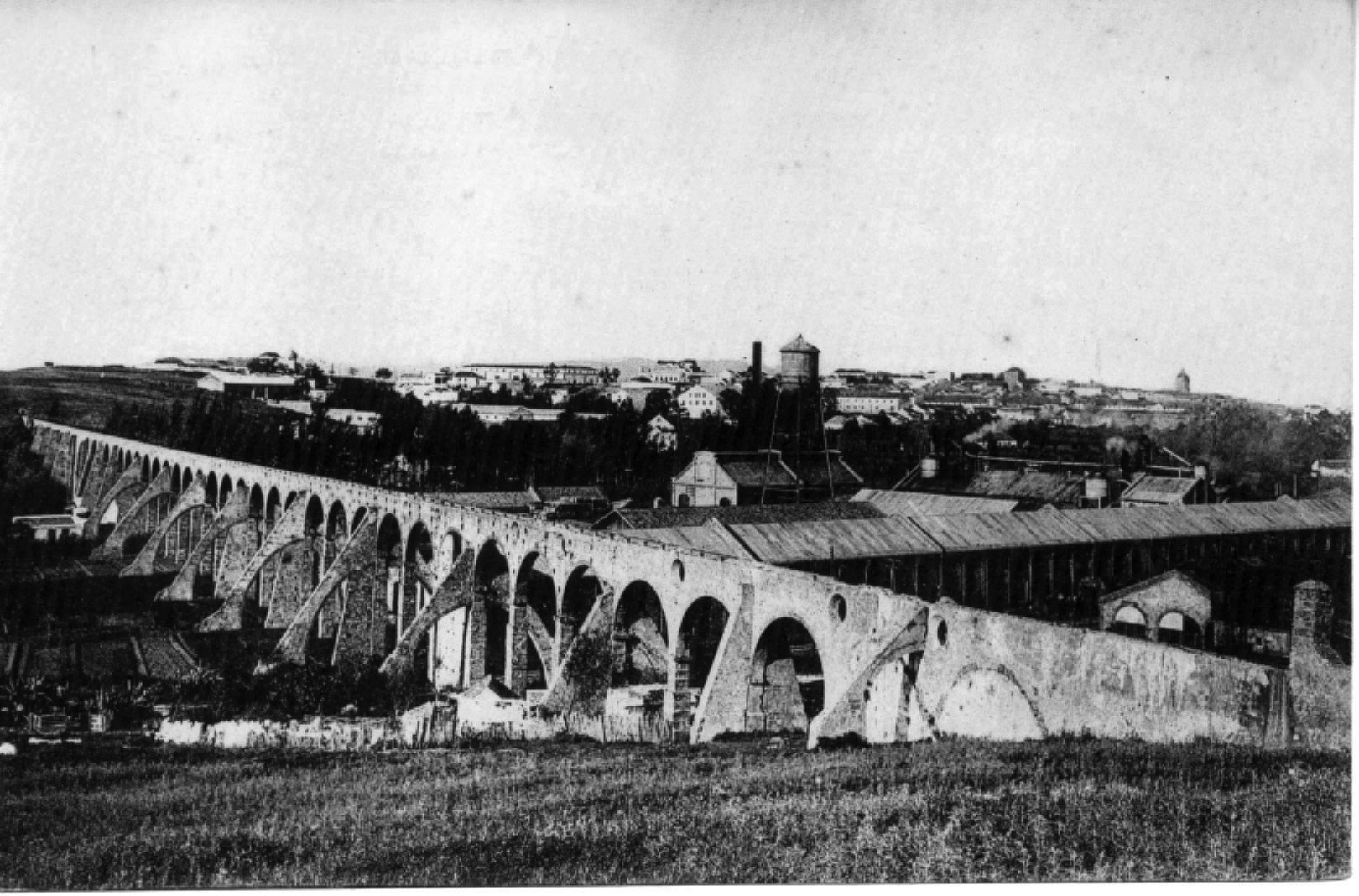
- Old photograph of the aqueduct.
- Coordinates: 36°07′03″N 5°28′24″W
- Carries: Aqueduct to Algeciras
- Locale: Algeciras, Spain

History
- Construction start: 1777
- Construction end: 1783

The Aqueduct of Algeciras (Spanish: Acueducto de Algeciras) is one of the most important buildings in Algeciras, Spain. Numerous textbooks, dictionaries and guidebooks cite this building as Arabic or Roman, but it was built in the eighteenth century.

== Description ==
The image of the city from the hills nearby, with arches in the foreground and Gibraltar in the background, was one of the most common postcards of the city, during the eighteenth and nineteenth centuries. To provide water to the city, the aqueduct began construction in 1777, completed in 1783. It had two sections, the farthest located in the suburb of El Cobre and precisely known as Los Arcos del Cobre, and a section nearest the neighborhood of La Bajadilla, now almost disappeared due to the large number of buildings that have been attached. It currently passes through the neighborhood of La Bajadilla.

The architect for the project was Pablo Casaus under the supervision of master plumber Florindo who had just completed a similar construction in Puerto Real. It has a series of arches of stone and brick with buttresses.

It is described as "a beautiful aqueduct" in 1911 when it was the water supply to the city. Algeciras was at the time largely dependent on the invalids who were attracted to the town by the pleasant winter climate.

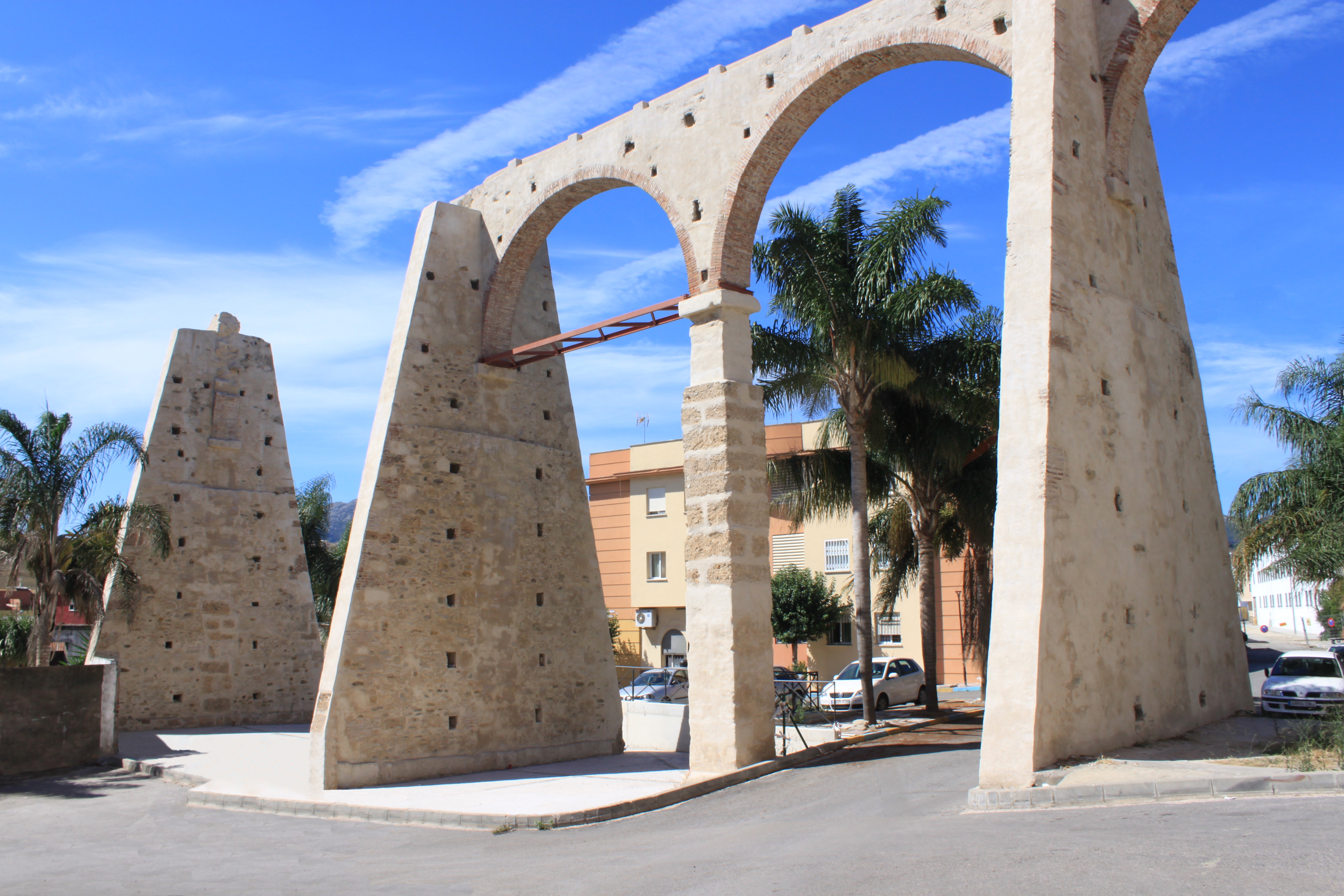
Arches of la Bajadilla.

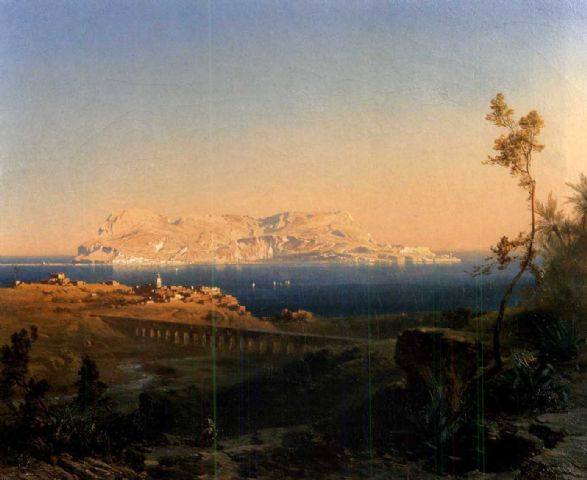
Gibraltar and Algeciras in 1864 by Fritz Bamberger

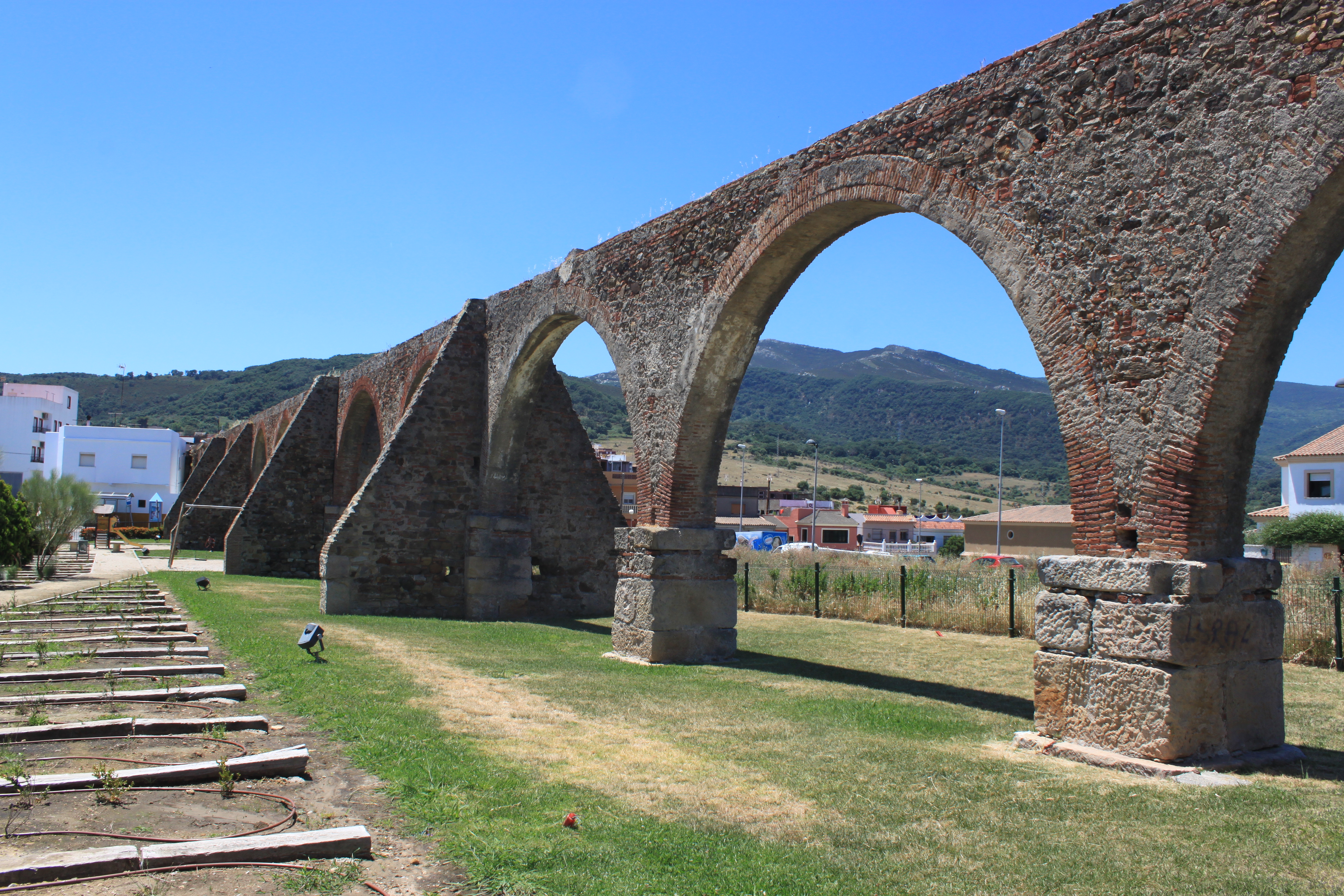
Arches of El Cobre

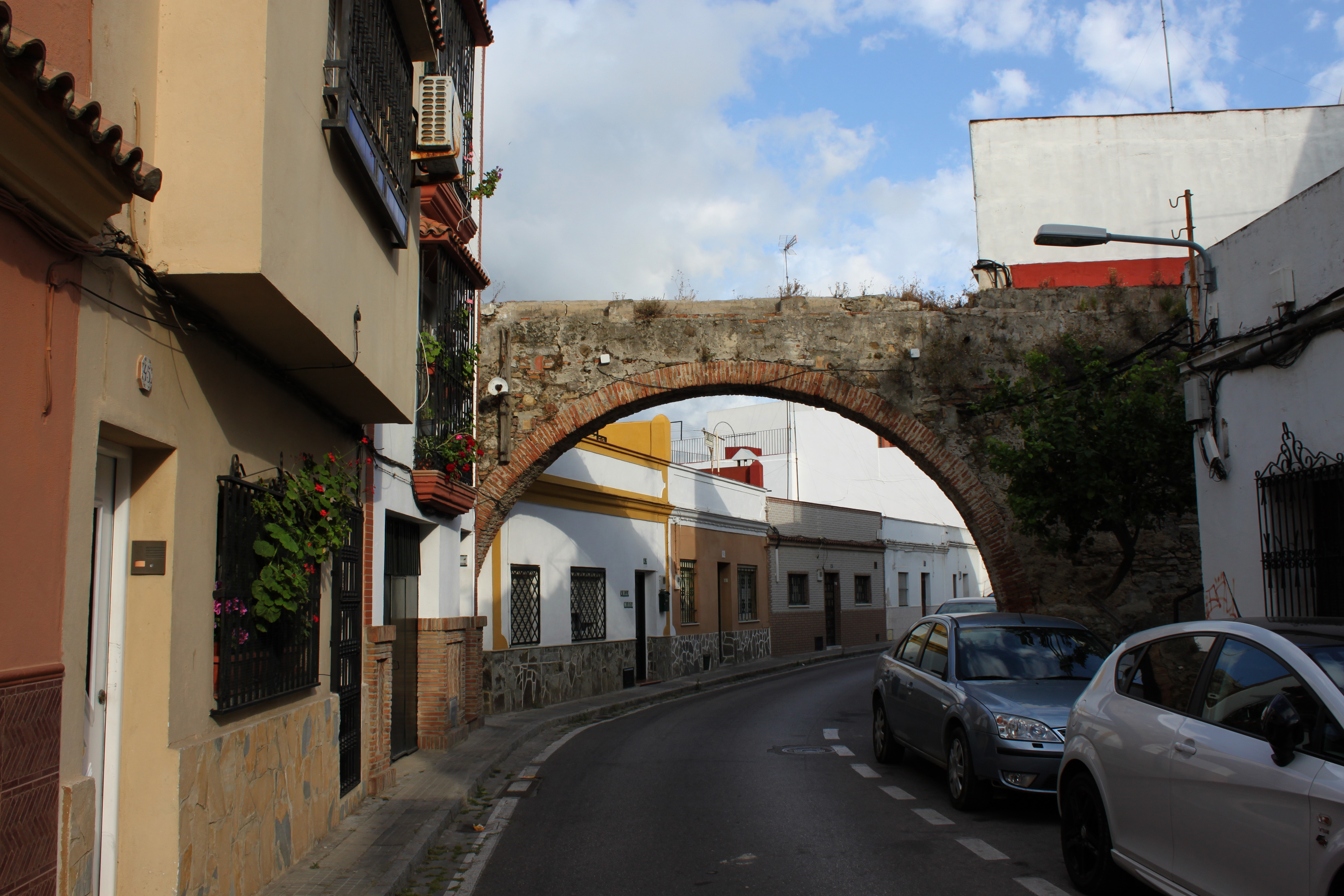
Arcade of the aqueduct in the calle San Vicente de Paul street.
