= Tecoatl =

Prehistoric stone canal in Mexico

A tecoatl (plural tecoatles) is a stone canal making up part of an extensive ancient aqueduct network in the Tehuacán Valley in the state of Puebla in Mexico. The word tecoatl translates to "stone snake" in the Aztec language Nahuatl, but the canal system is far older than the Aztecs. The first segments of the system were laid down approximately 2500 years ago.

Archaeological investigation of the tecoatl system began in the late 1960s, and further studies revealed that the tecoatles make up the longest prehistoric irrigation system in the New World. At one point 1200 kilometers of stone canals provided water to 330 km² of cultivated land in the Tehuacán Valley.

== Development ==
The tecoatles started out as simple channels dug in the earth and banked with small levees. They were carefully planned, sloping from high ground to low on a tortuous course that sloped less than two degrees at all times. The canal meandered amongst the fields, providing water from uphill mineral springs to crop fields during Southern Mexico's long dry season, which can last longer than six months. Without irrigation, agriculture is not possible even in the fertile hills and plains of the region.

The Tehuacán Valley is rich with mineral springs, and these water sources were eagerly tapped for farming by early residents of the area. The water in these springs is high in dissolved calcium carbonate in the form of calcite. As the water ran through the canals, calcite was slowly but steadily deposited on their walls, forming a hard, stony layer. Through concentration and evaporation calcite crystallized on the earthen surface of the canals, forming a leakproof shell of travertine. The travertine coating grew in thickness at a rate of about one centimeter per year.

At this rate, the canals began to grow in height. As each canal became shallower due to the travertine accumulation in its bed, water overflowing its levees deposited more travertine along the sides, building up the walls and effectively containing itself. When water did overflow and wash down the sides of the canal, it evaporated and deposited minerals along the base. Eventually, what was once a ditch in the soil became a tall stone aqueduct with a very wide base. The largest were five meters high and 30 meters wide, with water still flowing efficiently through the channel along the top. The farmers probably helped shape the canal, removing travertine buildup as needed, but for the most part each canal became a large winding calcareous aqueduct on its own, and earning it the appellation "stone snake".

== Use ==
Nearby aqueducts were built to channel river water as well, but these did not become tecoatles, because the water they bore was much lower in dissolved minerals than the water from the springs. The tecoatles are essentially fossilized structures. As the travertine crystallized on the walls of the tecoatles, it trapped biological material, such as small plants and algaes, as well as pollen from the crop plants grown alongside the water system. This material yields information about the composition of the water, the flow rate in the aqueducts, and the wild and cultivated flora of the area. The farmers grew maize, tomatoes, and peppers, and probably used wild cattails for a variety of purposes. Also, biological material trapped in the stone can be used for radiocarbon dating of the canals; the first ones were dug as early as 800 BC, and water ran through them as recently as the sixteenth century AD.

== See also ==
- Agriculture in Mesoamerica
- Irrigation canals
- Aqueducts in Mexico
