= İncekaya Aqueduct =

İncekaya Aqueduct İncekaya Su kemeri
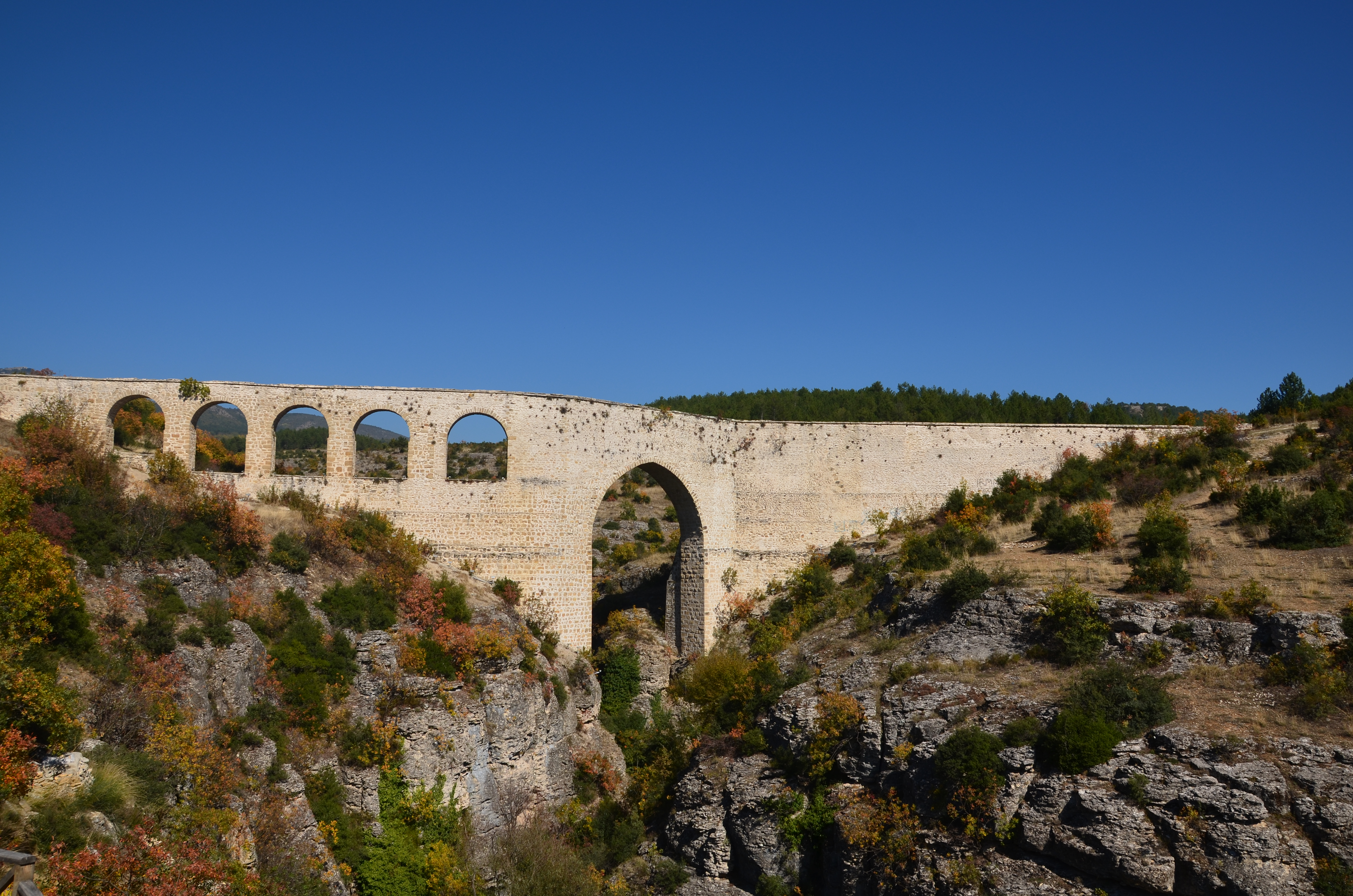
- İncakaya Aqueduct
- Coordinates: 41°16′53″N 32°41′05″E.
- Crosses: Tokatlı Canyon
- Locale: Safranbolu, Karabük Province, Turkey

Characteristics
- Material: Natural stone
- Total length: 110 m (360 ft)
- Width: 1.10–2.20 m (3 ft 7 in – 7 ft 3 in)
- Height: 60 m (200 ft)
- No. of spans: 1 + 5

History
- Construction end: 18th century

İncekaya Aqueduct (Turkish: İncekaya Su Kemeri) is an 18th-century aqueduct in Karabük Province, Turkey.

The aqueduct is to the north of Safranbolu ilçe (district) It is over Tokatlı Canyon. The altitude of the aqueduct with respect to sea level is about 600 m (2,000 ft). The aqueduct was commissioned by Safranbolulu Izzet Mehmet Pasha, a citizen of Safranbolu and a grand vizier of the Ottoman Empire between 1794–1798. The structure was used to supply water to Safranbolu.

The building material of the aqueduct is rubble stone. There are six arches; one main arch and five auxiliary arches. Its length is 116 m (381 ft) and its maximum height over the canyon is 60 m (200 ft). The width of the aqueduct varies between 1.10–2.20 m (3 ft 7 in – 7 ft 3 in).
