= Ontur =

Coordinates: 38°38′N 1°29′W

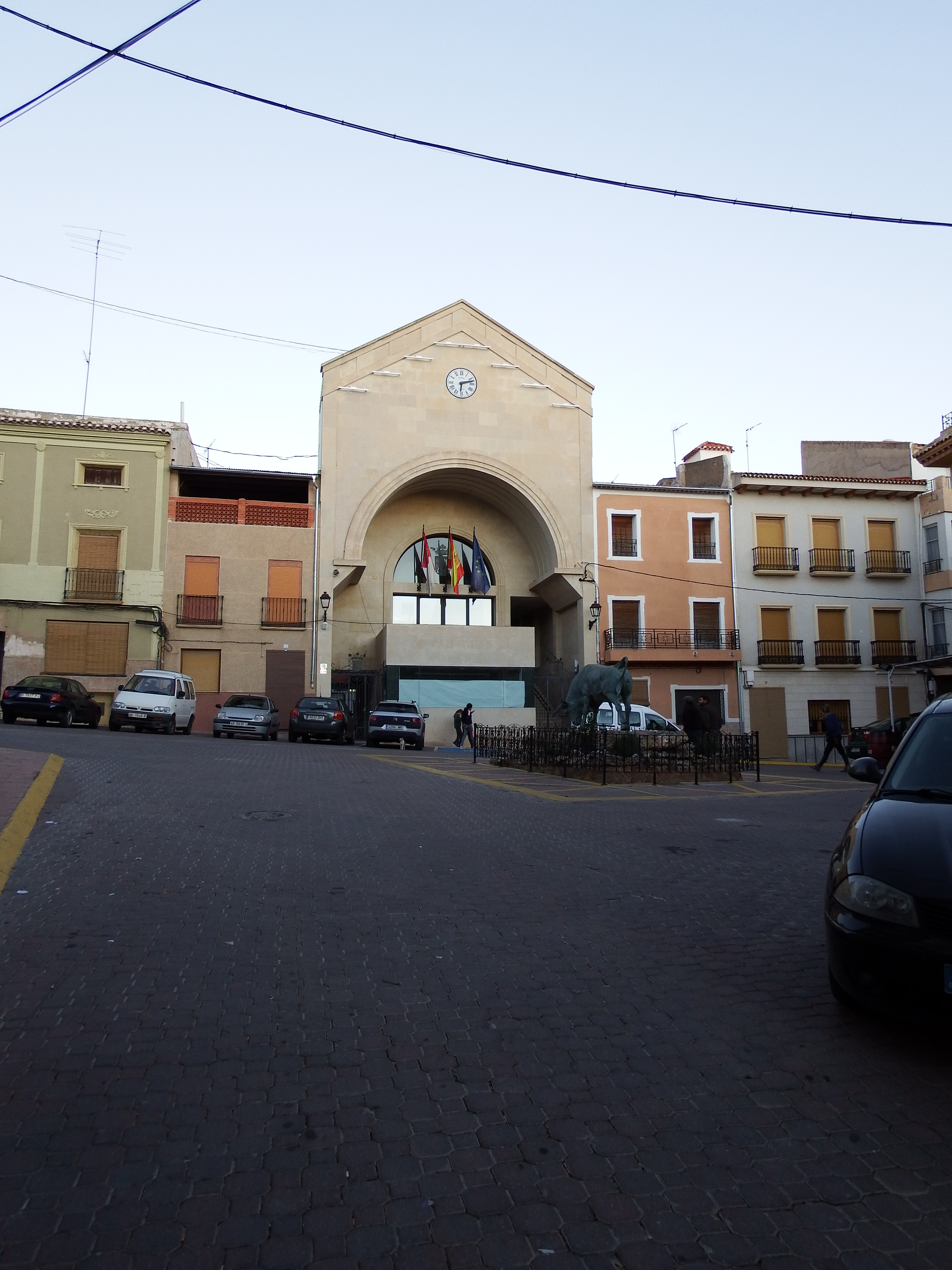
Town hall of Ontur

Ontur is a township of the province Albacete in Spain, located about 73 kilometers from the capital of the province, Albacete. In the year 2005 it had about 2,421 inhabitants. This township is famous for the Roman dolls discovered there.

== Roman dolls ==
Ivory dolls belonging to Roman girls were found in a child's grave in the necropolis of the "Ontur's Eras." Four ivory dolls and an amber doll were found. The discovery was exceptional for the large numbers of examples found and the unusual amber doll. It is estimated that their owner played with them in the 3rd or 4th century AD. The dolls can be seen in Albacete's Archaeological Museum.

== Ontur Airfield ==
Ontur Airfield is located at the foot of the Sierra del Madroño, where one can find the mountain of the same name, the tallest in the region at 1051 meters above mean [sea level]. The Regional Air Sports Centre is situated two kilometers from the town. It is a civil airfield owned by the town, and has excellent facilities for all air sports, especially gliding, which takes advantage of the exceptional local climate.

It is equipped with hangars, an asphalt runway 1,200 meters in length, a campsite and seven bungalows. It also has a dirt runway suitable for model aircraft and ultralights.

Ontur has become a popular destination for glider pilots around the world, drawn by the strong thermal conditions which allow flights of hundreds of kilometres.
