= Albatana =

- Municipality
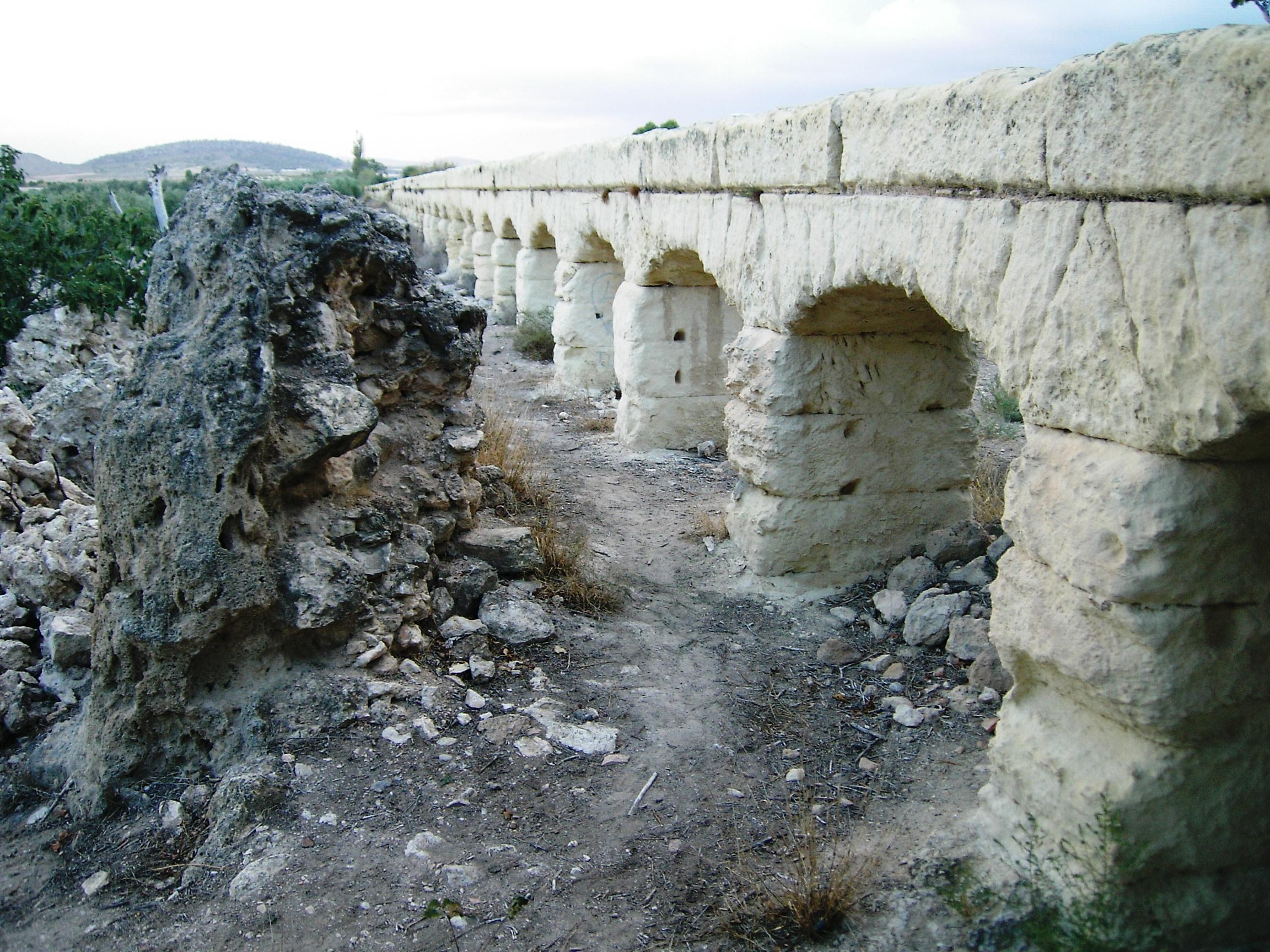
- The old and new aqueducts of Albatana.

- Coat of arms

- Location of Albatana. Albatana (Castilla-La Mancha)
- Country: Spain
- Community: Castilla-La Mancha
- Province: Albacete

Government
  - Mayor: Francisco José Mansilla Pérez (PSOE)

Area
  - Total: 30.53 km^{2} (11.79 sq mi)

Population (2023)
  - Total: 655
  - Density: 21.5/km^{2} (55.6/sq mi)
- Time zone: UTC+1 (CET)
  - Summer (DST): UTC+2 (CEST)
- Postal code: 02653
- Website: www.albatana.es

Albatana is a municipality in Albacete, Castile-La Mancha, Spain. It has a population of 655.
