= List of aqueducts in the Roman Empire =

This is a list of aqueducts in the Roman Empire. For a more complete list of known and possible Roman aqueducts and Roman bridges see List of Roman bridges.

== Aqueducts in the Roman Empire ==
Name	Location	Image	Coordinates	Length x Height	Construction Started	Service Started	Demolition or Decommission	Influencer
Saldae Aqueduct	Toudja, Algeria		36°45′N 4°54′E					
Plovdiv	Plovdiv, Bulgaria		42°7′50″N 24°43′25″E	30 km x				
Plavno Polje	Šibenik-Knin County, Croatia			32.6 km x 0.296 m	AD 1			
Aqueduct of Diocletian	Solin, Croatia		43°31′27″N 16°29′22″E	9 km x 16.5 m	3rd century AD		1932	
Kamares Aqueduct	Larnaca, Cyprus		34.912131°N 33.598729°E		1747			
Nicosia aqueduct	Nicosia, Cyprus		35°10′19″N 33°22′11″E		18th century			
Clausonnes	Antibes, France							
Barbegal aqueduct	Arles, France		43°42′09″N 4°43′17″E					
Aqueduct of the Gier	Lyon, France		45°43′17″N 4°45′37″E	85 km	1st century AD			
Aqueduct of Luynes	Luynes, France		47°23′50″N 0°34′06″E	1,825 m			12th or 13th century	
Pont du Gard	Nîmes, France	Pont du Gard in France	43°56′50″N 04°32′08″E	275 m x 48.8 m	1st century AD	AD 60	6th century	
Fréjus	France		40 km			AD 50		
Aqueduct from Gorze to Metz	Metz, France							
Eifel Aqueduct	Germany		50.5127°N 6.6108°E	130 km x 1 m	AD 80		260	
Sumelocenna	Rottenburg, Germany		48.46362°N 8.86234°E		ca. AD 100			
Herodes Atticus Aqueduct	Doliana, Greece							
Hadrian	Argos, Greece							
Peisistratid	Athens, Greece							
Long Walls	Athens, Greece							
Late Roman	Athens, Greece							
Corinth	Corinthia, Greece							
Chalcis	Chalcis, Greece							
Aqueduct of Kavala	Kavala, Greece		40.9369°N 24.4155°E		16th century			
Mytilene	Lesbos, Greece							
Nicopolis	Epirus, Greece							
Patras	Greece							
Biar Aqueduct	Israel		31.655908854727446°N 35.14504419777819°E		37 BC - 4 BC		1967	Herod the Great
Caesarea upper aqueduct	Caesarea Maritima, Israel	אמת המים-קיסריה-3.4.14		5.4 km				Herod the Great and successors
Caesarea second aqueduct	Caesarea Maritima, Israel							Hadrian
Jerusalem low-level aqueduct	Jerusalem							Hasmonean / Herodian
Jerusalem high-level aqueduct	Jerusalem							
Qumran aqueduct	Qumran, West Bank	Qumran, Dead Sea, Palestine 49						
Aqua Anio Vetus	Pleiades, Italy				330 BC	AD 640		
Aqua Augusta	Naples, Italy			140 km	between 30 and 20 BC			
Aqua Marcia	Rome, Italy		41.8711°N 12.5389°E		between 144–140 BC	144 BC	140 BC	
Aqua Tepula	Rome, Italy		41.888976°N 12.453132°E			126 BC	127 BC	Lucius Cassius Longinus Ravilla
Aqua Anio Novus	horti Epaphroditiani, Italy		41°53′29″N 12°30′55″E		38 AD			
Aqua Alexandrina	Rome, Italy		41°52′42″N 12°34′24″E	22.4 km	AD 226	AD 226		
Aqua Alsietina	Rome, Italy		41°53′12″N 12°28′10″E	32.8 km	2 BC			
Aqua Appia	Rome, Italy		41°53′22″N 12°30′40″E		312 BC	312 BC		
Aqua Claudia – Pictured are the remains of aqueducts Aqua Claudia and Aqua Anio Novus at Porta Maggiore in Rome, integrated into the Aurelian Wall as a gate in AD 271	Rome, Italy							
Aqua Virgo	Rome, Italy							
Minturno	Italy							
Ponte delle Torri	Italy, Spoleto							
Aqua Crabra	Italy, Tusculum							
Pont d'Aël	Italy, Aosta Valley							
Termini Imerese	Italy, Sicily							
Aqueduct of Triglio	Italy, Apulia		69 40°34′50.82″N 17°12′9.63″E		123 BC			
Gadara Aqueduct	Jordan, Gadara		32.6808°N 35.8691°E					
Aqueduct of Zubaida	Lebanon, Beirut							
Aqueduct of Tyre	Lebanon, Tyre							
Aqueduct of Msaylha	Lebanon, Batroun							
Aqueduct of Nahr Ibrahim	Lebanon, Byblos							
Aqueduct of Volubilis	Morocco, Volubilis							
Skopje Aqueduct	North Macedonia							
Aqueduto de São Sebastião	Portugal, Coimbra				AD 1568	AD 1570		
Acueducto de Sexi (Note: Almuñécar consists of 5 above ground aqueducts – 4 still in use)	Spain, Almuñécar							
Albarracin-Gea-Cella	Spain							
Aqua Fontis Aureae (aqueduct of Cordoba)	Spain							
Aqua Nova Domitiana Augusta (aqueduct of Cordoba)	Spain							
Aqueduct of Valdepuentes (Cordoba)	Spain							
Baelo Claudia's aqueduct	Spain, Bolonia							
Barcino	Spain							
Bejís	Spain							
Roman aqueduct of Cádiz	Spain, Cádiz							
Caños de Carmona	Spain, Seville							
Itálica	Spain							
Las Medulas	Spain							
Les Ferreres Aqueduct	Spain, Tarragona							
Los Bañales	Spain							
Acueducto de los Milagros	Spain, Mérida							
Lugo	Spain							
Noain	Spain, Pamplona, Navarra							
Onuba Aestuaria	Spain							
Peña Cortada	Spain							
Rabo de Buey-San Lázaro	Spain							
S'Argamassa's aqueduct	Spain							
Segobriga's Aqueduct	Spain, Saelices							
Aqueduct of Segovia	Spain, Segovia			? x 28m				
Aqueduct of Toletum	Spain, Toledo							
Aqueduct of Hama	Syria							
Aqueduct of Hadrian	Tunisia							
Zaghouan Aqueduct	Tunisia, Carthage			132 km				
Valens Aqueduct	Turkey, Istanbul							
Aspendos	Turkey, Antalya Province							
Karapınar Aqueduct	Turkey, İzmir							
Kızılçullu Aqueduct	Turkey, İzmir							
Vezirsuyu Aqueduct	Turkey, İzmir							
Lamas Aqueduct	Turkey, Mersin Province							
Olba Aqueduct	Turkey, Mersin Province							
Laodicea on the Lycus	Turkey, Denizli Province							
Phaselis	Turkey, Antalya Province							
Dolaucothi Gold Mines	United Kingdom, Wales, Pumsaint, Carmarthenshire							
Durnovaria	United Kingdom, Dorchester, Dorset							
Longovicium	United Kingdom, Lanchester							
Aqueduct of Ptolmais Cyrenaica	Libya			8 km	c AD 120			

== See also ==
- List of aqueducts
