= Aqueduct of Diocletian =

Diocletian Aqueduct Dioklecijanov akvadukt
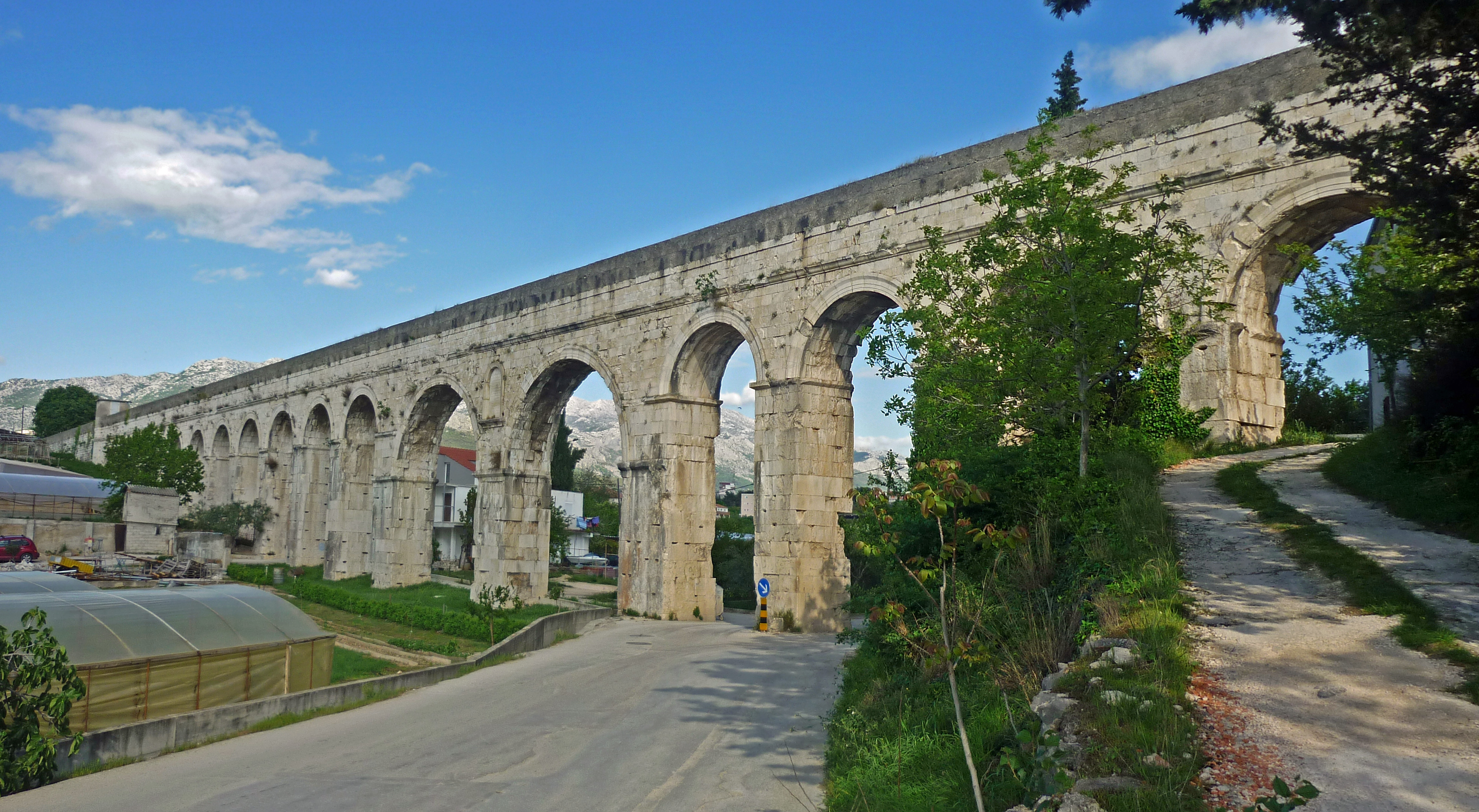
- Coordinates: 43°31′27″N 16°29′22″E
- Carries: Aqueduct
- Locale: Solin, Split, Dalmatia, Croatia

Characteristics
- Total length: 9 km
- Height: 16.5 m

History
- Construction end: reign of Diocletian (3rd/4th century)

The Aqueduct of Diocletian (Croatian: Dioklecijanov akvadukt) is an ancient Roman aqueduct near Split, Croatia (Latin: Spalatum) constructed during the Roman Empire to supply water to the palace of the emperor Diocletian, who was Augustus 284 to 305 AD, retired to Spalatum, and died there in 311.

== Description ==
The Aqueduct of Diocletian was constructed between the end of 3rd and beginning of the 4th century AD, at the same time as the palace.

The aqueduct took water from the river Jadro, 9 kilometres northeast of Diocletian's Palace, today Split's city centre, and brought water to the Palace over a height difference of 13 m. Another aqueduct took water from the same source to Salona. It was destroyed in the invasion of Goths in the middle of 6th century and did not work for thirteen centuries after that.

The first reconstruction of the aqueduct took place during the reign of the Austro-Hungarian Empire (1877–1880). The Diocletianic aqueduct was abandoned in 1932, when the modern water station was built in Kopilica, a peripheral area of Split. The best-preserved part of the aqueduct near Dujmovača (Solin) has a maximum height of 16.5 m and a length of 180 m. The aqueduct is currently being restored.

== See also ==
- List of aqueducts in the Roman Empire
- List of Roman aqueducts by date
- Ancient Roman technology
- Roman engineering
