= Aqua Crabra =

Coordinates: 41°47′54″N 12°42′39″E

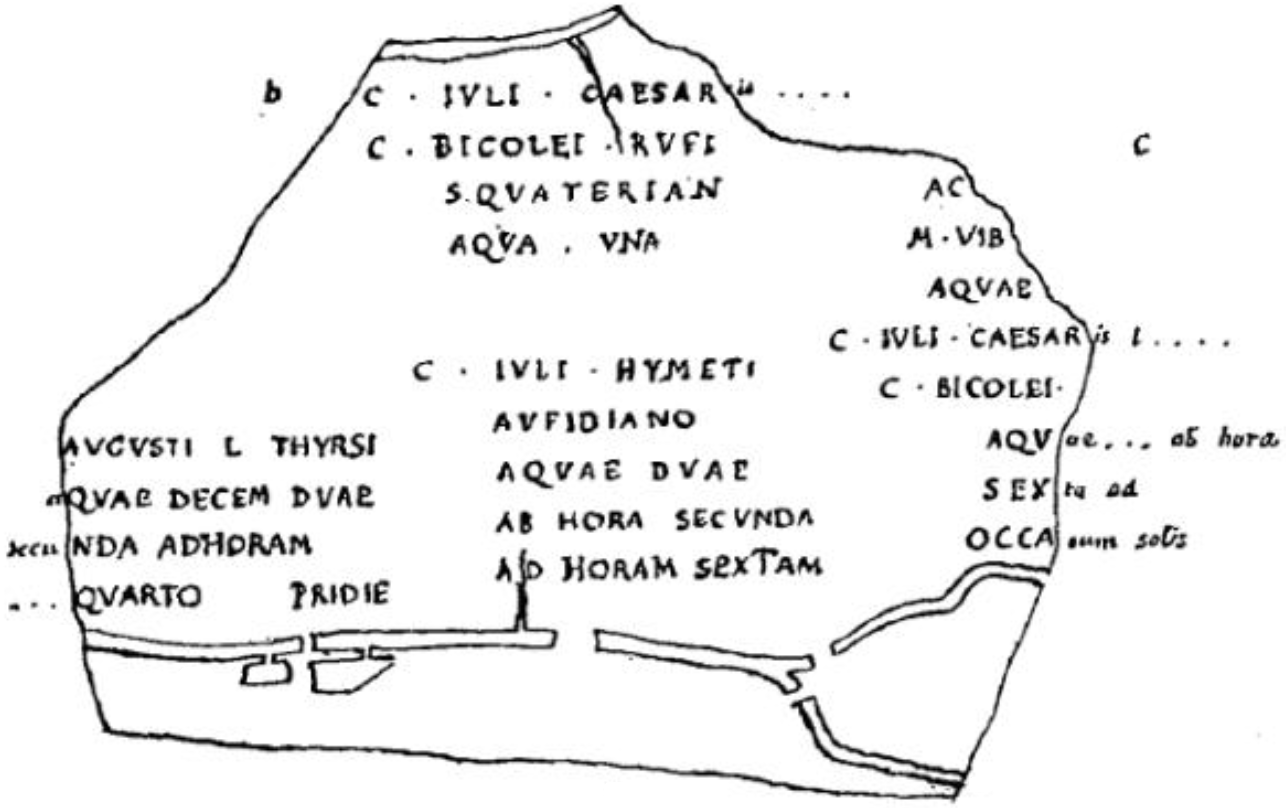
Fragment of a plan showing the water distribution near Tusculum, CIL VI, 1261.

Aqua Crabra was a Roman aqueduct supplying villas in the hinterland of the ancient town of Tusculum.

The Aqua Crabra is described by Cicero in his treatise De Lege Agraria ("On the Agrarian Law") where we learn it supplied his villa near Tusculum.

The aqueduct is also attested in the text of Frontinus. The Crabra is sometimes referred to as Aqua Mariana or Aqua Maranna del Maria.

The evidence offered by CIL VI, 1261 was interpreted by Mommsen to be connected with the Aqua Crabra, even though there is no specific mention of it in the fragmentary text.

Archaeological discoveries announced in December 2014 in conjunction with Rome's Metro C excavations have been preliminarily linked with the Aqua Crabra. This discovery consists of a large hydraulic reservoir, perhaps the largest known from the ancient city, along with a water wheel and agricultural implements.

== See also ==
- List of aqueducts in the Roman Empire
- List of Roman aqueducts by date
- Ancient Roman technology
- Roman engineering
