= Aqueduct of Luynes =

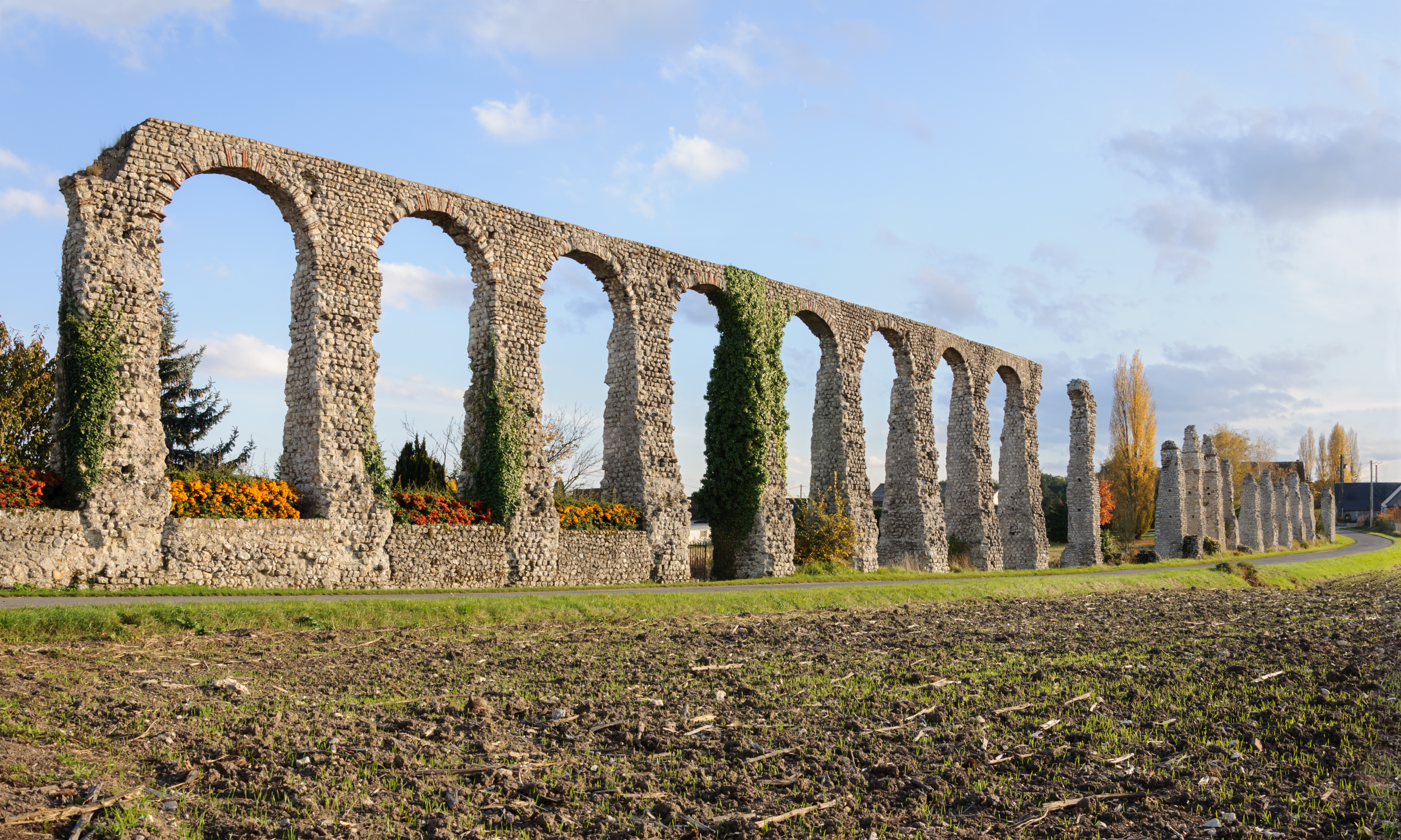
- Surviving piers of the Gallo-Roman aqueduct at Luynes

- Location within France
- 47°23′50″N 0°34′06″E
- Type: Roman aqueduct / Hydraulic engineering
- Periods: Classical antiquity, Roman
- Cultures: Gallo-Roman, Roman
- Satellite of: Roman Empire
- Location: Luynes, Indre-et-Loire, France
- Region: Centre-Val de Loire
- Part of: Water supply system of Malliacum

History
- Built: c. 2nd–3rd century A.D.
- Abandoned: c. 12th–13th century A.D.

Site notes
- Material: Mortar, stone block masonry (opus incertum), flat terracotta bricks
- Height: 8.90 m (29.2 ft)
- Length: 1,825 m (5,988 ft)
- Condition: Ruined (44 surviving piers out of the original 99)
- Owner: Municipal property (Owned by the town of Luynes)
- Management: Commune of Luynes
- Public access: Yes

The Aqueduct of Luynes is a former Gallo-Roman bridge aqueduct located in Luynes, France.

== Description ==
The remains show a stack of five arches and it is the most famous Roman monument in the Department of Indre-et-Loire, despite its modest dimensions. It is also one of the best preserved of the Northern aqueducts. It was classified a historical monument in 1862 and is owned by the town of Luynes.

It originally had a total length of 1,825 metres (5,988 ft), almost in a straight line, including 525 metres (1,722 ft) of raised causeway. Its underground portion, and in particular its final journey, passes the hamlet of Villeronde. Only a portion of the aqueduct-bridge is now visible as it passes through the "Valley of the Arennes".

The actual channel for the water is masonry and not a lead or terracotta piping and has a slope of 1.5 cm to 2.9 m per kilometre. The maximum height of the arches of the aqueduct is 8.90 m.

== History ==
The remains of the aqueduct-bridge are located 1.5 km northeast of the centre of Luynes, in Indre-et-Loire. It has a general orientation of north-northeast to south-southwest, taking water from the now dry Pie Noire (or Pinnoire), and is believed to have supplied water to ancient Luynes, or even Caesarodunum.

It has been conjectured, however, that the aqueduct was privately owned and serviced the complex of private villas at Sainte-Roselle. Its construction has not yet been dated with certainty; the construction style would indicate the 2nd or 3rd century, like the resort that it fed.

It remained in use until the 12th or 13th century and has been the subject of several repair campaigns, especially at the beginning of the 10th century, under Charles the Simple, which is why it has survived so well, even if number of stones of its collapsed piles had to be recovered and used. This suggests that its use has changed throughout this period, despite the abandonment of the seaside resort of Sainte-Roselle.

== See also ==
- List of aqueducts in the Roman Empire
- List of Roman aqueducts by date
- Ancient Roman technology
- Roman engineering
- Fontenay aqueduct
