= Los Bañales =

Roman archaeological site

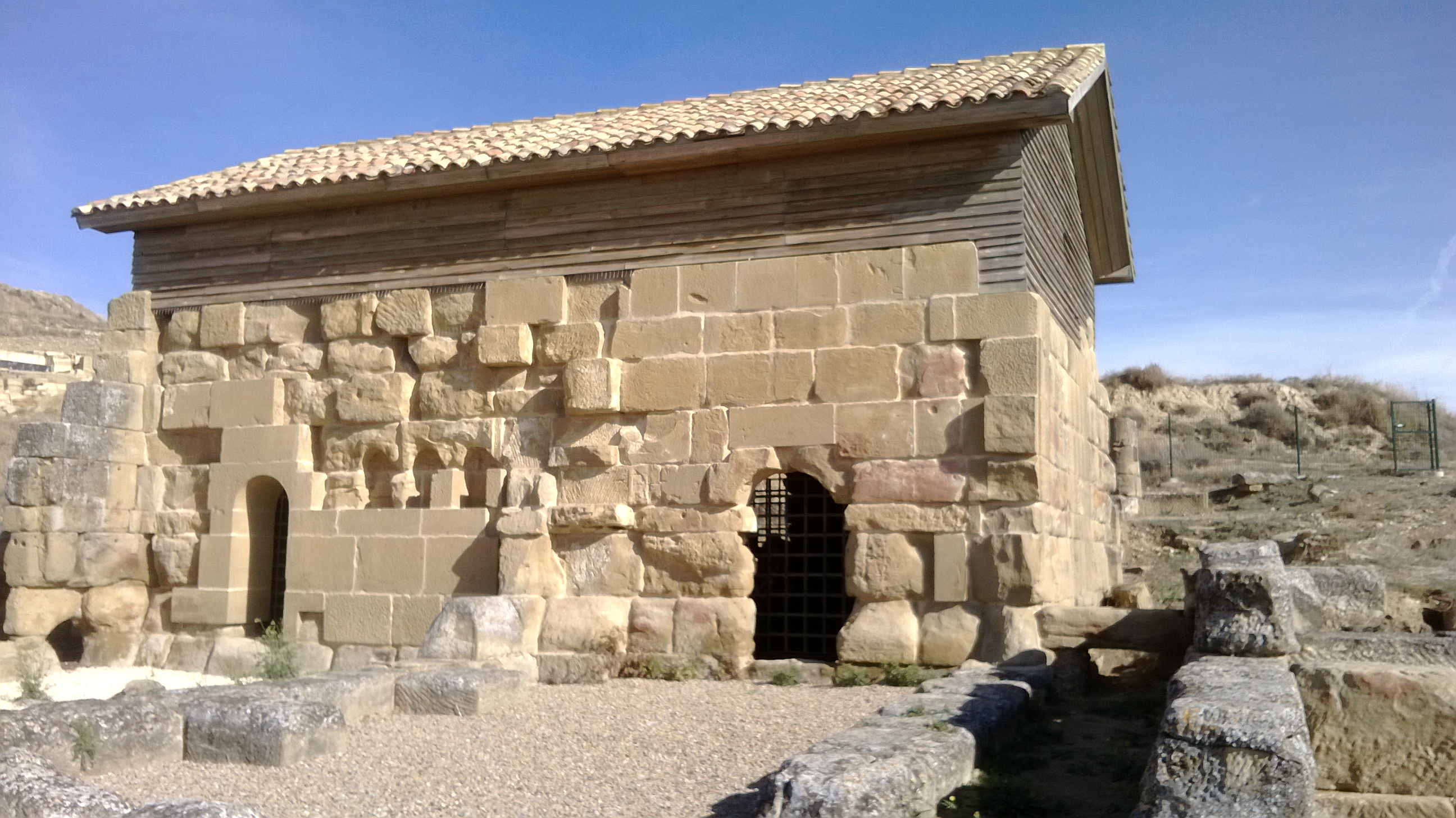
- The Roman baths at Los Bañales

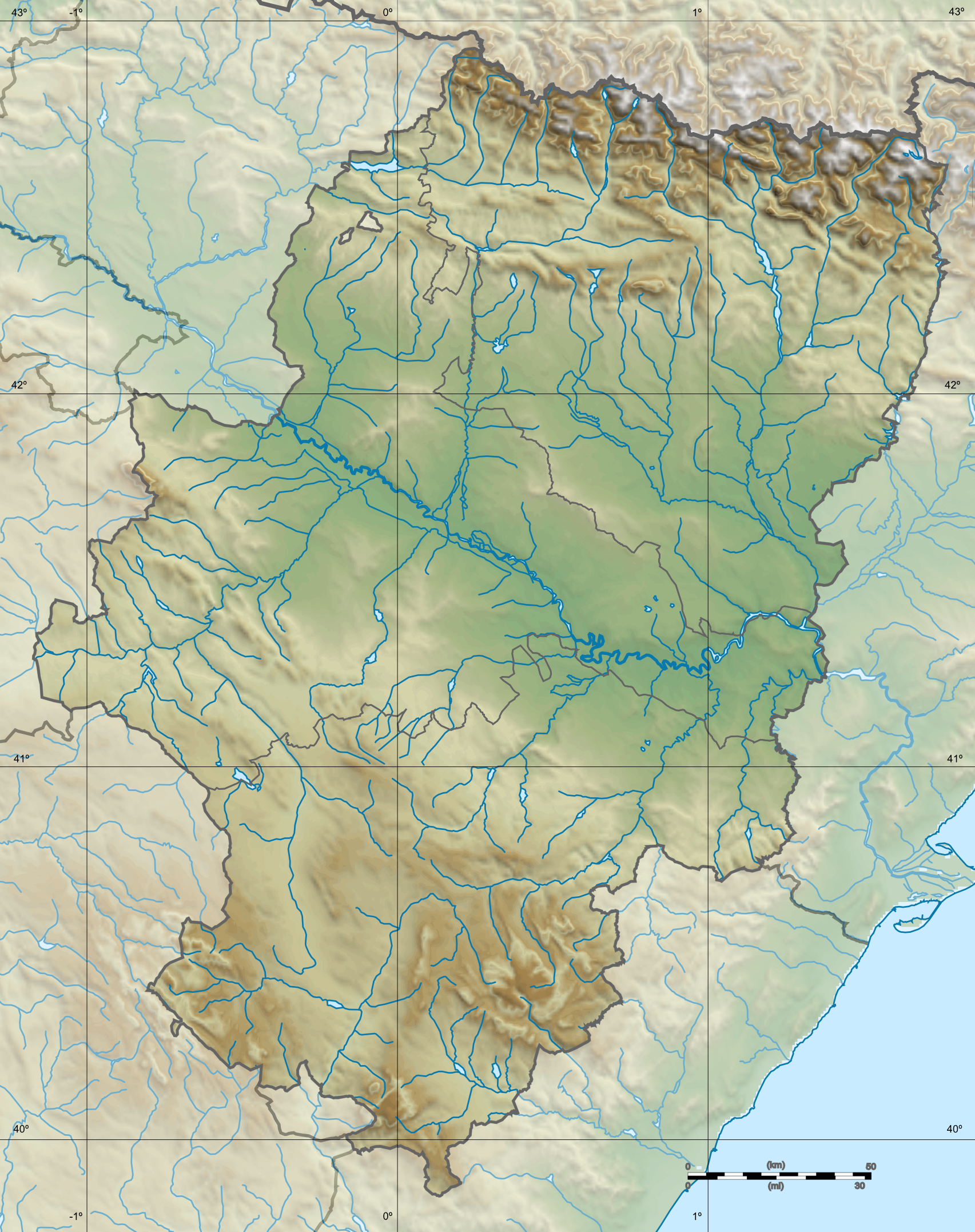
- Location within Aragon Location within Spain
- 42.288564°N 1.230344°W
- Type: City and hinterland: forum, domestic zone, craftwork zone, commercial zone, baths, aqueduct, dam, necropolis
- Periods: primarily Roman Empire
- Cultures: Vascones, Roman, Visigoth, Muslim, Medieval
- Location: Uncastillo, Aragon, Spain
- Region: Cinco Villas

History
- Built: pre-Roman, 1st c BCE/CE
- Abandoned: 3rd c. CE / 9th c. CE

Site notes
- Material: Ceramics, bronze and marble sculpture, bone artefacts, inscriptions in situ, wall painting
- Area: 24 ha (59 acres)
- Excavation dates: 1942-1947, 1972-1979, 1998-2001, 2008-
- Archaeologists: Galiay, J. 1942-1947 Beltrán, A. 1972-1979 Viladés, J. y Zapater, M.A. 1998-2001 Andreu, J. y Bienes, J.J. 2008-
- Condition: Excavation ongoing
- Owner: Public
- Management: Fundación Uncastillo
- Public access: Open to the public
- Website: http://www.losbanales.es

Los Bañales is a Roman archaeological site located in the municipality of Uncastillo, in the northwestern part of the province of Zaragoza, Spain. It is located in the region of the Cinco Villas, with extensive occupation before, during, and after the Roman period. The site is a case study for the archaeological study of urbanization, cultural change, imperialism, trade and exchange, landscape, and social history.

The site consists of a city whose name remains unconfirmed, although it is likely to have been Tarraca. It occupies an area of more than twenty hectares (49 acres), bounded on the north by a monumental residential space, on the south by two sizeable hills, on the east by the elevated remains of a Roman aqueduct, and on the west by a necropolis. Large monumental thermal baths were constructed at the end of the 1st century CE and an aqueduct transported water to the city from a nearby reservoir. The current name of the site comes from the hermitage of Our Lady of The Baths (Nuestra Señora de Los Bañales), which was built within what is now the archaeological area.

In the early years of work at the site, only the extensive hydraulic system was studied in detail. Since 2008 research has resumed and new architectural spaces and material culture have been uncovered, including domestic, commercial, and possibly religious structures and artefacts as well as evidence for Roman, late antique, and medieval occupation. At present the project has the support of the Directorate General of Cultural Heritage of the Government of Aragon, the District of the Cinco Villas and the municipalities of Uncastillo, Sádaba, Layana and Biota.

| Spain | Bien de Interés Cultural (declared in 2003) |

== Historical background ==
Los Bañales lies in a territory that ancient sources such as Pliny the Elder, Ptolemy, Livy, and Strabo attribute to the Vascones, a people that occupied the territories of present-day Navarre and the Cinco Villas from Aragon to the River Gállego. As such, in the Roman period it would have belonged to the jurisdiction of Caesaraugusta, present-day Zaragoza. Communication was maintained by means of a road network that linked the ports of Tarraco (Tarragona) and Oiasso (Irún) through Caesaraugusta and Pompelo (Pamplona). Before arriving at Los Bañales, that same route passed through the Roman city in Ejea de los Caballeros, perhaps the Segia of ancient sources. Part of this route probably led through Los Bañales as far as Aquitania through the old Roman cities located in Cabezo Ladrero (Sofuentes) and Campo Real / Fillera (Sos del Rey Católico-Sangüesa). The existence of such a highly interconnected social and economic network might help explain the monumentality of Los Bañales and other nearby cities.

The Romans arrived in the area around 195 BCE. We do not know the name that the indigenous inhabitants had for the city at that time. Many names have been proposed - Clarina, Muscaria, Atiliana - but what is currently considered more plausible is Tarraca, the Terracha listed in the Ravenate (IV 43 - 311,11) which is a ciuitas foederata according to the lists of Pliny (Nat. 3, 24) concerning the legal convent of Caesaraugusta, the Tarraga vascona cited by Ptolemy (U 6, 66), in the way of Caesaraugusta to Pompelo, although this route is not mentioned in the Antonine Itinerary. Only the future appearance of a public inscription in which the name of the city appears would resolve the question.

According to the latest known data, the city had - at least in its lower and most monumental part – an initial and almost complete abandonment around the third century CE. This resulted in a transfer of its local elites to rural estates, which they had exploited since the first century BCE, and a retraction of its settlement towards the central hill of El Pueyo, where settlement seems to survive until the 9th century CE.

== History of archaeological activity ==
In June 1931, the Gaceta de Madrid, predecessor of the Official State Gazette, included Los Bañales de Uncastillo and other monuments in the area, such as the Mausoleum of the Atilii and the Sádaba Synagogue in the National Artistic Treasury. Seventy years later, in March 2003, these sites were declared to be of cultural interest by the Directorate General of Heritage of the Government of Aragon.1 From 1931 to 2003, the site was the scene of archaeological actions on three occasions:

Between 1942 and 1947 directed by José Galiay. This team excavated the baths, El Pueyo, the area of the two columns and the northwest corner of the forum, which Galiay interpreted as a temple.

Between 1972 and 1979 directed by Antonio Beltrán. This team excavated the thermal baths in their totality -including its reconstruction- a quarter in El Pueyo, already excavated by Galiay. They carried out complete studies on the aqueduct and the hydraulic system, and in the last campaigns, they re-excavated the zone of the two columns, erroneously treated as a macellum - market-place -. Between 1998 and 2001 directed by José María Viladés and Miguel Ángel Zapater. They excavated an area east of the baths.

Currently and without interruption since 2008, the site is the subject of a Research Plan commissioned by the Directorate General of Heritage of the Government of Aragon to the Uncastillo Foundation and directed by the archaeologist Juan José Bienes and the historian Javier Andreu.

Since 2015, Los Bañales has had a constantly growing Virtual Museum hosted on the Sketchfab platform which is one of the platforms most commonly used by heritage projects and institutions. The museum collects 3D digitalizations of all types of archaeological material - from structures to objects of material culture - not only from Los Bañales but also from other archaeological sites in the District of Las Cinco Villas. On September 30, 2016, the Los Bañales archaeological project was awarded the Local / Regional prize in the First Edition of the Sísifo Awards for research, defense and dissemination of the Archaeological Heritage, promoted by the Sisyphus Research Group of the University of Córdoba through its project of Scientific Culture - Arqueología Somos Todos (We are all Archaeology)- highlighting the commitment to the dissemination and socialization of heritage that, since 2008, has been developing in Los Bañales. The award ceremony took place at the University of Córdoba on October 27, 2016.

Campaign seasons at Los Bañales since 2008
| Year | Excavation | Survey | Seasons in El Pueyo | Geoarchaeology |
|---|---|---|---|---|
| 2008 | | Season I, II y III | | |
| 2009 | Season I | Season IV | | |
| 2010 | Season II. | Season V | | |
| 2011 | Season III. | Season VI | | Season I |
| 2012 | Season IV | Season VII | Season I y II | Season II |
| 2013 | Season V. | Season VIII | Season III | Season III |
| 2014 | Season VI | Season IX | Season IV | Season IV |
| 2015 | Season VII | Season X | | Season V |
| 2016 | Season VIII. | Season XI | | |
| 2017 | Season IX | Season XII | | |
| 2018 | Season X | | | |

== Urban center ==
To the south of the municipality of Uncastillo lies a broad area known as Los Bañales. The area contains the remains of a large Roman city whose name is still debated. Study of the site enables us to understand the principle difficulties that Rome faced in establishing urban centers in such locations. Nonetheless, it is one of the most prosperous and monumental urban centers in the Ebro valley. While study of the site is ongoing, the site has already yielded magnificent examples of Roman public and private architecture, and hydraulic engineering

=== El Pueyo ===
Archaeological examination of the city has calculated that the city of Los Bañales occupied an area of approximately 24 hectares, between the southern slope of the hill of El Pueyo and the mound of El Huso and La Rueca (503m), all the way to the bottom of the valley, where two large round stones in a vertical position were raised in the Roman era and bear (images/inscriptions) of old legends of giants and Sasones, possibly one of the city's boundary markers along the passing road.

The hill of El Pueyo, a small promontory 567 meters in height and a little less than a hundred on the surrounding land, is possibly the original location of the pre-Roman settlement. The settlement became culturally acculturated to a different extent in each of the three terraces on which it is built. According to the latest known evidence, the hill was most likely occupied until the 9th c CE., A gradual process of abandonment processes over the previous centuries and the hill's inhabitants scattered throughout the nearby territory.

Each terrace had a different domestic character. Thus, in the area closest to the forum, a central street -partially excavated by José Galiay and still visible today- served as the axis around which houses were located radially. Protecting the second terrace remains of a wall made with large ashlars. At the highest point of the hill vestiges of a monumental building, perhaps a Roman temple continuing its pre-Roman use. The entire valley is visually dominated from the summit of the hill, and this may explain the location of the possible temple.

Excavations in the last few years have produced a notable crop of ceramic material from the 8th and 9th centuries CE, as well as the discovery of a unique bone scapula with Arabic text.

El Pueyo

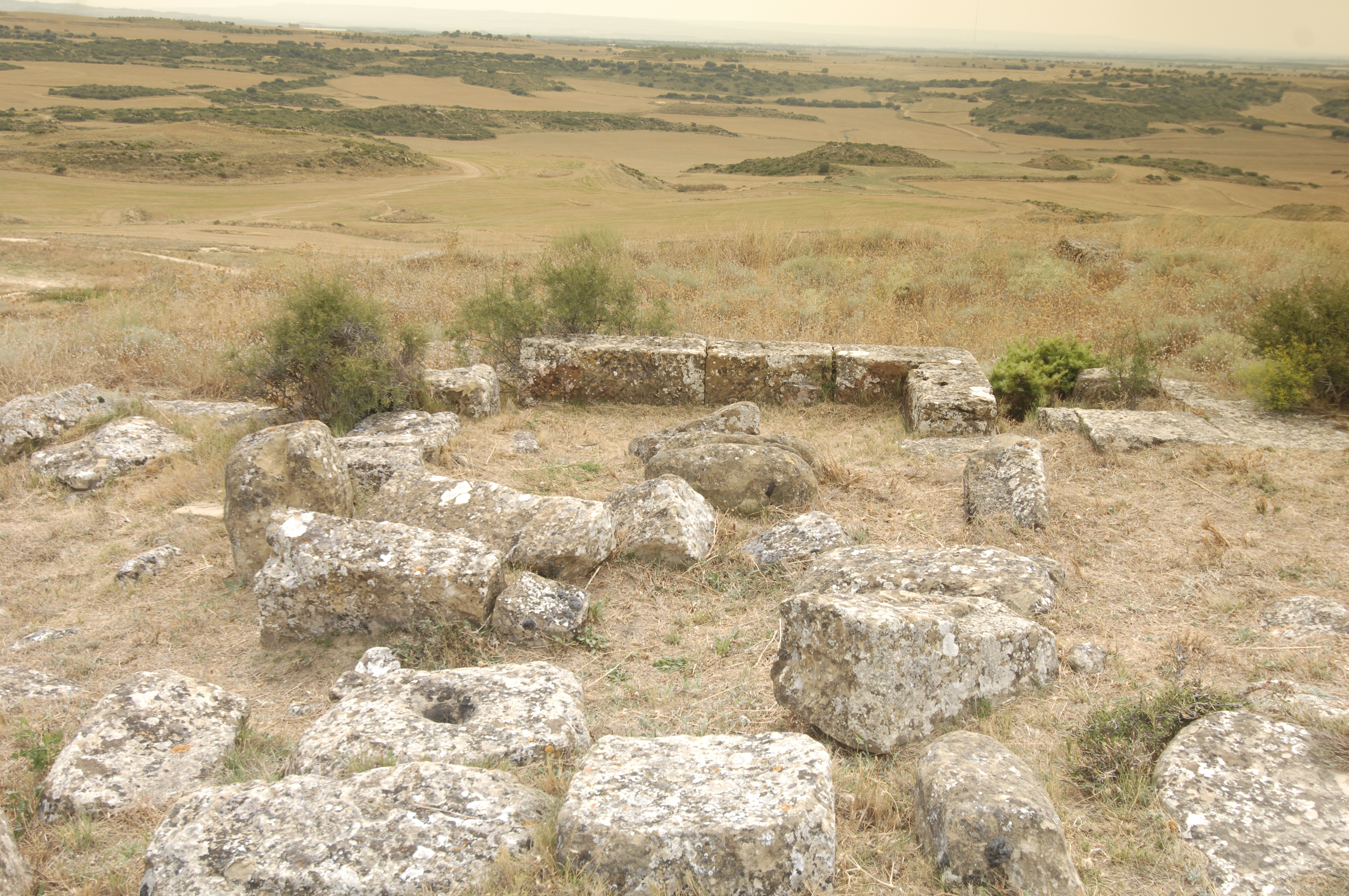
Possible remains of a temple

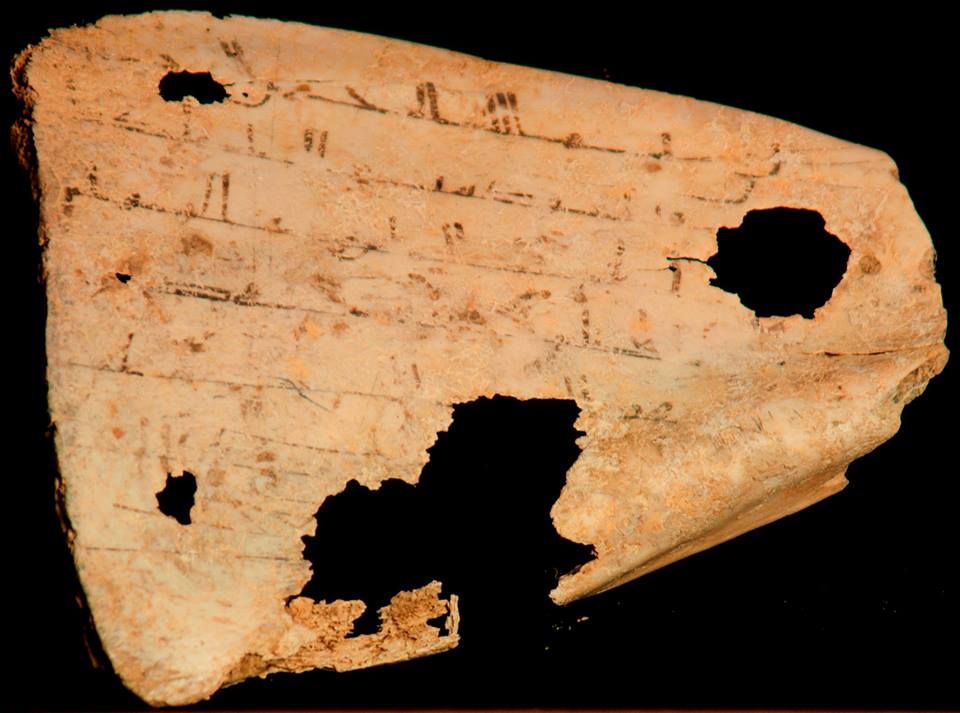
Bone scapula with Arabic text

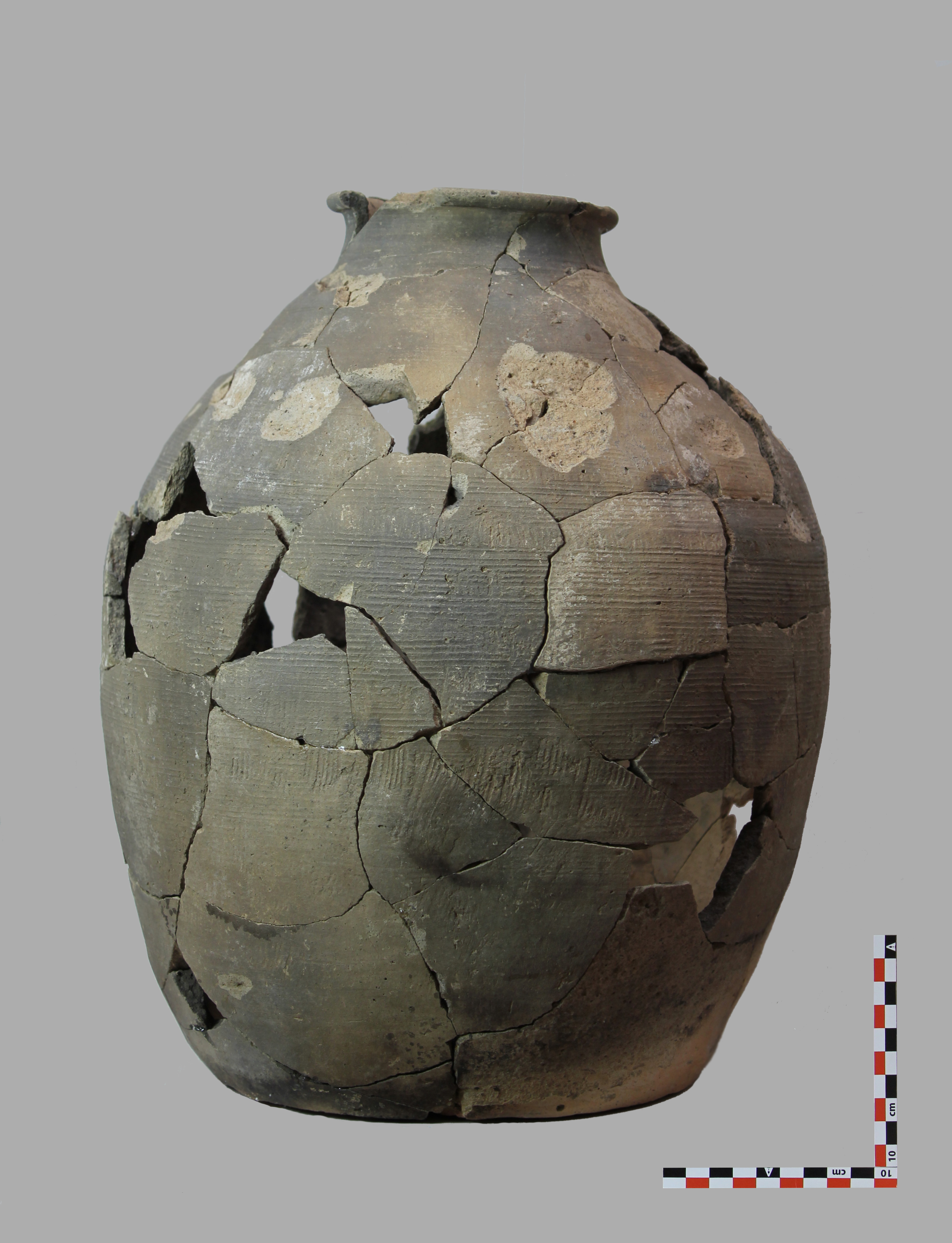
8th/9th century CE ceramic vessel

=== The forum ===
The first terrace of El Pueyo could have been reserved for public purposes. This is evidenced by the remains of the building that José Galiay called a temple in his excavations in the 1940s, consisting of an important concentration of pedestals and molding elements of remarkable size next to a wall closing at an angle towards the hill and that they had not returned to be a reason for study until the beginning of the current Research Plan, revealing without a doubt that it is in fact a monumental forum until now only part of its north and west sides are known. The actions carried out in the last excavation campaigns - since 2008 - have revealed that the forum was based on large foundation boxes seated on the rock itself and made with large ashlar stones, which suggests that the upper spaces were of an imposing majesty. This together with its elevated and terraced situation in a wide area between the hermitage of Nuestra Senora de Los Bañales and the way up to El Pueyo suggests that the forum would be ostensibly visible from the road, on its way to the south of the city crossing the valley.

Recent summer excavation campaigns in the forum have continued to produce new results:

Season III (2011) - Exedra in the western portico with four in situ monumental inscriptions of a votive and salutary nature dedicated by one Pompeia Paulla to four deities.

Season IV (2012) - Edicum in the Western Portico -contiguous to the previous one- with a monumental podium with remains of statue bases and with five texts. The texts refer to M. Fabius Nouus and Porcia Fauentina whose statues -judging by the cartels with their names - would occupy the left side of the building, leaving the center reserved for a statue to Victoria Augusta offered by both and the sides for individual tributes by each of them to L. Fabius Placidus, uncle of M Fabius Nouus, and Porcia Germulla, perhaps Porcia's sister. The two epigraphic sets, by decision of the Government of Aragon, were protected by sandstone replicas made by the Stonemasonry Workshop School.

Season V (2013) - A remarkable lot of more than 40 pieces of Roman sculptural material discarded, surely, for conversion into lime. The lot contains pieces in imported white marble as well as remnants of different decorative programs composed of toga and battleship statues. The remains of a shell of an armored statue - Thoracatus - decorated with reliefs alluding to an imperial victory as well as the remains of two legs that allow partial reconstruction of the original sculpture. The Paleorama company works on the Princeps Resurgens project, which aims at the virtual reconstruction by photogrammetric means of this thoracatus.

Season VI (2014) - The complete perimeter of the forum was defined, in the process discovering the western side that was missing. A new batch of more than thirty pieces of white marble of statuary of the forum was also discovered, highlighting among them a new fragment of the breastplate of the thoracatus -complementary to that discovered in the campaign of 2013-and several fragments of imperial portraits of the Julio-Claudian dynasty.

Season VII (2015) – During excavation of the eastern cryptoporticus of the forum, a pedestal appeared, dedicated by the cavalry officer Quintus Sempronius Vitulus to the Emperor Tiberius, in his fifth consulate (31/32 AD). A second pedestal, found in the same area as the first, was dedicated to Lucius Caesar, adopted son of the Emperor Augustus. It can be dated to between 5 BC and 2 AD. A third pedestal in the same area, dedicated by a freedman to the same Quintus Sempronius Vitulus, described his military career as an officer in the Taurian wing and subprefect of a cohort in the cohors Germanorum. A fourth pedestal practically identical to the previous one was also found, although on this occasion the name of the dedicator of the monument was complete, the freedman Aesopus and, unlike the previous one, which was made by Vitulus himself in his will, this was erected by Aesopus on his own initiative.

Season VIII (2016) - The perimeter of the public square was completely defined, with the tabernae on the western side and the street on the way up to El Pueyo on the eastern side.

The forum

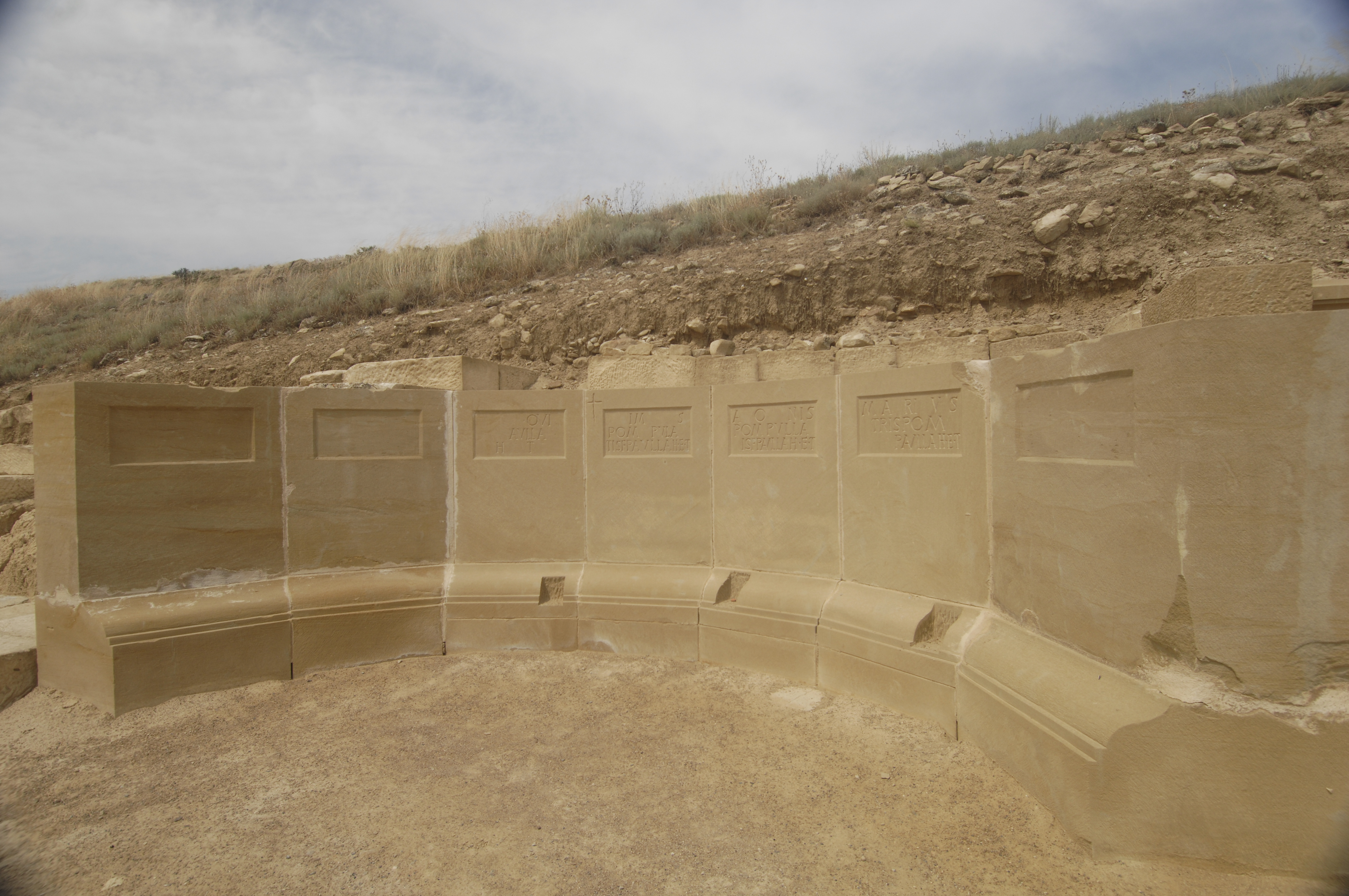
Exedra discovered in the 2011 season

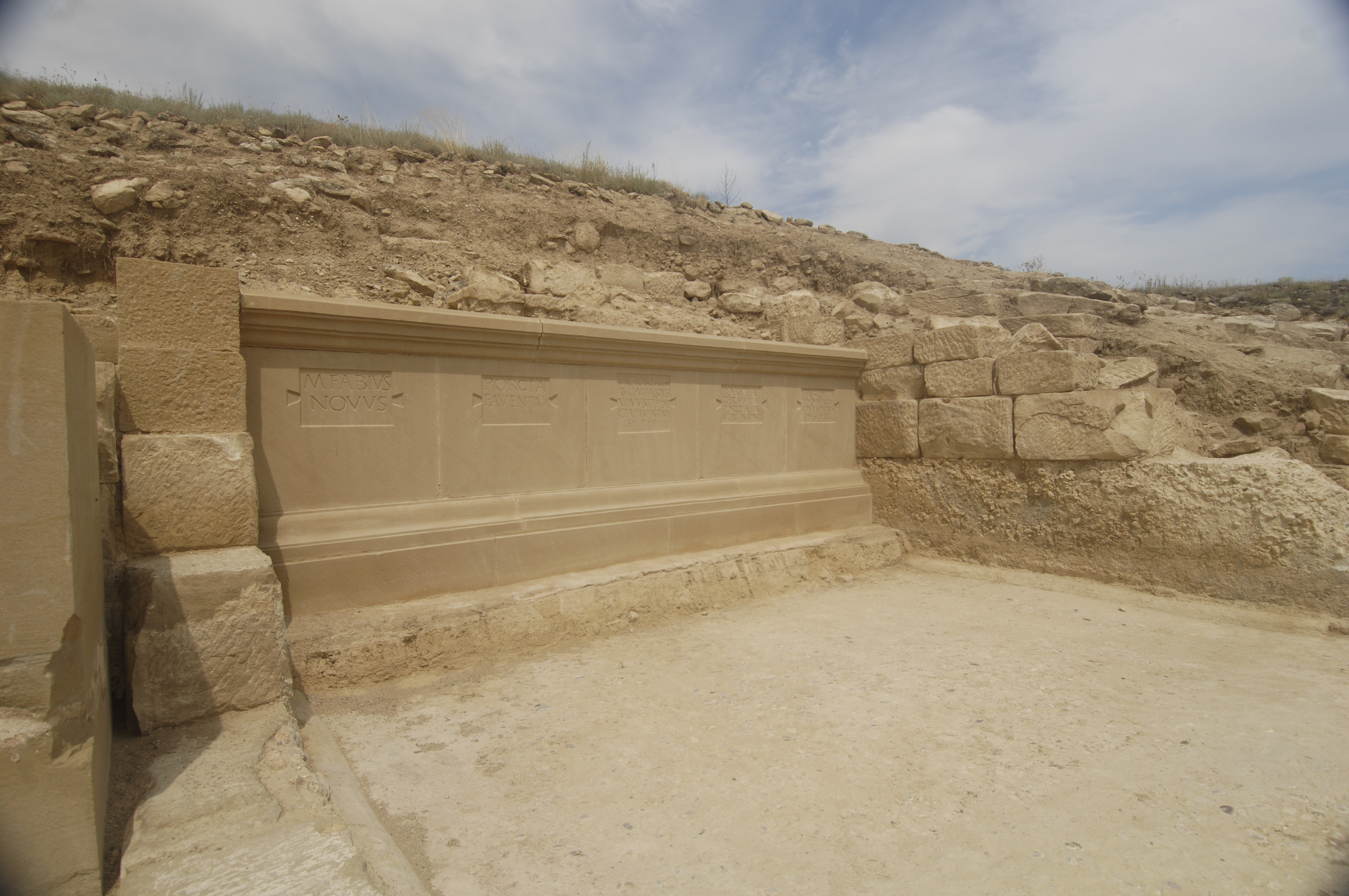
Aedicula discovered in the 2012 season

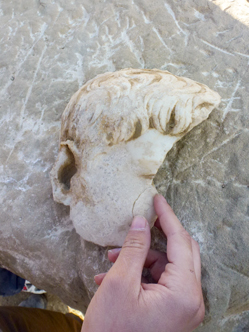
Fragment of a portrait found in the 2014 season

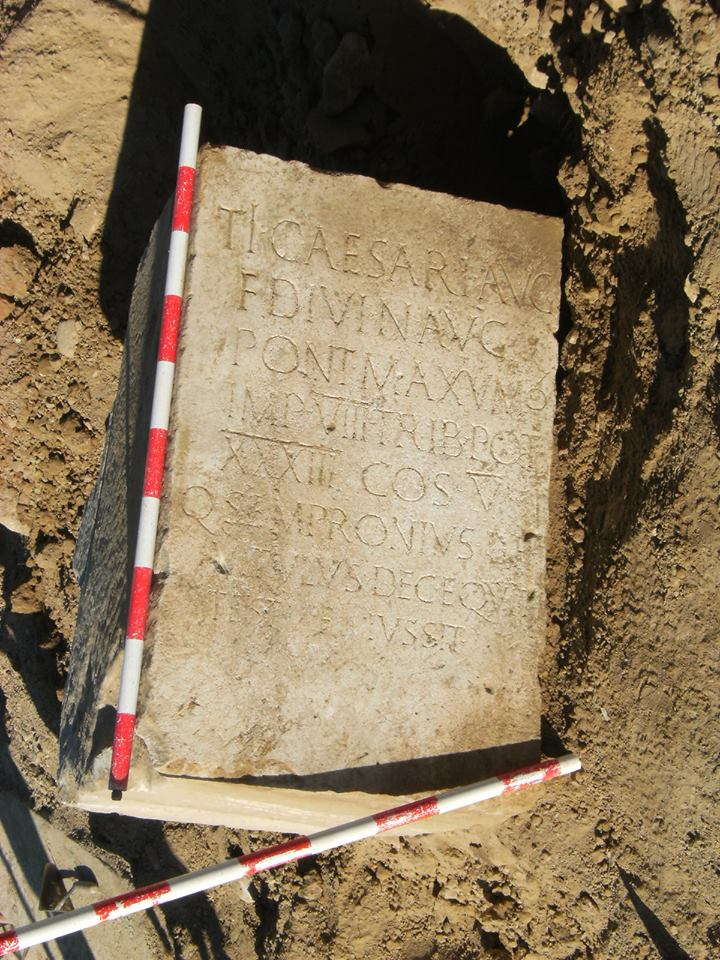
Pedestal discovered in the 2015 season

In 2014, Pablo Serrano Basterra, a fellow of the Research Plan of the Uncastillo Foundation in Los Bañales, with the advice of the project team, used the virtual 3D software Blender in the Forum Renascens to recreate the forum digitally. In early 2018 an application for Android phones and tablets was released which presents the site through a series of multimedia materials such as audio guides, virtual recreations, and 3D videos. This site was the first in Aragón to make an application of this type available to the public. In its first edition it focused on the forum of the Roman city, while it left the rest of the parts of the site for further extensions.

Forum Renascens Project

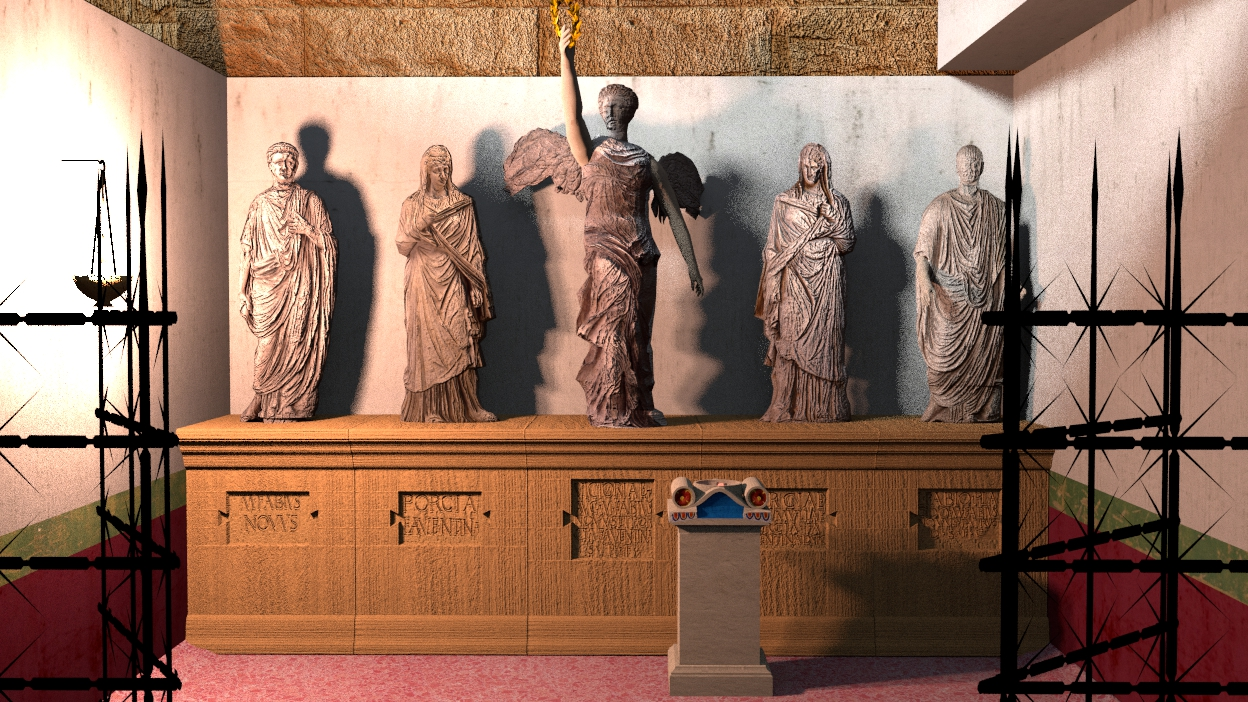
The aedicula, dedicated to Victoria Augusta

=== The baths ===
The baths

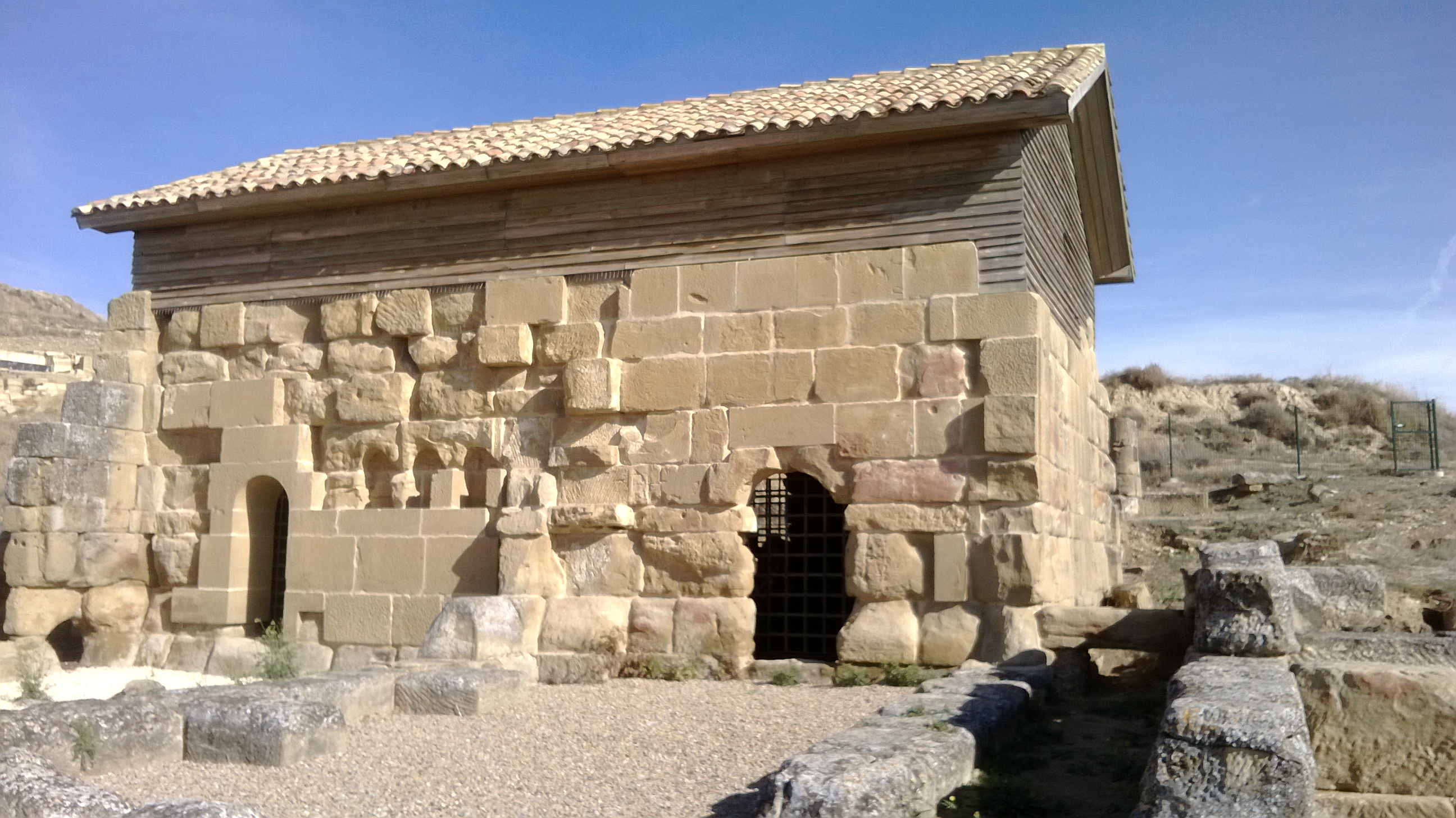
Exterior of the baths of Los Bañales.

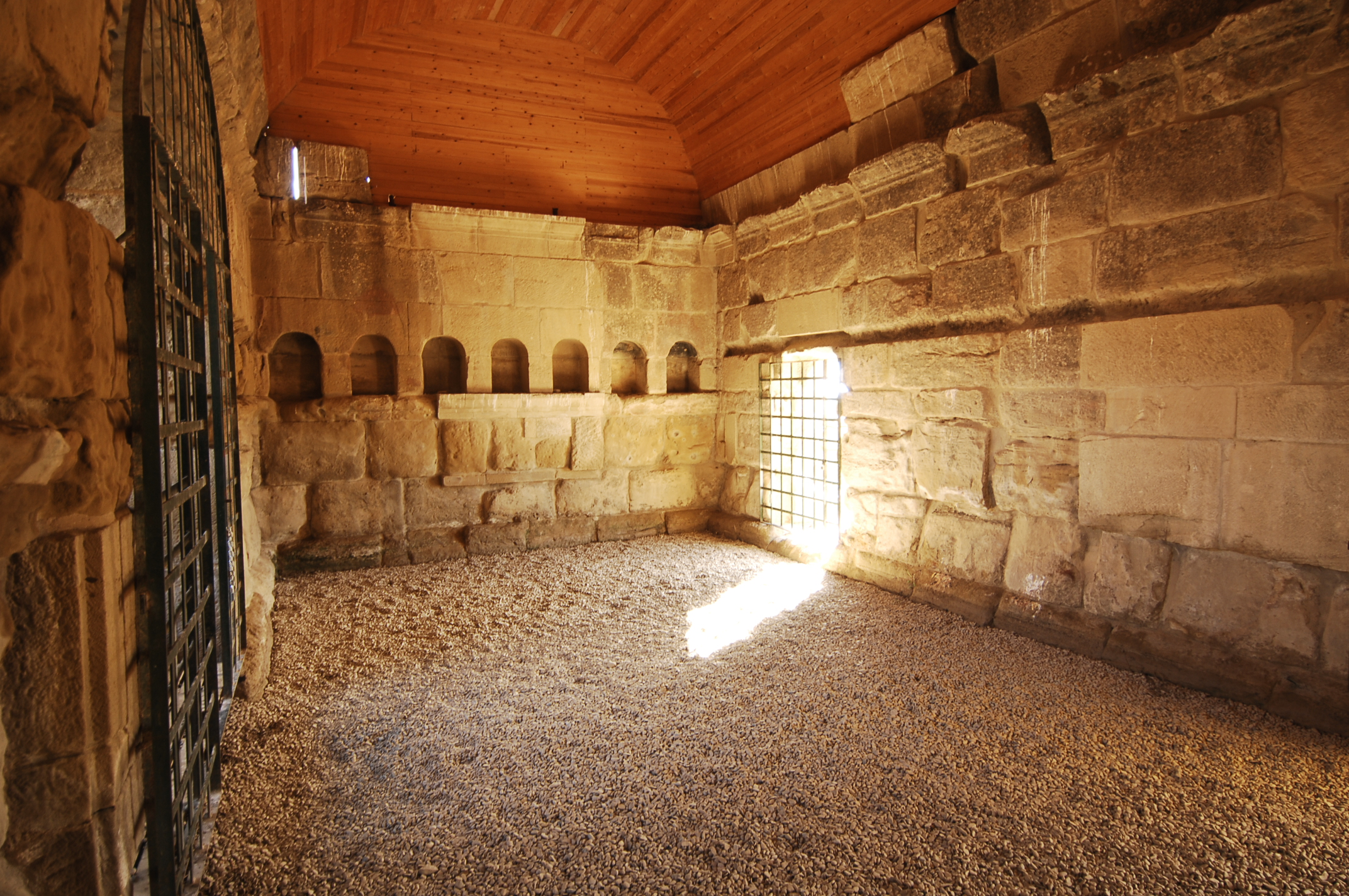
Apodyterium of the baths.

The baths are undoubtedly the most representative monument of the site of Los Bañales and possibly an inspiring element of the current name of the area, related to the baths. To a great extent, its current excellent state of preservation is due to its use for years as a dwelling. It was described in 1610 by Juan Bautista Labaña, a Portuguese geographer, author of a map and an itinerary of the Kingdom of Aragón.

They were excavated by the teams of both José Galiay and later by Antonio Beltrán, who restored it to the state it is in today. It measures about 530 m2 and has a capacity for approximately sixty people. Given the estimated size of the city's population, this is not large enough, and this suggests that there would not be the only baths available. The building was accessed from two small lobbies with benches, which allowed control of the entry and exits, from there to a locker room -apodyterium- in which the niches are preserved as wardrobe -loculi-. Through two doors, you can access the cold room -frigidarium- in which there is a small pool -natatio-, or the warm room -tepidarium-, and from this to the hot room -caldarium-, where there was also a hot water tub, in a room that functioned as a sauna -sudity-. There were latrines accessible from the frigidarium and from the lobby on the east side of the baths.

== Water supply ==
Located in an immense plain in the center of the fluvial basins of the rivers Riguel and Arba de Luesia, from its beginnings, the city of Los Bañales had to solve, by means of cisterns and springs now mostly vanished, how to obtain a water supply. But its growth or the loss of the original aquifers led to the construction of a hydraulic system, unparalleled in the Roman world, which would provide the volume of water necessary to cover all the city's needs. Judging by the marks attested in some of the ashlars of the pillars of the aqueduct alluding to the Legio IIII Macedonica that participated in the construction between 9 and 5 a. C of the road between Caesaraugusta and Pompelo -together with Legio VI Victrix and Legio X Gemina-, one could date the construction of the aqueduct on those same dates, coinciding with what would be the first monumental takeoff of the city. In April 2015, within the program of the First Roman Weekend in Los Bañales, two new audiovisuals dedicated to the hydraulic system of the city were presented. The first one was a report directed by the young Aragonese filmmaker Álvaro Bonet y el segundo, una recreación infográfica realizada en Blender por Pablo Serrano and the second one, an infographic recreation made in Blender by Pablo Serrano, of which fragments also appear in the first of the audiovisuals.

=== The elevated section of the aqueduct: the great pillars ===
The aqueduct is one of the most outstanding elements of the archaeological site of Los Bañales. It is a work, which, despite its apparent coarseness, is a key example of Roman aqueducts in Spain due to its constructive system. It extends from Puy Foradado - a name suggesting that it was drilled for the passage of water - saving a small depression of about 350 m, resting on a rocky ridge, partly elevated on pillars and in other points for a channel carved into the rock itself -specus-, to access the city of Los Bañales at some point yet to be determined.

In this elevated part of the aqueduct, 32 of the more than 70 pillars that it was supposed to have are conserved, built with sandstone ashlars from the area, in variable number and thickness in each pillar, depending on the necessary height, placed dry one on another and ingeniously supported on the stratum of sandstones that emerges in the area and in which the foundation boxes needed to balance each pillar on the ground were worked. The upper ashlar of each pillar has a "U" -shaped recess that would serve to support the lintel that would hold the channel -or pipe- that would transport the water and about 90 cm from the crowning of each pillar a horizontal perforation appears from side to side that would allow there to be a system of propping for the support of the lintel in the center of the span between each two pillars.

The elevated section of this aqueduct was complemented by sections of specimens carved into the rock itself - some meters of this system have been found-, taking advantage of the slope of some hills, maintaining the necessary level and with the appropriate slope for the continuity of the water transit. Taking into account the dimensions to which the different elements of the route are located, it has been calculated that the entire aqueduct maintained a constant slope of less than 0.1% a meter of difference for each kilometer of travel, which makes a difference of height between pillars of a few millimeters. There is a local legend that attributes the construction of the aqueduct to the Devil.

A young woman who supposedly lived in Los Bañales, tired of hauling water from the river, makes a pact with the Devil to build an aqueduct that brings water to her home before the rooster crows the next day contributing her soul to change, but when next to the dawn of the next day the Devil is placing the last stone of his work, the girl brings a lamp to the rooster, who believing that it is already day, sings and makes the Devil give up thinking that he could not get his task, getting the girl in that way and after placing the last stone, his precious aqueduct without loss of his soul.

— Popular legend

=== The dam ===
The oral tradition attributes the origin of the water that arrived at Los Bañales, based exclusively on the collective memory, to the Fountain of the Devil of Malpica de Arba, but until now this data has not been confirmed, and the measurements of height made in most of 9 km. -in a straight line- of travel between this place and the Roman city makes it hardly viable, which suggests that the source of supply -caput aquae- lies elsewhere. For this reason, and taking into account some notes of previous archaeological campaigns that cited a possible dam in the place called Cubalmena, recent work has shown its existence, which would little more than 2 km. from the center of the current site, although it is already in the municipality of Biota.

The structure discovered is most likely a Roman dam, although it currently serves as a separation wall between two plots of culture at different heights. But excavation along the entirety of what would be its front downstream reveals a wall 53m in length. It is in the form of an arch and was made with blocks placed in staggered courses and supported on its two ends on two rocky outcrops, where it would prop up to resist the thrust of the body of water. Work has been carried out on the upper part of the dike that confirms that it was built on a bed of clay that, in addition to supporting, served to waterproof it.

Taking into account the size of the dike, an approximate height of 3m. and the extension of the water canvas according to the orography of the superior farm, it has been calculated that it could contain some 30,000 m3 of water. It would be the water coming from a spring that has now disappeared - but which still persists in the memory of the people and which makes the current land especially fertile, as well as the rainwater that would be collected from the nearby hills by the small ravines that converge on that same plot.

From this dam and the surrounding - or horadando- the hill of Puy Foradado, the water outlet would look for the valley in the direction of the city and would link with the elevated section of the aqueduct, although at the moment the starting point is not known, nor the route that would link these two structures.

The hydraulic system

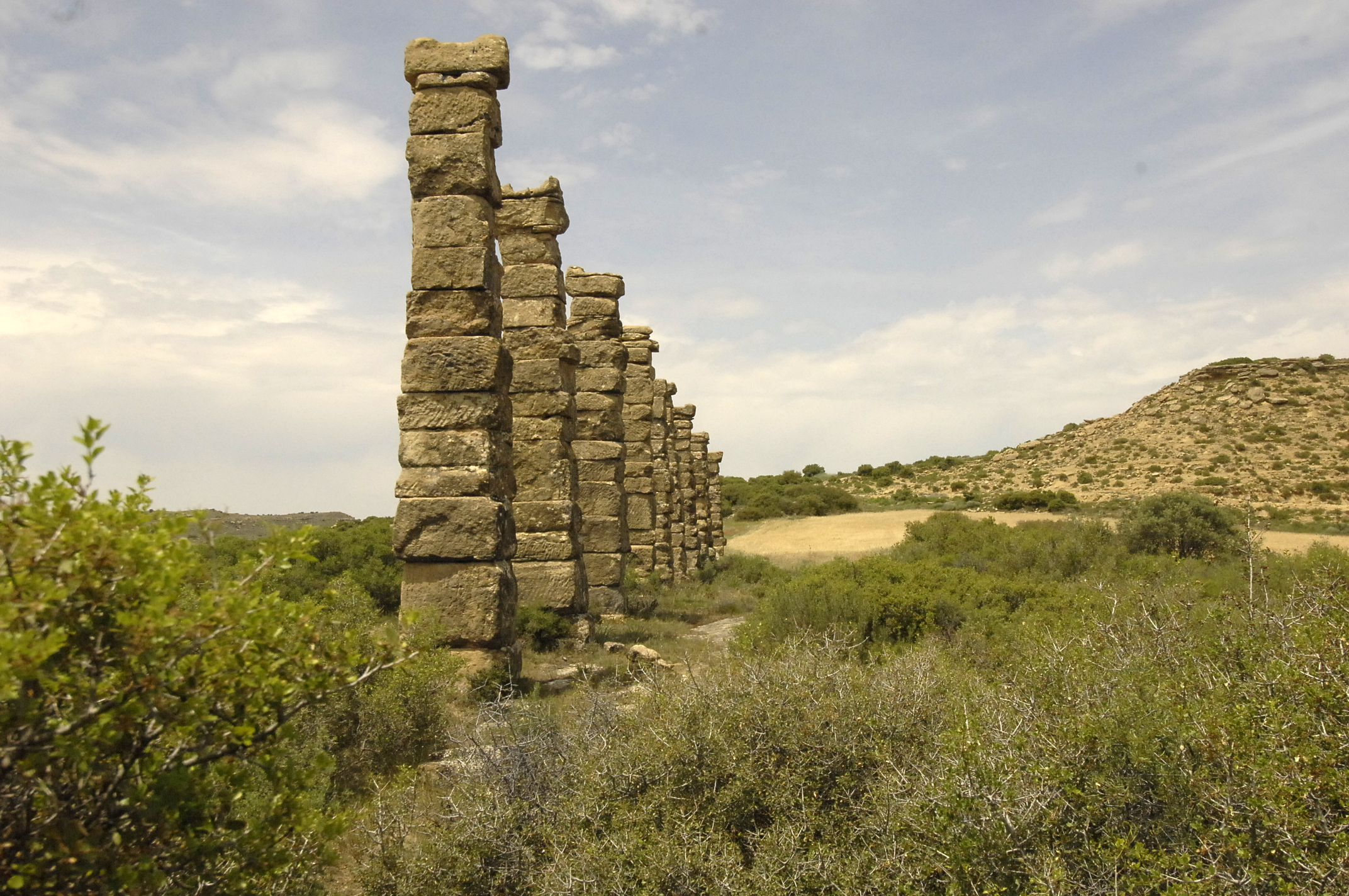
Some of the aqueduct’s pillars

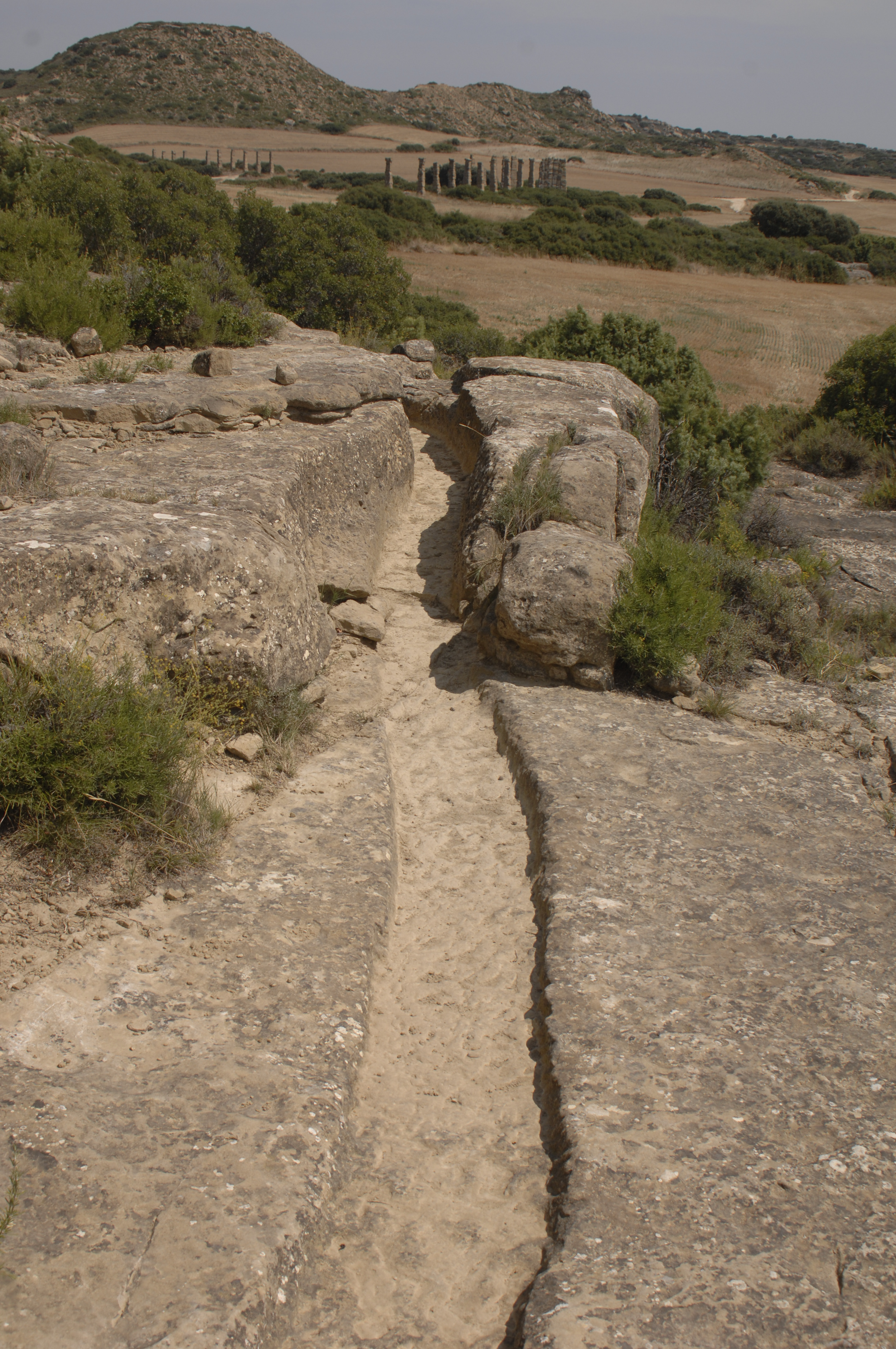
A specus of the aqueduct, with pillars in the background.

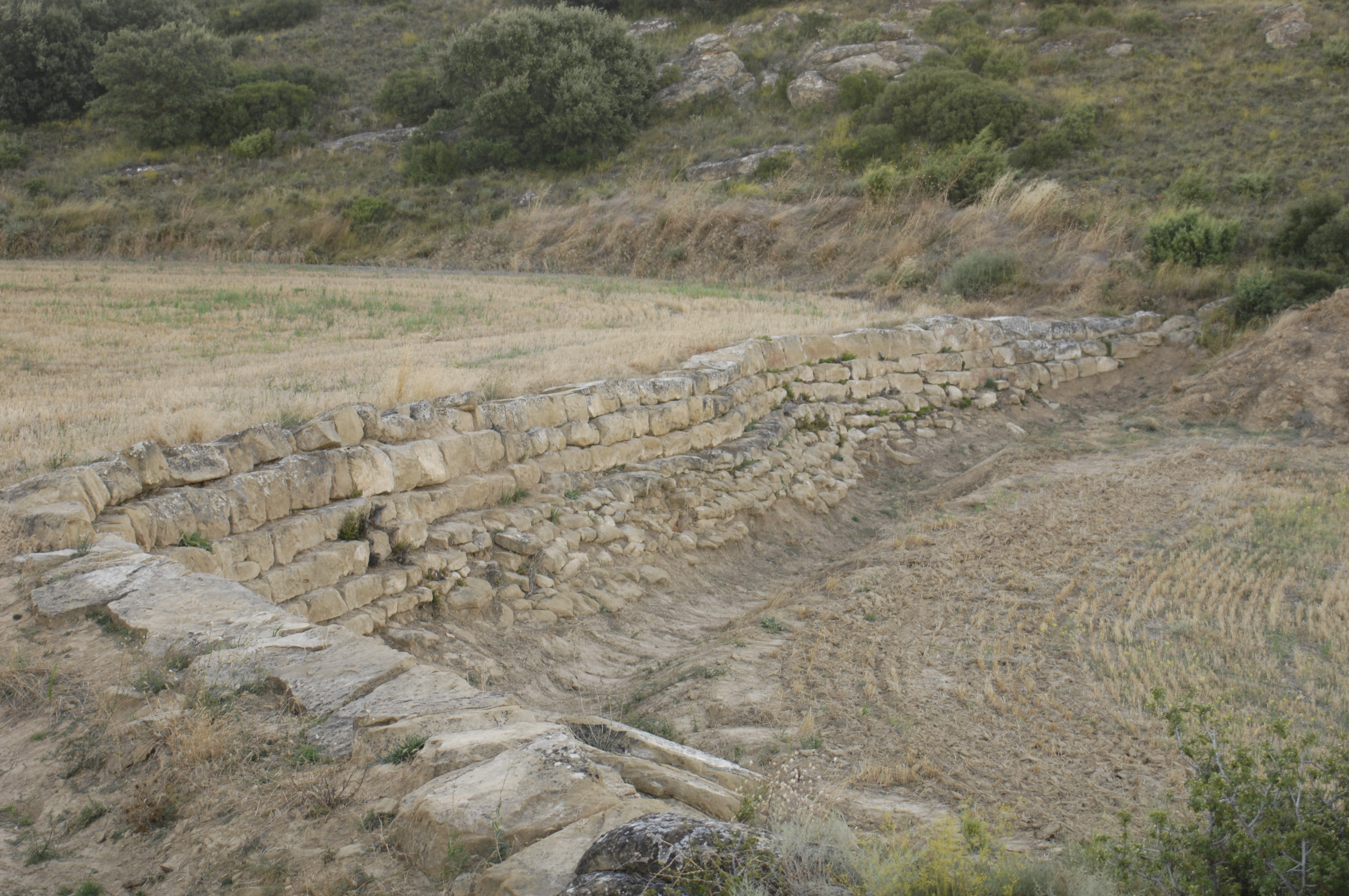
The dam of Cubalmena - Biota

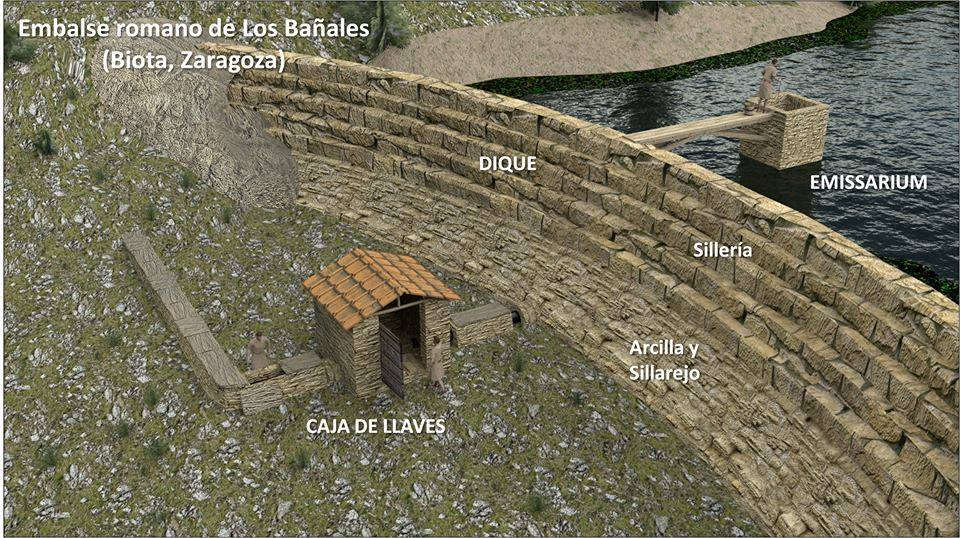
Recreation of the dam at Cubalmena

== Residential, craft, and commercial areas ==
There are several areas in the city of Los Bañales, with structures that are identified as residential and/or commercial areas, both in Roman times and at other times in their history.

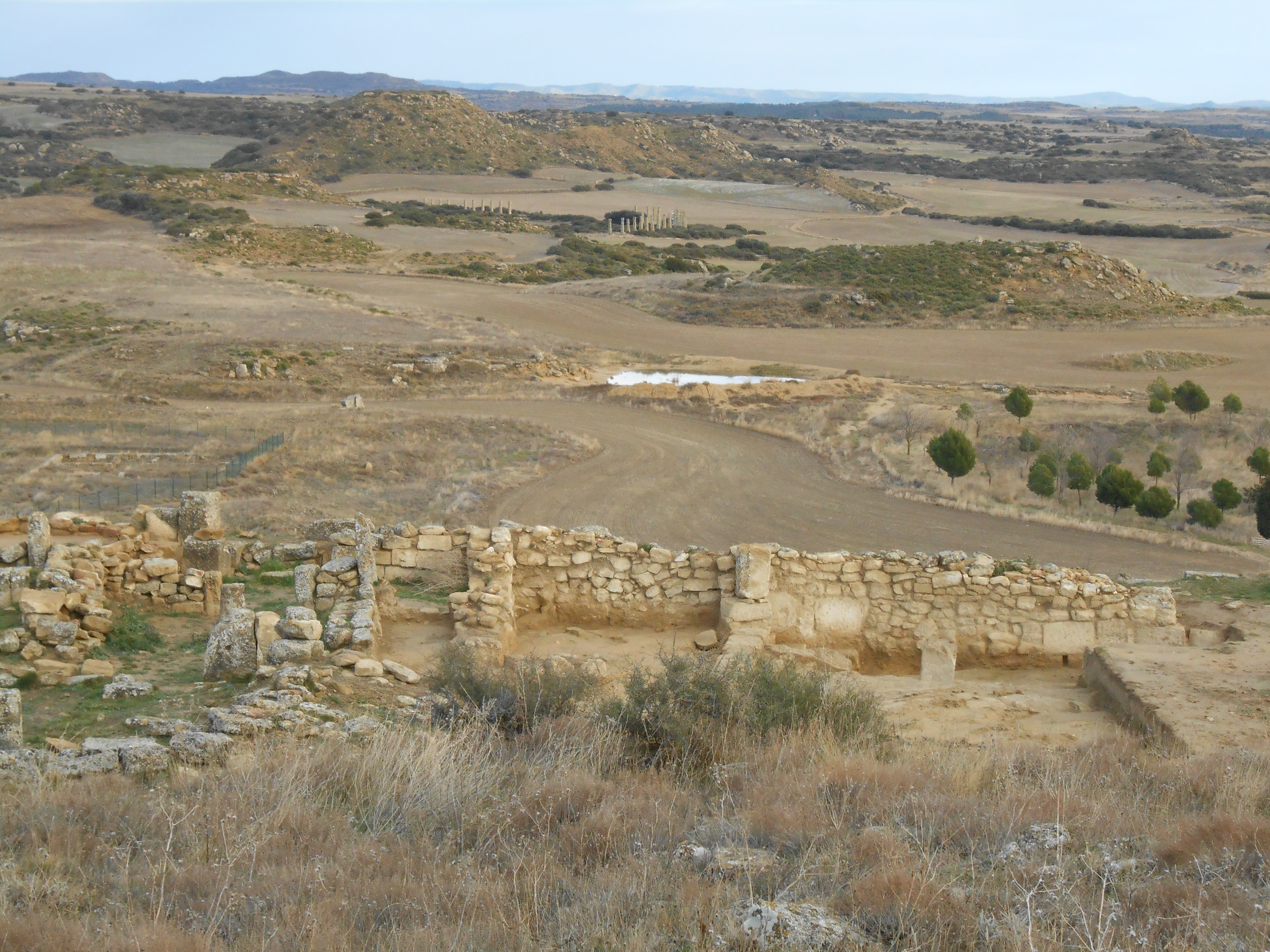
Domestic structures on El Pueyo and a view of the valley.

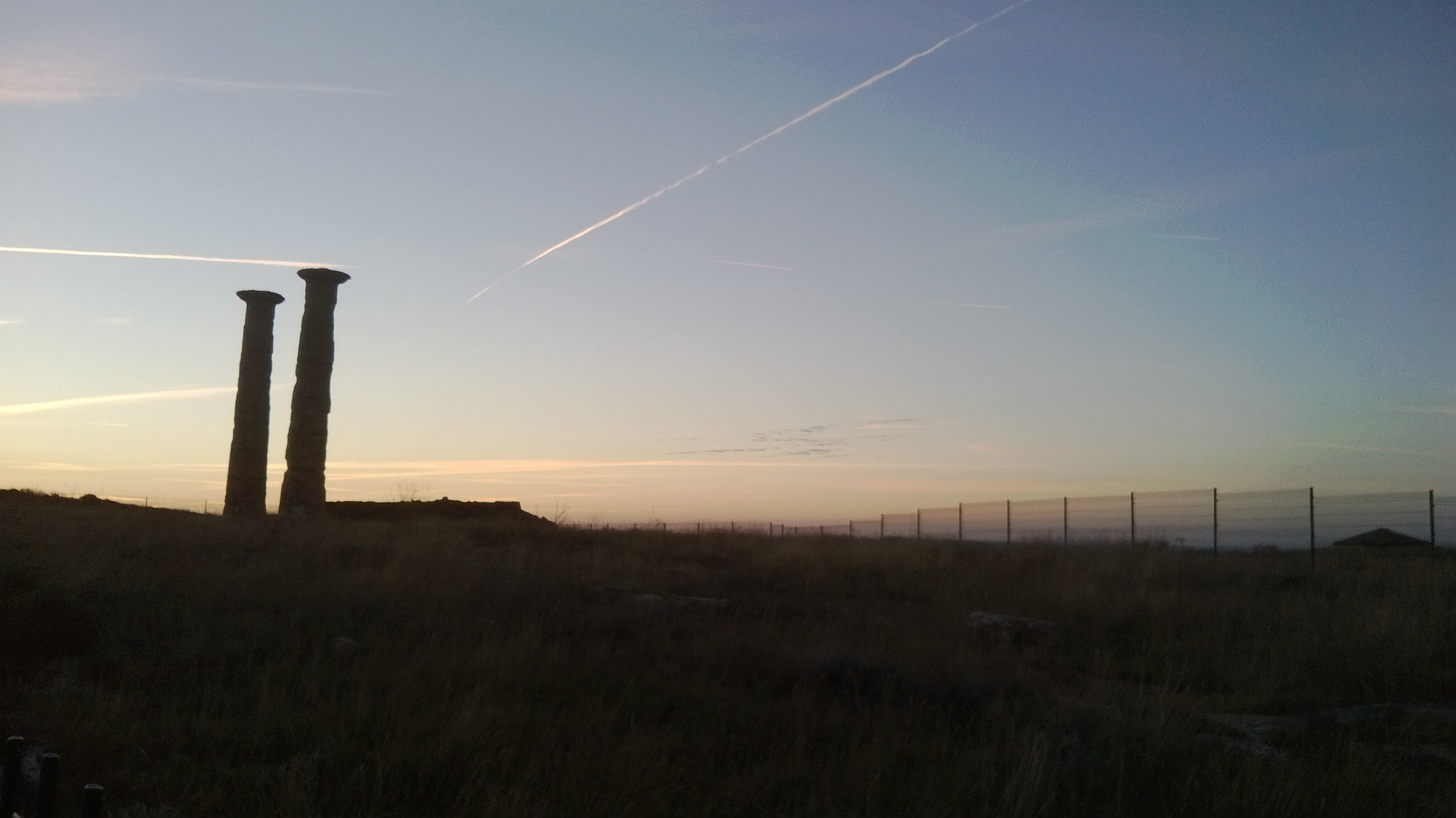
Dawn over the arcaded street

=== Domestic craft area ===
Next to the thermal baths, a plot that had not been previously unexplored was excavated between 2009 and 2012. This work yielded an artisanal and industrial space, built using other monumental-looking spaces, possibly for public use, and reusing architectural materials from other constructions. They observed in this space, both residential-type buildings as well as others that seemed to be industrial. Ovens or storage areas suggested that this area may contain houses with craft workshops. This is backed by the fact that the team found a lot of objects made of bone. It is possible that it was a store -tabernae- dedicated to the manufacture and sale of such products.

=== The arcaded street ===
The first thing that is found by the visitor who comes to Los Bañales through the town of Layana is two colossal Tuscan columns. For decades, this was mistakenly considered to be a possible access to the forum of the city or part of a market-macellum-, but, in reality, these two columns - and others of which only its base is conserved - formed part of a portico located at the crossroads of two streets. In fact, part of the sidewalks are conserved - in one of whose angles a monumental dwelling was located, which probably belonged to the local elite. This house has a central peristyle to which the main rooms were opened, of which parts of the stone plinth are preserved, on which the different walls would be supported. Alongside this area, the remains of a staircase that would lead to another area located on a lower terrace, currently a growing area, are also preserved. All this area was excavated for the last time and very partially, in the 1970s, and partially again in 2017.

=== The houses of El Pueyo ===
El Pueyo was completely occupied by houses of the pre-Roman era, and today you can intuit, observing from a high point, the different blocks of houses -insulae -. In the facades of these houses, which in some cases had to have low commercial tabernae-, you can see well-squared and large blocks located in key areas of the building, while the dividing sockets of the interior were made with hewn stones and perpendicular orthostats to give greater consistency to the wall. It's atypical structure for the Roman model suggests that they are houses adapted to the different periods of survival of the population in this area of the city, from centuries before acculturation with Rome and until centuries after the dismantling of the public structures of the Roman city. Excavated by José Galiay and documented again by Antonio Beltrán, a part of the second mentioned terrace, is currently under study again, since in recent excavations a section of the wall that surrounded this terrace was discovered, with the base of one of its towers and even the doorway of a wall.

== The necropolis ==
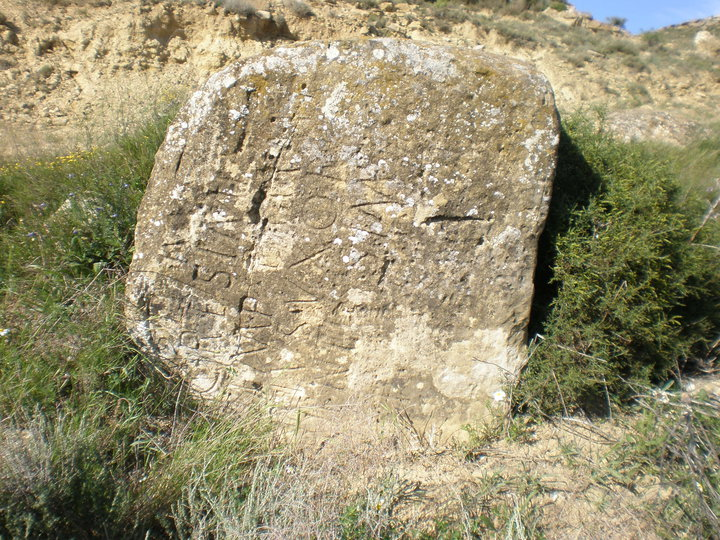
Cupa in the necropolis dedicated to Chresima by Sempronius Paramithius.

Like any Roman city, Los Bañales had its own necropolis. Its remains have been identified to the southwest of what would have been the urban nucleus.

As a result of the archaeological surveys – excavation has not yet taken place – the necropolis has yielded quadrangular and triangular-headed steles, funerary altars, pedestals, and especially cupae.

The cupae -in Latin, singular cupa, plural cupae- is a peculiar type of funerary monument of an elongated plant with cylindrical cover, imitating a tumbled barrel -in fact, cupa means tonel in Latin-, which were used in some regions of the Roman Empire between the 1st and 3rd centuries and which was exceptionally frequent in this area. Under their barrel shape, they had a hole in which an urn was inserted with the ashes of the deceased. They also had side holes so that the relatives could make offerings and libations, and on one of the sides, a commemorative inscription would have been carved. The cupae were not only frequent in the necropolis of Los Bañales but also in the villas of the elite. The findings have been increasing in recent years, since the beginning of the revision of the rural territory in 2009. The most recent occurred in the summer of 2015.

== Funerary monuments ==
Under the protection of the city of Los Bañales and not far from the passing road, some of the estates of the local elite had their own funerary areas in the surroundings of their luxurious homes.

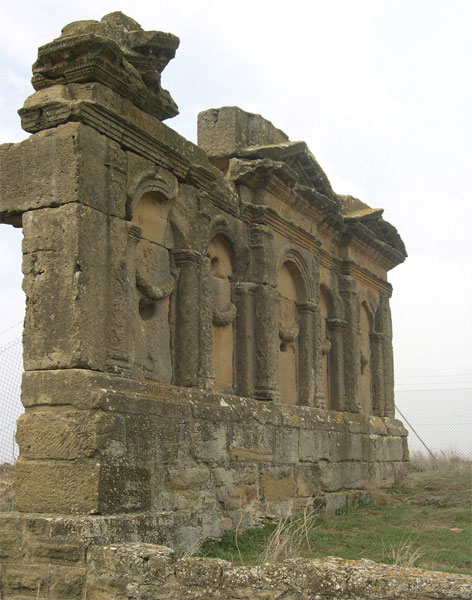
The Mausoleum of the Atilii north side.

Mausoleum of the Atilii - popularly called the altar of the Moors Its inscriptions indicate that a woman named Atilia Festa built it, in life, for her grandfather Gaius Atilius Genialis, for her father Lucius Atilius Festus, and for herself. This facade is one of the ornamental jewels of Roman funerary art in the Iberian Peninsula. In January 2016, Pablo Serrano, an infographics artist of the Los Bañales project, carried out a 3D reconstruction of the monument based on detailed photogrammetric documentation and comparison with similar monuments and Roman funerary culture. This reconstruction is hosted on the Los Bañales video channel.

Mausoleum of the Sádaba Synagogue A Roman mausoleum made of opus mixtum, with rigging made of ashlar and brick, a cruciform plan with two exedras appended to the sides, and unequal arms. The monument follows architectural parallels from the Constantinian era, 4th century CE., similar to Sant Miquel de Egara (Tarrasa) or Centcelles (Constantí, Tarragona). It was likely associated with a sumptuous villa, of which some remains are preserved a few meters from the mausoleum. On April 17, 2015, the Geometric Documentation of Heritage Laboratory (LDGP) of the University of the Basque Country presented an exhaustive work on the remains of this mausoleum, documenting its state of conservation at that time and making its results public for future studies or restoration work.

== Rural settlement ==
In spite of the intense urbanization that the area registered in Roman times, the region's ancient cities survived, above all, on agrarian activity. Cereal, oil, wine, esparto, wood, livestock products, also sandstone must have been the primary products of this territory. The area was very well irrigated by the waters of the rivers Riguel and Arba de Luesia and was crossed, in addition, by a road that connected the Ebro Valley with the Bay of Biscay and the Pyrenees and an extensive network of secondary roads. The local elite, which had large farms, maintained an active relationship with the city, using it as a market for its products and as a source of workers. There were large rural districts annexed to the city -uici- where different groups of artisans were located. Somewhat more distant and strategically located were the villas, sumptuous farms that took advantage of the resources of their surrounding area and in some cases had important facilities such as baths or cemeteries. In the summer of 2013, the City Council of Layana, with the advice of the Uncastillo Foundation, inaugurated an innovative Interpretation Center on the rural Roman landscape called De Agri Cultura. This interpretive space is located in the medieval tower of the 11th century that presides over the hamlet of the municipality. It is a space that allows visitors to get an idea of the productive systems, economic life, and peasant society of the Roman era in the vicinity of Los Bañales.

== See also ==
- List of Bienes de Interés Cultural in the Province of Zaragoza
