= Doliana =

Doliana (Greek: Δολιανά) may refer to several places in Greece:

- Ano Doliana, a village in the Arcadia regional unit
- Kato Doliana, a village in the Arcadia regional unit
- Doliana, Arcadia, a municipality in the Arcadia regional unit
- Doliana, Ioannina, a village in the Ioannina regional unit
