= Quinaria =

A quinaria (plural: quinariae) is a Roman unit of area, roughly equal to 4.2 square centimetres (0.65 in^{2}). Its primary use was to measure the cross-sectional area of pipes in Roman water distribution systems. A "one quinaria" pipe is 2.31 centimetres (0.91 in) in diameter.

In Roman times, there was considerable ambiguity regarding the origin of the name, and the actual value of a quinaria. According to Frontinus:

...Those who refer (the quinaria) to Vitruvius and the plumbers, declare that it was so named from the fact that a flat sheet of lead 5 digits wide, made up into a round pipe, forms this ajutage. But this is indefinite, because the plate, when made up into a round shape, will be extended on the exterior surface and contracted on the interior surface. The most probable explanation is that the quinaria received its name from having a diameter of 5/4 of a digit...

In other words, Vitruvius claimed that the name was derived from a pipe created from a flat sheet of lead "5 digits wide", roughly 9.25 centimetres (3.64 in), but Frontinus contested the definitiveness of this because the exterior circumference of the resulting pipe would be larger than the interior circumference. According to Frontinus, the name and value is derived from a pipe having a diameter of "5/4 of a digit". Using Vitruvius' standard, the value of a quinaria is 6.81 square centimetres (1.056 sq in), and the resulting pipe would have a diameter of 2.94 centimetres (1.16 in).

== Use as a unit of discharge ==
Although dimensionally a unit of area, the quinaria's principal use was as the unit in which Roman administrators expressed and allocated the discharge (rate of flow) of water. In De aquaeductu (c. AD 98), the water commissioner Frontius states the capacity of each of Rome's aqueducts, and of every grant of water from them, in quinariae: he reports the measured cross-section of the Aqua Appia as equivalent to 1,825 quinariae, and the combined capacity of the city's aqueducts as 14,018 quinariae. Because Roman practice had no means of measuring the velocity of flowing water, the cross-sectional area of a standardised orifice served as a proxy for the rate of flow through it — a usage that is dimensionally incorrect, since discharge has dimensions of volume per unit time. The proxy was made administrable by regulating the delivery nozzle (calix): a stamped bronze ajutage of prescribed bore and a minimum length of twelve digits, fitted where a private pipe joined a distribution tank (castellum), and required to be set level and perpendicular to the tank wall, since a calix tilted downward or set against the current drew more water than its nominal rating. Frontinus was aware that velocity affected the quantity delivered, noting that a swift current "increases the quantity by its very velocity", but made no quantitative measurements of it.

Modern attempts to convert the quinaria to volumetric units are necessarily approximate. A widely cited estimate holds that a pipe of one quinaria delivered roughly 40 cubic metres per day under typical operating conditions, but because the actual discharge depended on head and velocity, which Roman gauging did not record, scholars have concluded that no exact modern equivalent can be recovered.

The importance of this measure was that water taxes in ancient Rome were based on the size of the supply pipe.

== See also ==
- Ancient Roman weights and measures
- Water theft#Roman period
