= Tulio Ramírez Padilla =

Venezuelan Roman Catholic bishop (1960–2026)

The Most Reverend Tulio Ramírez Padilla
- Bishop of Guarenas
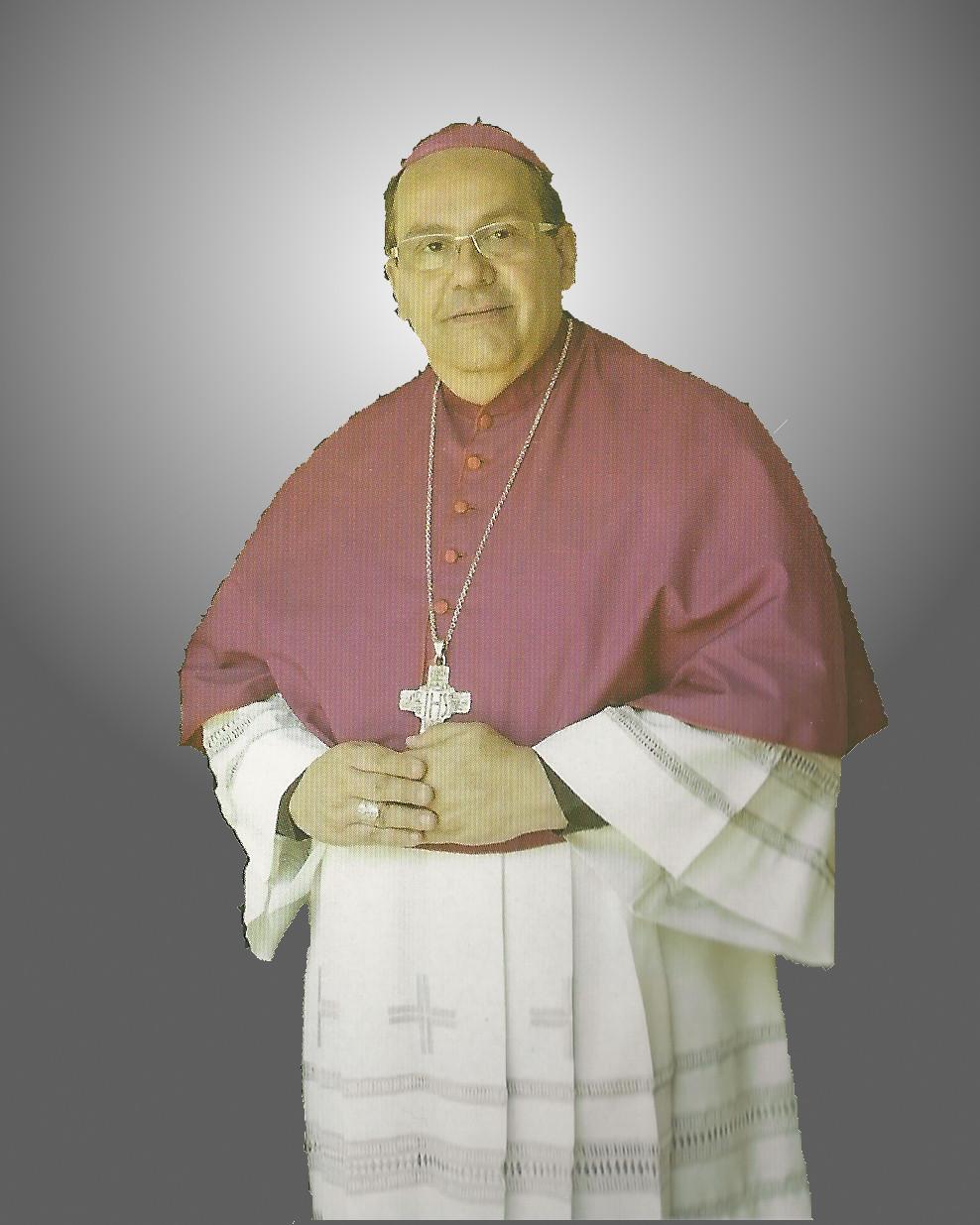
- Church: Catholic Church
- Archdiocese: Caracas
- Diocese: Guarenas
- Appointed: 11 December 2020
- Installed: 6 February 2021
- Term ended: 12 August 2026
- Predecessor: Gustavo García Naranjo
- Successor: Vacant
- Other posts: Titular bishop of Ausuccura and Auxiliary Bishop of Caracas (2012–2020)

Orders
- Ordination: 5 August 1984 by José Ali Lebrún Moratinos
- Consecration: 8 July 2012 by Jorge Liberato Urosa Savino, Diego Rafael Padrón Sánchez and Reinaldo del Prette Lissot

Personal details
- Born: 28 February 1960 Caracas, Venezuela
- Died: 12 August 2026 (aged 66) Caracas, Venezuela
- Education: Pontifical Gregorian University
- Motto: Servire Ecclesiam Christi
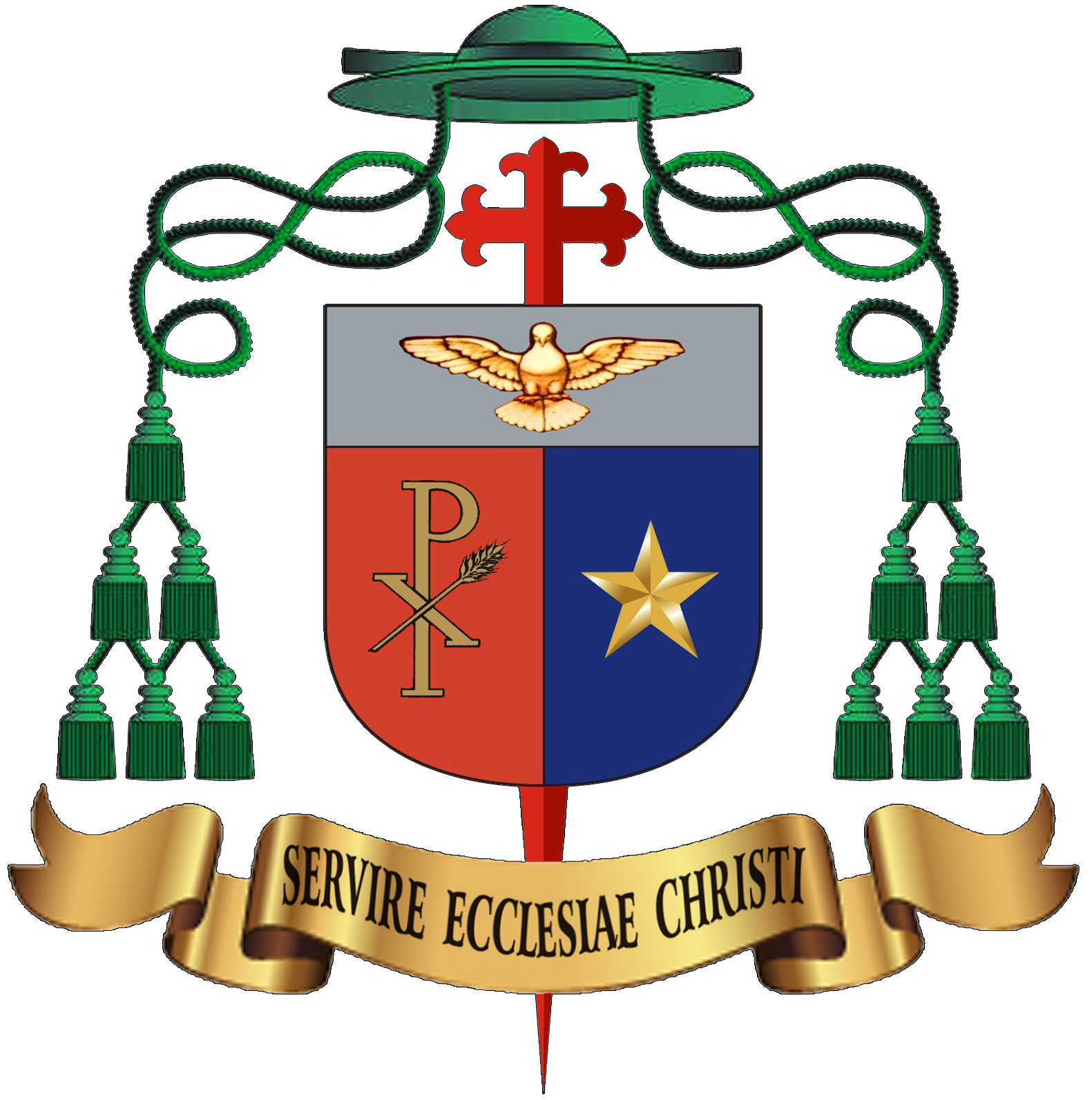
- Coat of arms

Styles of Tulio Ramírez Padilla
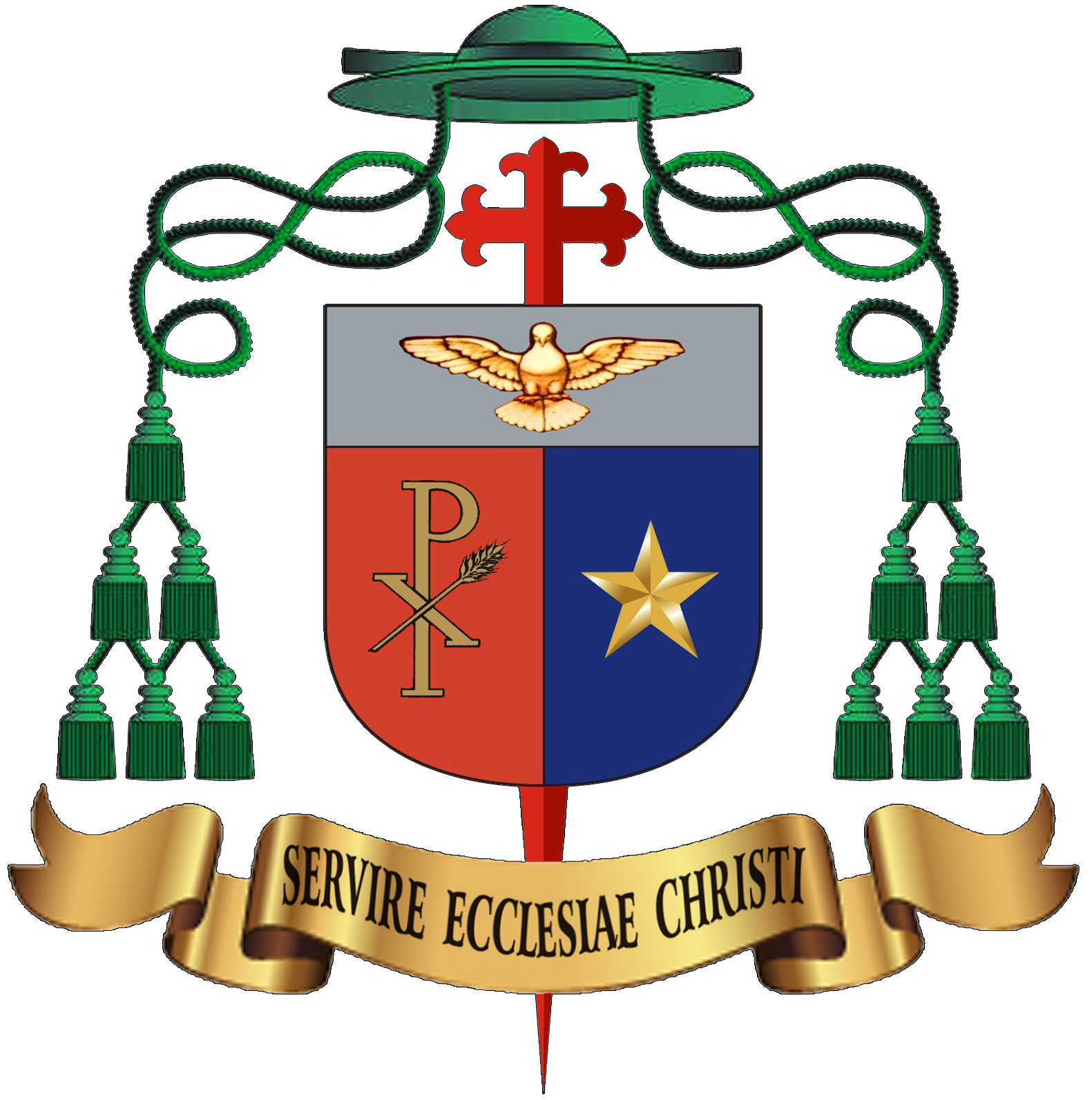
- Reference style: His Excellency; The Most Reverend
- Spoken style: Your Excellency
- Religious style: Bishop

Tulio Luis Ramírez Padilla (28 February 1960 – 12 August 2026) was a Venezuelan Roman Catholic prelate who served as the Bishop of Guarenas from 2020 until his death in 2026. He previously served as an auxiliary bishop of the Archdiocese of Caracas and as titular bishop of Ausuccura from 2012 to 2020.

== Early life and education ==
Ramírez Padilla was born in Caracas, Venezuela, on 28 February 1960. He studied philosophy at the Interdiocesan Major Seminary of Caracas and theology at the Seminario Mayor San Ildefonso de Toledo in Toledo, Spain. He subsequently obtained a licentiate in canon law from the Pontifical Gregorian University in Rome.

He was ordained a priest on 5 August 1984 for the Archdiocese of Valencia in Venezuela. His early pastoral assignments included serving as parochial vicar of San Agustín in Guacara, and parish priest of Nuestra Señora del Carmen in Miranda, San Diego de Alcalá in San Diego, Nuestra Señora de Begoña in Naguanagua, and again San Agustín in Guacara. He also served as a professor at the major seminary, a judge of the archdiocesan ecclesiastical tribunal, and later as vicar general and moderator of the curia of the Archdiocese of Valencia in Venezuela.

== Episcopate ==
On 4 April 2012, Pope Benedict XVI appointed Ramírez Padilla auxiliary bishop of Caracas and titular bishop of Ausuccura. He received his episcopal consecration on 8 July 2012.

On 11 December 2020, Pope Francis appointed him Bishop of Guarenas, succeeding Gustavo García Naranjo. He was installed as the second diocesan bishop of Guarenas on 6 February 2021.

During his episcopate in Guarenas, Ramírez Padilla was particularly associated with the cause for the beatification of Venezuelan physician José Gregorio Hernández. He served as vice-postulator of the cause and was also credited by the Diocese of Guarenas with promoting the approval of the canonical coronation of the diocese's patroness.

== Death ==
Ramírez Padilla died on 12 August 2026, at the age of 66. L'Osservatore Romano reported that he died in the morning at a hospital in Caracas, where he had been hospitalized earlier that month because of a serious illness.

His funeral was scheduled for 14 August, at a church in Guatire, within the Diocese of Guarenas.

Catholic Church titles
Preceded by Gustavo García Naranjo	Bishop of Guarenas; 2020–2026	Succeeded by Vacant
Preceded by Juan Vicente Córdoba Villota	Titular Bishop of Ausuccura; 2012–2020	Succeeded by Lizardo Estrada Herrera
Preceded by —	Auxiliary Bishop of Caracas; 2012–2020	Succeeded by —
