= Ricardo Aldo Barreto Cairo =

Venezuelan Roman Catholic bishop (born 1968)

- Bishop of Valle de la Pascua
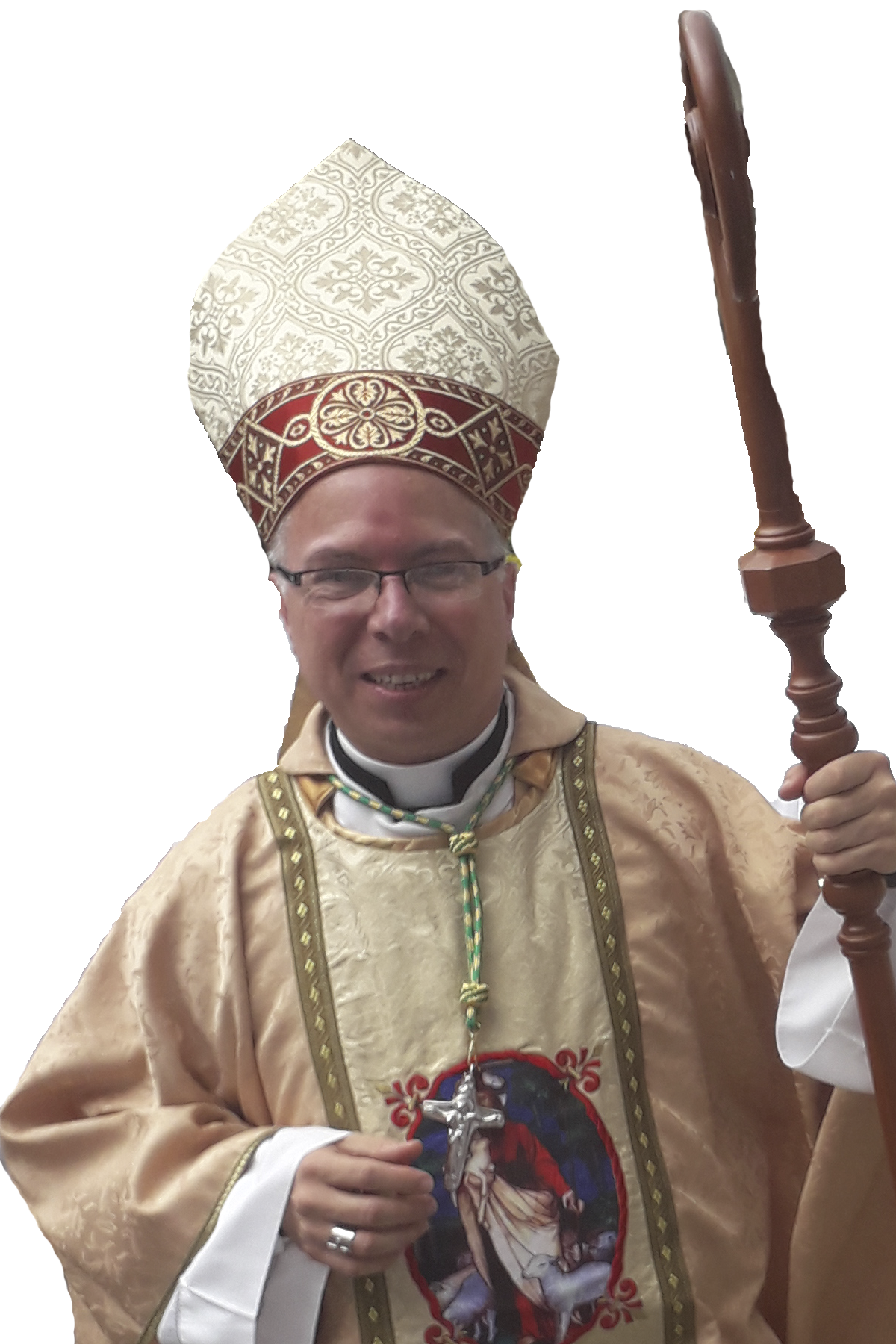
- Church: Catholic Church
- Province: Calabozo
- Diocese: Valle de la Pascua
- Appointed: 11 January 2024
- Predecessor: Ramón José Aponte Fernández
- Other posts: Titular Bishop of Badiae (2019–2024); Auxiliary Bishop of Caracas (2019–2024)

Orders
- Ordination: 15 August 1998 by Francisco de Guruceaga Iturriza
- Consecration: 23 November 2019 by Baltazar Enrique Porras Cardozo

Personal details
- Born: Ricardo Aldo Barreto Cairo; 7 July 1968 (age 57) Panama City, Panama
- Residence: Valle de la Pascua
- Education: Santa Rosa Catholic University, Pontifical University of the Holy Cross, Instituto Universitario Pedagógico Monseñor Rafael Arias Blanco
- Motto: Sequere me

Ricardo Aldo Barreto Cairo (born 7 July 1968) is a Panamanian-born Venezuelan Roman Catholic prelate, who has served as the Bishop of the Diocese of Valle de la Pascua since 11 January 2024. He previously served as the Auxiliary Bishop of the Archdiocese of Caracas and Titular Bishop of Badiae from 2019 to 2024.

== Biography ==
=== Early life and education ===
Ricardo Aldo Barreto Cairo was born on 7 July 1968, in Panama City, Panama. He later moved to Venezuela, eventually obtaining Venezuelan citizenship in 1985.

He completed his ecclesiastical studies in Philosophy and Theology at the Major Seminary of La Guaira. He later earned a Licentiate in Theology from the Santa Rosa Catholic University in Caracas and a Licentiate in Moral Theology from the Pontifical University of the Holy Cross in Rome. Furthermore, he obtained the title of Professor in Special Education from the Instituto Universitario Pedagógico Monseñor Rafael Arias Blanco in Caracas.

=== Priesthood ===
He was ordained a priest on 15 August 1998, incardinated in the Diocese of La Guaira. During his ministry, he served as the Parish Priest of Nuestra Señora de la Candelaria in Tarmas, a formator at the Major Seminary of La Guaira, and eventually the Rector of the same seminary from 2014 to 2019. He also served as the President of the Organization of Seminaries of Venezuela (OSVEN).

=== Episcopate ===
On 17 September 2019, Pope Francis appointed him Auxiliary Bishop of Caracas and Titular Bishop of Badiae. He received his episcopal consecration on 23 November 2019, with Cardinal Baltazar Enrique Porras Cardozo serving as the principal consecrator, and Bishop Fernando José Castro Aguayo and Bishop Raúl Biord Castillo as co-consecrators.

On 11 January 2024, Pope Francis appointed him Bishop of the Diocese of Valle de la Pascua, succeeding Bishop Ramón José Aponte Fernández.
