= Jorge Liberato Urosa Savino =

Cardinal of the Catholic Church (1942–2021)

His Eminence Jorge Urosa Savino
- Cardinal; Archbishop Emeritus of Caracas
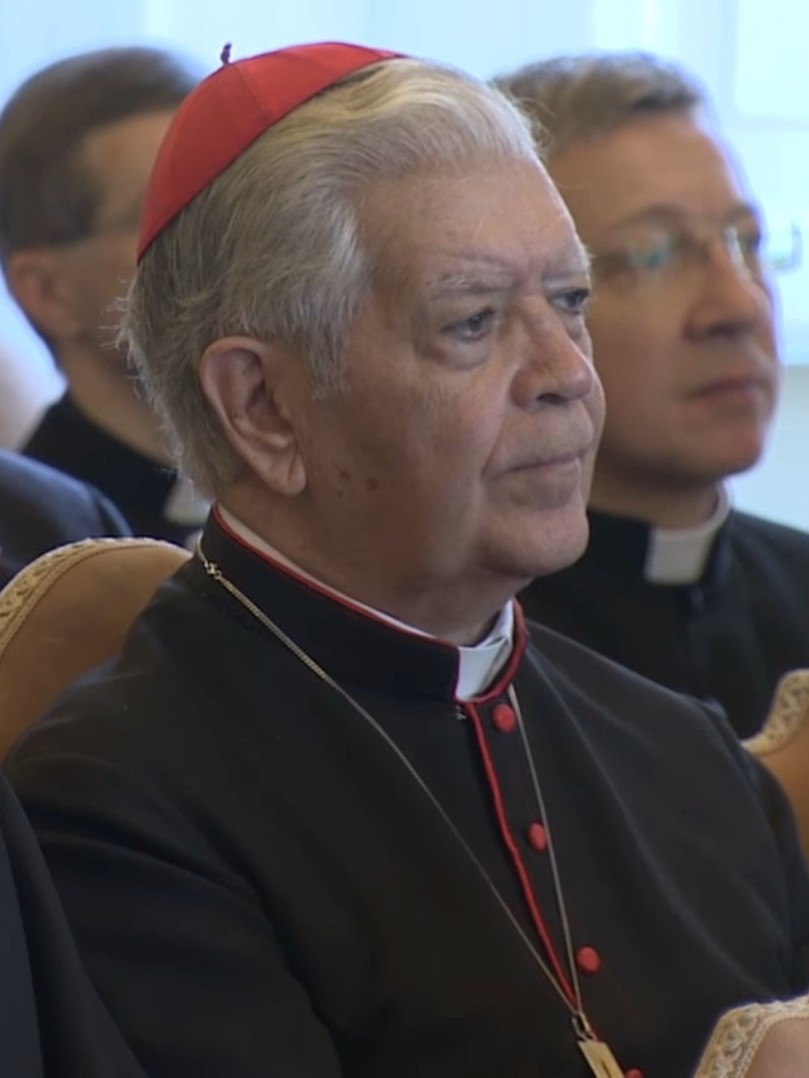
- Archdiocese: Caracas
- Diocese: Caracas
- Appointed: 19 September 2005
- Installed: 5 November 2005
- Term ended: 9 July 2018
- Predecessor: Ignacio Velasco S.D.B.
- Successor: Baltazar Enrique Porras Cardozo
- Other post: Cardinal-Priest of Santa Maria al Monti (2006-21)
- Previous posts: Auxiliary Bishop of Caracas (1982-90); Titular Bishop of Vegesela in Byzacena (1982–90); Archbishop of Valencia (1990–05)

Orders
- Ordination: 15 August 1967 by José Humberto Quintero Parra
- Consecration: 22 September 1982 by José Lebrún Moratinos
- Created cardinal: 24 March 2006 by Pope Benedict XVI
- Rank: Cardinal-Priest

Personal details
- Born: Jorge Liberato Urosa Savino; 28 August 1942 Caracas, Venezuela
- Died: 23 September 2021 (aged 79) Caracas, Venezuela
- Denomination: Roman Catholic
- Education: Colegio De La Salle Tienda Honda; Interdiocesan Seminary of Caracas; St. Augustine's Seminary, Toronto; Pontifical Gregorian University
- Motto: Pro Mundi Vita
- Coat of arms: Jorge Urosa Savino's coat of arms

Styles of Jorge Urosa Savino
- Reference style: His Eminence
- Spoken style: Your Eminence
- Informal style: Cardinal
- See: Caracas

Jorge Liberato Urosa Savino (28 August 1942 – 23 September 2021) was a Venezuelan prelate of the Catholic Church.

He was auxiliary bishop of Caracas from 1982 to 1990, Archbishop of Valencia from 1990 to 2005, and Archbishop of Caracas from 2005 to 2018. He was made a cardinal in 2006.

== Biography ==
=== Early life and ordination ===
Jorge Urosa was born in Caracas to Luis Manuel Urosa Joud and Ligia Savino del Castillo de Urosa. He studied humanities at Colegio De La Salle Tienda Honda, and philosophy at the Interdiocesan Seminary of Caracas. From 1962 to 1965, he studied theology at St. Augustine's Seminary in Toronto, Ontario, Canada.

Urosa then attended the Pontifical Gregorian University in Rome, where he obtained his doctorate in dogmatic theology, until 1971. During his time at the Gregorian, he returned to Caracas to be ordained to the priesthood by Cardinal José Quintero Parra on 15 August 1967.

=== Professor ===
After concluding his Roman studies at the Pius Latin American Pontifical College, Urosa served as a professor and the rector of the Seminary San José in Caracas. He later served as rector of the Interdiocesan Seminary in Caracas as well. Before becoming vicar general of the Archdiocese of Caracas, he was President of the Organization of Latin American Seminaries and founded a parochial vicariate in a chabolas neighborhood of Caracas.

Ordination history of Jorge Liberato Urosa Savino
History
Episcopal consecration
- Consecrated by: José Lebrún Moratinos (Caracas)
- Date: 22 September 1982
Episcopal succession
Bishops consecrated by Jorge Liberato Urosa Savino as principal consecrator
- Reinaldo del Prette Lissot: 5 February 1994
- José Valero Ruz: 27 June 1998
- Luis Tineo Rivera: 28 April 2007
- Jesús de Zarate Salas: 12 January 2008

=== Bishop ===
On 6 July 1982, Urosa was appointed Auxiliary Bishop of Caracas and Titular Bishop of Vegesela in Byzacena by Pope John Paul II. He received his episcopal consecration on the following 22 September from Archbishop José Lebrún Moratinos, with Archbishops Domingo Roa Pérez and Miguel Salas Salas CIM serving as co-consecrators. Urosa was named Archbishop of Valencia on 16 March 1990, and Archbishop of Caracas on 19 September 2005.

He was elected as the second Vice-President of the Venezuelan Episcopal Conference on 10 January 2006.

=== Cardinal ===
Pope Benedict XVI created him Cardinal-Priest of Santa Maria ai Monti in the consistory of 24 March 2006. Urosa was the fifth member of the College of Cardinals from Venezuela.

Besides his native Spanish, he spoke English, Italian, French, and Latin.

As of October 2011, he was the Honorary President of the Venezuelan Episcopal Conference.

He was one of the cardinal electors who participated in the 2013 papal conclave that elected Pope Francis.

Pope Francis accepted his resignation as archbishop on 9 July 2018.

Urosa rejected the creation of the Reformed Catholic Church in Venezuela, whose representatives were introduced in July 2008, as in line with the socialism of President Hugo Chávez. He called the group "an irregular association".

Urosa and his auxiliary bishops warned against using the mass for political purposes and declared that the mass at which a blessing was given to the President-elect of Paraguay, former bishop Fernando Lugo, was not authorized by the archdiocese.

== Illness and death ==
On 27 August 2021, Urosa was admitted to a clinic in Caracas and diagnosed with COVID-19. He received the sacrament of the sick before being transferred to the intensive care unit and placed on a ventilator. On 3 September 2021, the Caracas archdiocese denied rumours circulating in the media that the cardinal had died but said the cardinal's health was in a delicate but stable condition and he was receiving all the necessary medical interventions in the intensive care ward. On 12 September, the archdiocese said the cardinal's health had deteriorated and he was in very delicate health. Cardinal Urosa died from the virus on 23 September 2021, after being hospitalized for a month.

Catholic Church titles
Preceded by Alfredo Torres Romero	— TITULAR — Titular Bishop of Vegesela in Byzacena; 3 July 1982 – 16 March 1990	Succeeded by Segundo René Coba Galarza
Preceded by Luis Henríquez Jiménez	Archbishop of Valencia; 16 March 1990 – 19 September 2005	Succeeded by Reinaldo del Prette Lissot
Preceded by Ignacio Velasco	Archbishop of Caracas; 19 September 2005 – 9 July 2018	Succeeded by Baltazar Enrique Porras Cardozo
Preceded by Jaime Lachica Sin	Cardinal-Priest of Santa Maria ai Monti; 24 March 2006 – 23 September 2021	Succeeded by Jean-Marc Aveline
