= San Pedro Cathedral =

San Pedro Cathedral may refer to:

- St. Peter the Apostle Cathedral, Cali, Colombia
- Jaca Cathedral, Spain
- St. Peter the Apostle Cathedral, La Guaira, Venezuela
- Davao Cathedral, Philippines
- Riobamba Cathedral, Ecuador

== See also ==
- San Pedro (disambiguation)
- Saint Peter (disambiguation)
- St. Peter's Church (disambiguation)
