= Rafael Ramón Conde Alfonzo =

Venezuelan priest (1943–2020)

- Bishop of Maracay
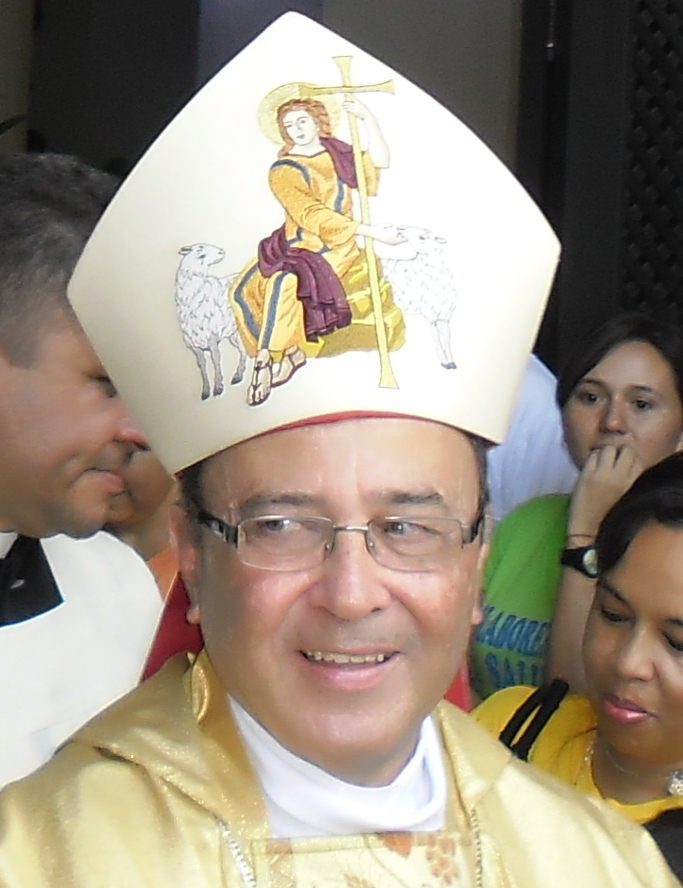
- Conde Alfonzo in 2013
- Church: Catholic Church
- Diocese: Diocese of Maracay
- In office: 12 February 2008 – 19 July 2019
- Predecessor: Reinaldo del Prette Lissot
- Successor: Enrique José Parravano Marino
- Previous posts: Bishop of Margarita (1999-2008); Coadjutor Bishop of La Guaira (2001-2011); Titular Bishop of Bapara (1995-1997); Auxiliary Bishop of Caracas (1995-1997)

Orders
- Ordination: 8 December 1968 by José Humberto Quintero Parra
- Consecration: 6 January 1996 by Pope John Paul II

Personal details
- Born: 13 July 1943 Caracas, United States of Venezuela
- Died: 10 December 2020 (aged 77) Maracay, Aragua, Venezuela

Rafael Ramón Conde Alfonzo (13 July 1943 – 10 December 2020) was a Venezuelan Roman Catholic bishop.

Conde Alfonzo was born in Venezuela and ordained to the priesthood in 1968. He served as titular bishop of Bapara and as auxiliary bishop of the Roman Catholic Archdiocese of Caracas from 1995 to 1997 and as coadjutor bishop of the Roman Catholic Diocese of La Guaira from 1997 to 1999. He then served as bishop of the Roman Catholic Diocese of Margarita from 1999 to 2008 and as bishop of the Roman Catholic Diocese of Maracay from 2008 to 2009.

He died at the age of 77 on 10 December 2020 after suffering from Pancreatic cancer.
