= José Sótero Valero Ruz =

Venezuelan Roman Catholic bishop

- Bishop of Guanare
- Church: Catholic Church
- Diocese: Diocese of Guanare
- In office: 19 March 2001 – 12 October 2011
- Predecessor: Alejandro Figueroa Medina
- Successor: José de la Trinidad Valera
- Previous posts: Titular Bishop of Alba (1998-2001); Auxiliary Bishop of Valencia in Venezuela (1998-2001)

Orders
- Ordination: 16 May 1964
- Consecration: 27 June 1998 by Jorge Liberato Urosa Savino

Personal details
- Born: 22 April 1936 Timotes (northwest of Santo Domingo), Mérida, United States of Venezuela
- Died: 29 June 2012 (aged 76)

José Sótero Valero Ruz (22 April 1936 – 29 June 2012) was a Roman Catholic bishop of the Roman Catholic Diocese of Guanare, Venezuela.

Ordained to the priesthood in 1966, Valero Ruz was named bishop in 1998 and resigned in 2011.
