= Vegesela =

Vegesela may refer to the following places and jurisdictions in Roman North Africa:

- Vegesela in Byzacena
- Vegesela in Numidia
