= Diocese of Valle de la Pascua =

Latin Catholic diocese in Venezuela

Diocese of Valle de la Pascua Dioecesis Vallispaschalensis

Catholic

Location
- Country: Venezuela
- Ecclesiastical province: Calabozo

Statistics
- Area: 37,900 km^{2} (14,600 sq mi)
- Population: Total; Catholics: (as of 2004); 360,000; 352,000 (97.8%)

Information
- Denomination: Catholic Church
- Sui iuris church: Latin Church
- Rite: Roman Rite
- Established: 25 July 1992 (34 years ago)
- Cathedral: Our Lady of Candelaria Cathedral, Valle de la Pascua

Current leadership
- Pope: Leo XIV
- Bishop: Ricardo Barreto Cairo
- Bishops emeritus: Ramón Aponte Fernández

Map

The Diocese of Valle de la Pascua (Latin: Dioecesis Vallispaschalensis) is a Latin Church diocese of the Catholic Church located in the city of Valle de la Pascua. It is a suffragan diocese in the ecclesiastical province of the metropolitan Archdiocese of Calabozo in Venezuela.

== History ==
The diocese was established as the Diocese of Valle de la Pascua, split from the Diocese of Calabozo on 25 July 1992.

== Ordinaries ==
- Joaquín José Morón Hidalgo (25 July 1992 – 27 December 2002)
- Ramón José Aponte Fernández (5 March 2004 – 11 January 2024)
- Ricardo Aldo Barreto Cairo (11 January 2024 -); previously he was titular bishop of Badie and auxiliary bishop of the archdiocese of Caracas, having been ordained on 23 November 2019.

== See also ==
- Catholic Church in Venezuela
