= Pedro Nicolás Bermúdez Villamizar =

Venezuelan Roman Catholic prelate (1029–2022)

His Excellency Pedro Nicolás Bermúdez Villamizar, C.I.M.
- Bishop Emeritus of Caracas
- Archdiocese: Caracas
- Appointed: 15 February 1997
- Term ended: 17 January 2009
- Other post: Titular Bishop of Lamsorti (1997–2022)

Orders
- Ordination: 15 August 1953
- Consecration: 19 April 1997 by Antonio Ignacio Velasco Garcia

Personal details
- Born: 8 June 1929 Rubio, Venezuela
- Died: 27 October 2022 (aged 93) Caracas, Venezuela

Pedro Nicolás Bermúdez Villamizar, C.I.M. (8 June 1929 – 27 October 2022) was a Venezuelan Roman Catholic prelate.

== Biography ==
Bermúdez Villamizar was born in Venezuela and was ordained to the priesthood in 1953. He served as titular bishop of Lamsorti and auxiliary bishop of the Archdiocese of Caracas from 1997 until his retirement in 2009.

Catholic Church titles
Preceded by —	Auxiliary Bishop of Caracas; 1997–2009	Succeeded by —
Preceded by Jacques Berthelet	Titular Bishop of Lamsorti; 1997–2022	Succeeded by Vacant
