= Bapara =

Bapara may refer to:

- Bapara, Mauritania, an ancient city and former bishopric, now a Latin Catholic titular see
- Bapara (moth), a genus of moths
