= Diocese of Petare =

Roman Catholic diocese in Venezuela

Diocese of Petare Dioecesis Petarensis

Location
- Country: Venezuela
- Ecclesiastical province: Caracas

Statistics
- Area: 177 km^{2} (68 sq mi)
- Population: Total: (as of 2021); 760,000
- Parishes: 23

Information
- Rite: Latin Rite
- Established: 16 November 2021 (3 years ago)
- Cathedral: Cathedral of the Sweet Name of Jesus in Petare

Current leadership
- Pope: Leo XIV
- Bishop: Juan Carlos Bravo Salazar

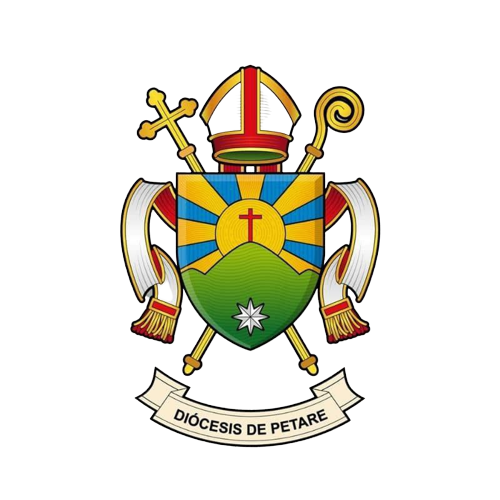
Coat of Arm of the Diocese of Petare

The Roman Catholic Diocese of Petare (Latin: Dioecesis Petarensis) is a diocese located in the city of Petare in the ecclesiastical province of Caracas in Venezuela.

The diocese covers an area of the civil department of the municipality of Sucre, Miranda, and is made up of five civil parishes hitherto belonging to the metropolitan archdiocese of Caracas. It's divided into 23 parishes, having 57 priests and 5 seminarians all together as per 2021.

== History ==
On 16 November 2021, Pope Francis established the Diocese of Petare, when it was split off from the Roman Catholic Archdiocese of Caracas.

== Ordinaries ==
- Juan Carlos Bravo Salazar (since 16 November 2021)

== See also ==
- Roman Catholicism in Venezuela
