= Baltazar Enrique Porras Cardozo =

Venezuelan prelate

His Eminence Baltazar Enrique Porras Cardozo
- Cardinal, Metropolitan Archbishop Emeritus of Caracas
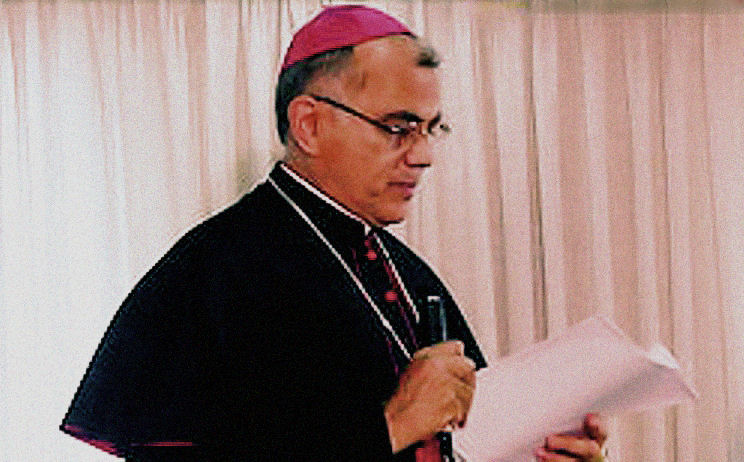
- Church: Roman Catholic Church
- Archdiocese: Caracas
- See: Caracas
- Appointed: 9 July 2018 (apostolic administrator)
- Installed: 17 January 2023
- Term ended: 28 June 2024
- Predecessor: Jorge Liberato Urosa Savino
- Successor: Raúl Biord Castillo
- Other post: Cardinal-Priest of Santi Giovanni Evangelista e Petronio (2016–)
- Previous posts: Auxiliary Bishop of Mérida (1983–1991); Titular Bishop of Lamida (1983–91); Metropolitan Archbishop of Mérida (1991–2023); Apostolic Administrator of San Cristóbal de Venezuela (1998–99); President of the Venezuelan Episcopal Conference (1999–2006); Vice-President of the Latin American Episcopal Conference (2007–11); Apostolic Administrator of Caracas (2018–2023)

Orders
- Ordination: 30 July 1967 by Miguel Antonio Salas Salas
- Consecration: 17 September 1983 by José Lebrún Moratinos
- Created cardinal: 19 November 2016 by Pope Francis
- Rank: Cardinal-Priest

Personal details
- Born: 10 October 1944 (age 82) Caracas, Venezuela
- Motto: In Nomine Tuo (In Your name)
- Coat of arms: Baltazar Enrique Porras Cardozo's coat of arms

Ordination history of Baltazar Enrique Porras Cardozo
History
Episcopal consecration
- Principal consecrator: José Alí Lebrún Moratinos
- Co-consecrators: Miguel Antonio Salas Salas, CIM; Domingo Roa Peréz
Cardinalate
- Elevated by: Pope Francis
Episcopal succession
Bishops consecrated by Baltazar Enrique Porras Cardozo as principal consecrator
- Juan Maria Leonardi Villasmil: 8 April 1994
- Jesús Alfonso Guerrero Contreras, OFM Cap.: 20 January 1996
- Ramiro Diaz Sánchez, OMI: 26 April 1997
- Luis Alfonso Márquez Molina, CIM: 12 January 2002
- Ramon José Viloria Pinzon, SOD: 7 February 2004
- Alfredo Enrique Torres Rondón: 13 September 2012
- Raúl Biord Castillo: 8 February 2014
- Juan de Dios Peña Rojas: 4 July 2015

Styles of Baltazar Enrique Porras Cardozo
- Reference style: His Eminence
- Spoken style: Your Eminence
- Religious style: Cardinal
- Informal style: Cardinal

Baltazar Enrique Porras Cardozo (Spanish pronunciation: [baltaˈsaɾ enˈri.ke ˈporas kaɾˈðoso]; born 10 October 1944) is a Venezuelan Catholic retired prelate who served as Archbishop of Caracas from 2023 to 2024. He previously served there as apostolic administrator from 2018 to 2023. Cardozo served as an auxiliary bishop for the Archdiocese of Mérida from 1983 to 1991 and as Archbishop of Mérida from 1991 to 2023. Pope Francis made him a cardinal in 2016.

== Life ==
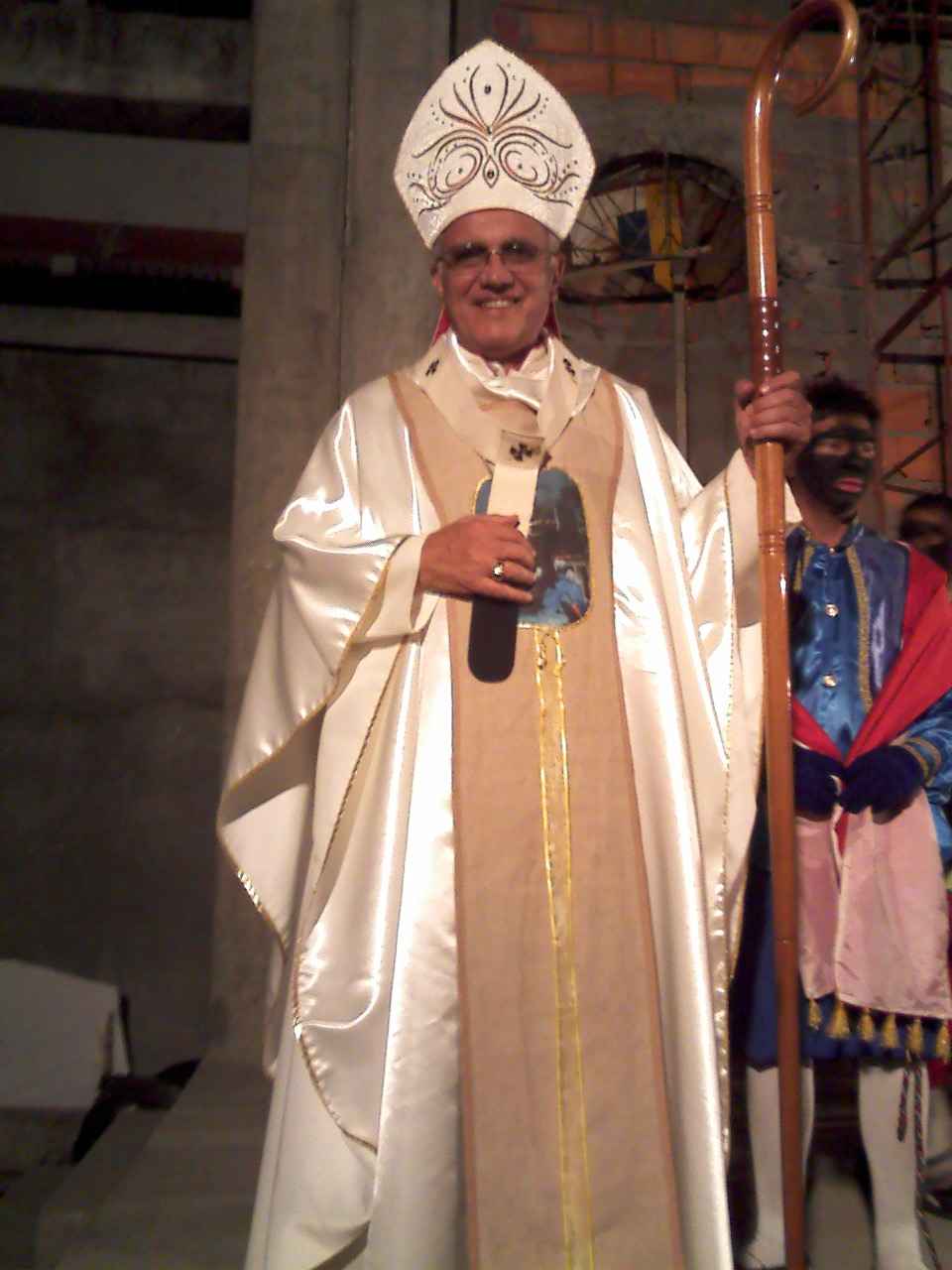
Monsignor Porras in 2010.

Baltazar Enrique Porras Cardozo was born on 10 October 1944 in Caracas. He attended Colegio Fray Luis de León and St. Teresa parish school. He studied philosophy at the Saint Rose of Lima Interdiocesan Seminary in Caracas. He earned a licentiate in theology and a doctorate in pastoral theology at the Pontifical University of Salamanca in Spain.

He was ordained to the priesthood on 30 July 1967 by Miguel Antonio Salas Salas. He was appointed Auxiliary Bishop of Mérida on 23 July 1983 and received his episcopal consecration on 17 September 1983 from Cardinal José Lebrún Moratinos. He was appointed Metropolitan Archbishop of Mérida on 31 October 1991 and was installed there on 5 December.

He served as apostolic administrator of the Diocese of San Cristóbal from 2 March 1998 to 8 June 1999.

He was president of the Venezuelan Episcopal Conference from 1999 to 2006. Within the Episcopal Conference of Latin America (CELAM), he was president of the Department of the Laity from 1995 to 1999 and of the Department of Communication from 2003 to 2007. He served as the organization's first vice president from 2007 to 2011.

Pope Francis announced on 9 October 2016 that he would make him a cardinal at a consistory on 19 November 2016. At that consistory Porras was named Cardinal-Priest of Santi Giovanni Evangelista e Petronio.

Francis made him a member of the Dicastery for the Laity, Family and Life on 23 December 2017. In September 2019, Pope Francis named him one of the three cardinals to serve as presidents of the Synod for the Amazon.

Pope Francis named him Apostolic Administrator of the Metropolitan Archdiocese of Caracas on 9 July 2018. He was named a member of the Pontifical Council for Culture on 11 November 2019.

Pope Francis appointed him Metropolitan Archbishop of Caracas on 17 January 2023.

On August 24, 2024, he was appointed by Pope Francis as the Pontifical Legate for the 53rd International Eucharistic Congress to be held in Quito, Ecuador.

== See also ==
- Cardinals created by Pope Francis
- Catholic Church in Venezuela

Catholic Church titles
Preceded by Miguel Antonio Salas Salas	Archbishop of Merida; 30 October 1991 – 17 January 2023	Succeeded by Helizandro Terán Bermúdez
Preceded by Giacomo Biffi	Cardinal-Priest of Santi Giovanni Evangelista e Petronio; 19 November 2016 –	Incumbent
New title	Apostolic Administrator of Caracas; 2018 – 2023	
Preceded by Jorge Liberato Urosa Savino	Archbishop of Caracas; 17 January 2023 – 28 June 2024	Succeeded by Raúl Biord Castillo
