= Our Lady of Candelaria Cathedral, Valle de la Pascua =

Coordinates: 9.21272°N 66.00380°W

Our Lady of Candelaria Cathedral
- Catedral de Nuestra Señora de la Candelaria de Valle de la Pascua
- Our Lady of Candelaria Cathedral
- Location: Valle de la Pascua
- Country: Venezuela
- Denomination: Roman Catholic Church

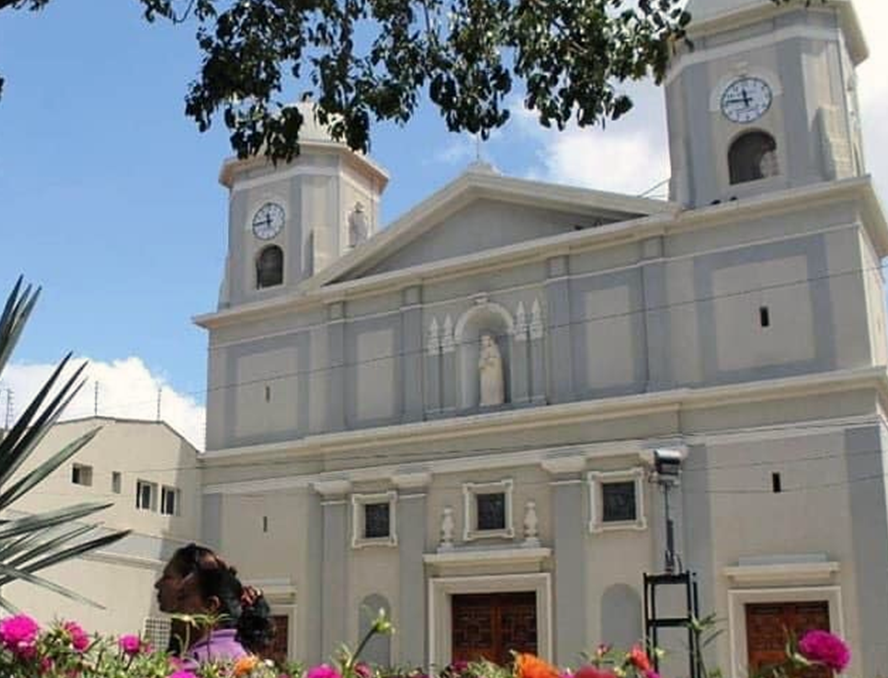

The Our Lady of Candelaria Cathedral (Spanish: Catedral de Nuestra Señora de la Candelaria de Valle de la Pascua) or simply Cathedral of Valle de la Pascua, is a religious building belonging to the Catholic Church and is located in the central and historic center between Atarraya and Guasco streets in front of the Bolívar Square of the city of Valle de la Pascua, in the Leonardo Infante municipality in the state of Guárico in the central plains of the South American country of Venezuela.

The cathedral follows the Roman or Latin rite and functions as the headquarters of the Diocese of Valle de la Pascua (Dioecesis Vallispaschalensis) is a suffragan of the Archdiocese of Calabozo (Archidioecesis Calabocensis). It is under the pastoral responsibility of the Bishop Ramón José Aponte Fernández.

The current baroque building dates from 1955 and replaced a building with previous French influence.

== See also ==
- List of cathedrals in Venezuela
- Our Lady of Candelaria
- Roman Catholicism in Venezuela
