= Our Lady of the Assumption Cathedral, Maracay =

Our Lady of the Assumption Cathedral
- Catedral de Nuestra Señora de la Asunción
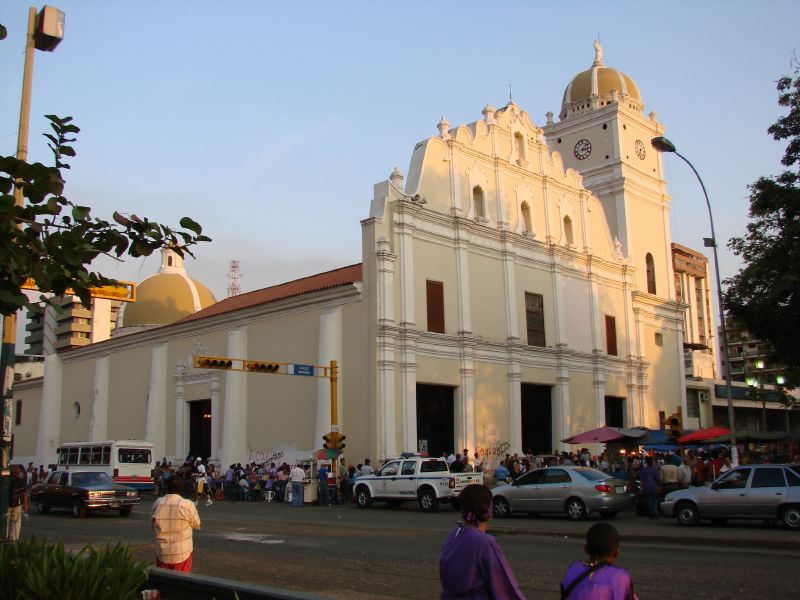
- Our Lady of the Assumption Cathedral
- Location: Maracay
- Country: Venezuela
- Denomination: Roman Catholic Church

Administration
- Diocese: Roman Catholic Diocese of Maracay

The Our Lady of the Assumption Cathedral (Spanish: Catedral de Nuestra Señora de la Asunción de Maracay) also called Cathedral of Maracay is a Catholic religious building located in the city of Maracay, Aragua state in Venezuela. It is the episcopal seat of the Catholic Diocese of Maracay, unlike other cathedrals in Venezuelan cities that are facing a Plaza Bolivar, the Cathedral of Maracay is located opposite the Plaza Girardot, which was established to honor a local hero.

When it was created it began as the "Church of Maracay" built on the grounds of the Marquis de Mijares in the late seventeenth century and its first pastor was Francisco Pérez Estopiñán in 1701. Its present appearance is the result of numerous modifications through history city. Follow the Roman or Latin rite and is the headquarters of the Latin diocese of Maracay (Dioecesis Maracayensis).

It should not be confused with another Catholic cathedral dedicated to the same Marian devotion in the same city but located in San Jacinto and used by the Catholic Syriac rite (also under authority of the Pope in Rome).

== See also ==
- List of cathedrals in Venezuela
- Our Lady of the Assumption Church (disambiguation)
- Roman Catholicism in Venezuela
