= Diocese of Guarenas =

Roman Catholic diocese in Venezuela

Diocese of Guarenas Dioecesis Guarenensis

Catholic

Location
- Country: Venezuela
- Ecclesiastical province: Caracas

Statistics
- Area: 5,186 km^{2} (2,002 sq mi)
- Population: Total; Catholics: (as of 2004); 550,895; 523,857 (95.1%)

Information
- Denomination: Catholic Church
- Rite: Latin Rite
- Established: 30 November 1996 (29 years ago)
- Cathedral: Catedral Nuestra Señora de Copacabana

Current leadership
- Pope: Leo XIV
- Bishop: Vacant
- Bishops emeritus: Gustavo García Naranjo

The Roman Catholic Diocese of Guarenas (Latin: Guarenen(sis)) is a diocese located in the city of Guarenas in the ecclesiastical province of Caracas in Venezuela.

== History ==
On 30 November 1996 Pope John Paul II established the Diocese of Guarenas from the Diocese of Los Teques.

== Ordinaries ==
- Gustavo García Naranjo (30 November 1996 – 11 December 2020)
- Tulio Luis Ramírez Padilla (11 December 2020 – 12 August 2026)

== See also ==
- Roman Catholicism in Venezuela
