= Diocese of Maracay =

Roman Catholic diocese in Venezuela

Diocese of Maracay Dioecesis Maracayensis

Catholic
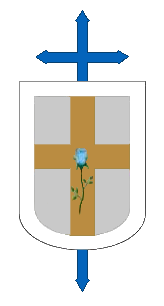

Location
- Country: Venezuela
- Ecclesiastical province: Valencia en Venezuela

Statistics
- Area: 7,014 km^{2} (2,708 sq mi)
- Population: Total; Catholics: (as of 2004); 1,588,749; 1,382,083 (87.0%)

Information
- Rite: Latin Rite
- Established: 21 June 1958 (68 years ago)
- Cathedral: Our Lady of the Assumption Cathedral

Current leadership
- Pope: Leo XIV
- Bishop: Enrique José Parravano Marino

Map

The Roman Catholic Diocese of Maracay (Latin: Dioecesis Maracayensis) is a diocese located in the city of Maracay in the ecclesiastical province of Valencia en Venezuela in Venezuela.

== History ==
On 21 June 1958 Pope Pius XII established the Diocese of Maracay from the Diocese of Calabozo and Metropolitan Archdiocese of Caracas.

== Bishops ==
=== Ordinaries ===
- José Alí Lebrún Moratinos † (21 Jun 1958 – 19 Mar 1962); Appointed, Bishop of Valencia, Venezuela; future Cardinal
- Feliciano González Ascanio † (31 Jul 1962 – 13 Dec 1986)
- José Vicente Henriquez Andueza, S.D.B. † (24 Jun 1987 – 5 Feb 2003)
- Reinaldo del Prette Lissot (5 Feb 2003 – 10 Apr 2007) Appointed, Archbishop of Valencia, Venezuela
- Rafael Ramón Conde Alfonzo † (12 Feb 2008 – 19 July 2019)
- Enrique José Parravano Marino, S.D.B.(19 July 2019 — present)

=== Coadjutor bishop ===
- Reinaldo del Prette Lissot (1997–2003)

== See also ==
- Roman Catholicism in Venezuela

== Sources ==
- GCatholic.org
- Catholic Hierarchy ^{[self-published]}
