= Vegesela in Byzacena =

Africa Proconsularis (125 AD)

Vegesela in Byzacena was a Roman Era town tentatively identified with ruins at Henchir-Recba in modern Tunisia. The town was in the Roman province of Byzacena.

The ancient town was also the seat of an ancient Christian Bishopric, which survives today as a titular see of the Roman Catholic Church. René Coba Galarza is the current Bishop. The diocese effectively ceased to function with the Muslim conquest of the Maghreb. Today the diocese of Vegesela in Byzacena (Latin: Dioecesis Vegeselitana in Byzacena) is a suppressed and titular see of the Roman Catholic Church.

There are only six documented bishops of Vegesela in Byzacena.

- Privato attended the Carthaginian council called by Grato in 349.
- The Catholic Privaziano intervened at the Carthage conference of 411, which saw together the Catholic and Donatist bishops of Roman Africa; on that occasion the headquarters did not have a Donatist bishop.
- Alfredo Torres Romero (December 30, 1967 - July 26, 1980 appointed Bishop of Toluca)
- Jorge Liberato Urosa Savino (3 July 1982 - 16 March 1990 appointed archbishop of Valencia en Venezuela)
- Segundo René Coba Galarza (June 7, 2006 - June 18, 2014)
- Franz Josef Gebert, from 31 May 2017auxiliary bishop of Trier
