= Diocese of La Guaira =

Roman Catholic diocese in Venezuela

Coordinates: 10.6012°N 66.9313°W

Diocese of La Guaira Dioecesis Guairiensis

Catholic

Location
- Country: Venezuela
- Ecclesiastical province: Caracas

Statistics
- Area: 1,497 km^{2} (578 sq mi)
- Population: Total; Catholics: (as of 2004); 325,000; 295,750 (91.0%)

Information
- Rite: Latin Rite
- Established: 15 April 1970 (56 years ago)
- Cathedral: St. Peter the Apostle Cathedral

Current leadership
- Pope: Leo XIV
- Bishop: Pablo Modesto González Pérez, S.D.B.

Map

The Roman Catholic Diocese of La Guaira (Latin: Dioecesis Guairiensis) is a diocese located in the city of La Guaira in the ecclesiastical province of Caracas in Venezuela.

== History ==
On 15 April 1970 Pope Paul VI established the Diocese of La Guaira from the Metropolitan Archdiocese of Caracas.

== Our Lady of Lourdes Pilgrimage ==
La Guaira is home to the oldest pilgrimage to Our Lady of Lourdes in Latin America. The devotion began in 1884 when a Venezuelan priest, Fr Machado, returned from a pilgrimage to the original Lourdes grotto in France. He established a shrine in the mountain of El Ávila. Every year, with only very few exceptions, a 20 Km pilgrimage takes place along the Camiño de los Españoles, beginning in Puerto Caracas and ending in the church of St Sebastian, in Maiquetía.

== Bishops ==
=== Ordinaries ===
- Marcial Augusto Ramírez Ponce (1970.04.15 – 1972.12.05), appointed Auxiliary Bishop of Caracas, Santiago de Venezuela
- Francisco de Guruceaga Iturriza (1973.10.02 – 2001.10.18)
- José de la Trinidad Valera Angulo (2001.10.18 – 2011.10.12), appointed Bishop of Guanare
- Raúl Biord Castillo, S.D.B. (2013.11.30 - 2024.07.28), appointed Archbishop of Caracas
- Pablo Modesto González Pérez, S.D.B (appointed 2025.01.09)

=== Coadjutor bishop ===
- Rafael Ramón Conde Alfonzo (1997-1999), did not succeed to see; appointed Bishop of Margarita

=== Other priest of this diocese who became bishop ===
- Ricardo Aldo Barreto Cairo, appointed Auxiliary Bishop of Caracas, Santiago de Venezuela in 2019

== See also ==
- Roman Catholicism in Venezuela
