= Santi Giovanni Evangelista e Petronio =

- Church of Saints John the Evangelist and Petronius
- Santi Giovanni e Petronio dei Bolognesi
- Chiesa dei Santi Giovanni Evangelista e Petronio
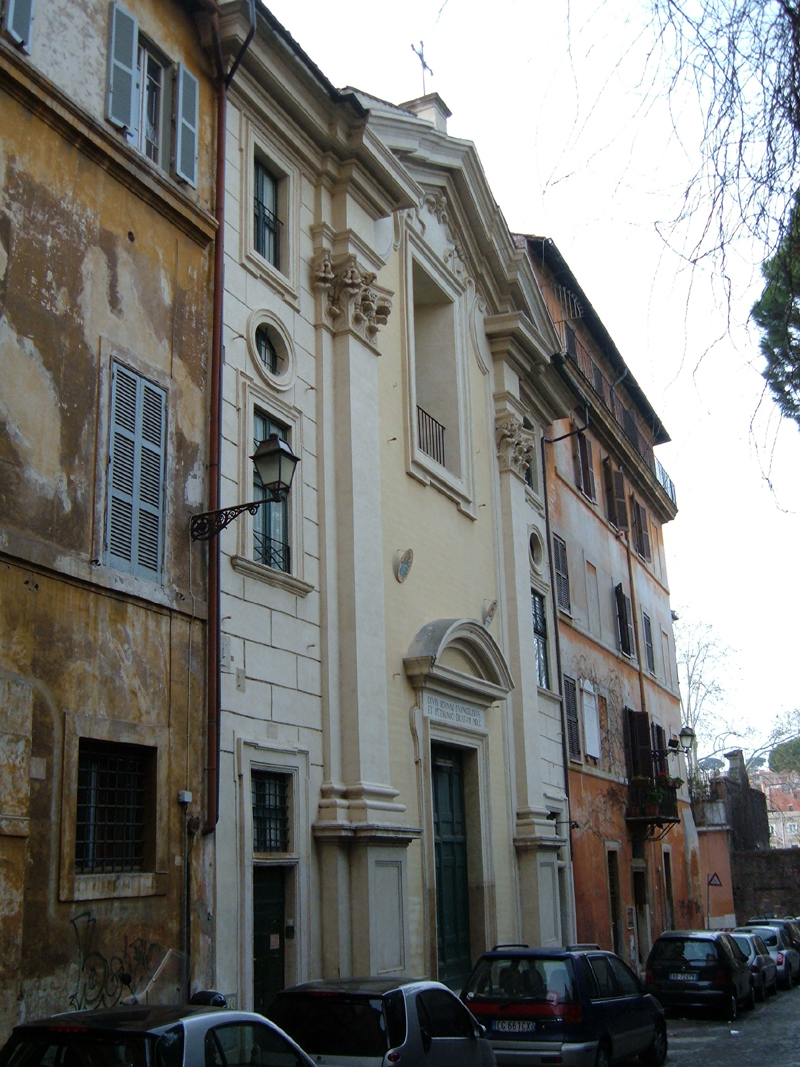
- Facade
- Click on the map for a fullscreen view
- 41°53′39″N 12°28′14″E
- Location: Via del Mascherone 61, Rome
- Country: Italy
- Language: Italian
- Denomination: Catholic
- Tradition: Roman Rite
- Website: sangiorgioinvelabro.com

History
- Status: titular church, regional church
- Dedication: John the Evangelist and Petronius of Bologna
- Dedicated: 1700

Architecture
- Architect: Ottaviano Nonni
- Style: Baroque
- Groundbreaking: 10th/11th century AD
- Completed: 1582

Administration
- Diocese: Rome

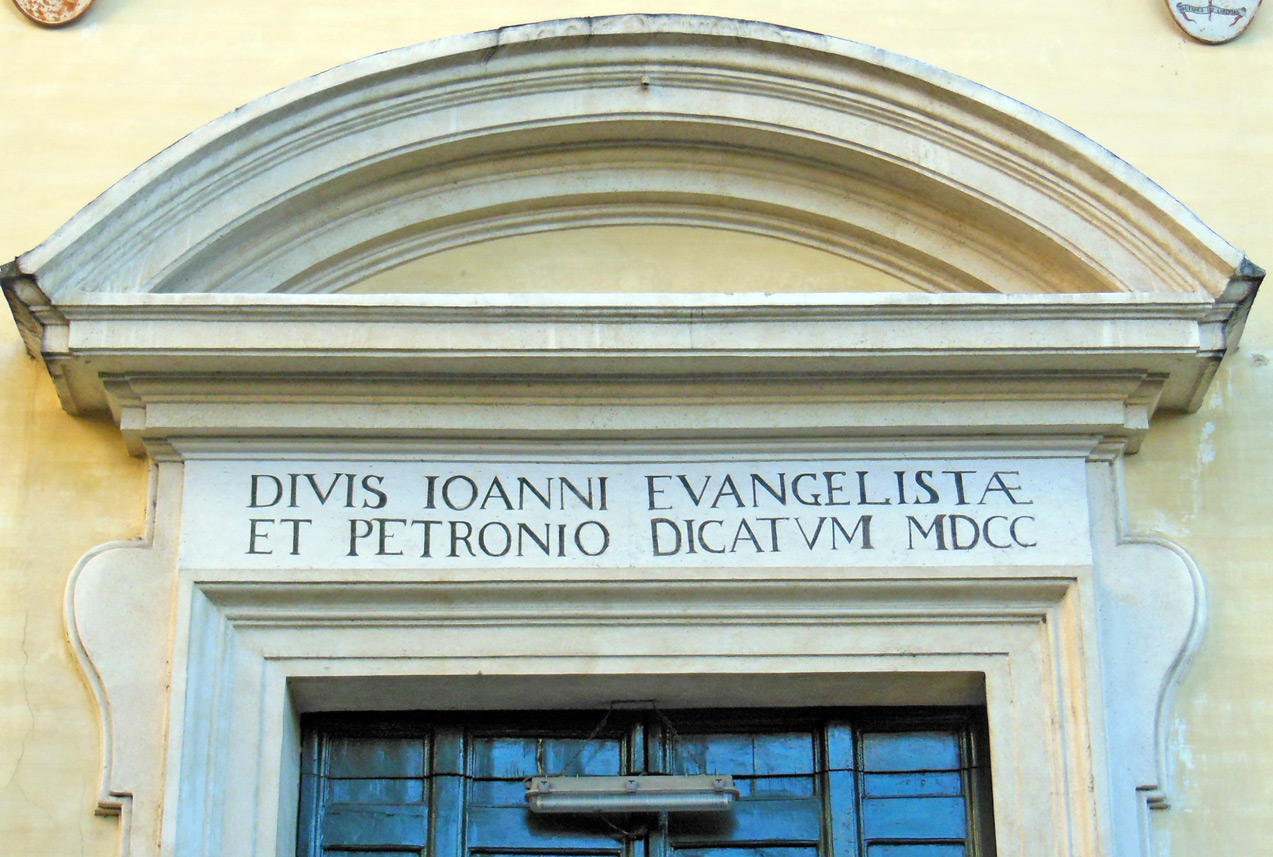
Latin inscription ("To the Divine John the Evangelist and Petronius dedicated 1700")

Santi Giovanni e Petronio dei Bolognesi is a Roman Catholic church in central Rome, Italy. It is named after the Saints John the Evangelist and Petronius, who are patrons of the city of Bologna. This church was made the "national church" of the Bolognese in Rome in 1581, by order of Pope Gregory XIII. It is located in the Rione of Regola, on Via del Mascherone, across the street and just south of the Gardens behind the Palazzo Farnese. It is today the "regional church" of Emilia-Romagna.

Mention of a parish church on the site was mentioned by 1186, and it was attached to the church of San Lorenzo in Damaso. At the Time it had a name of Sanctae Thomae de Yspanis (of Spain), and later San Tommaso dei Muratori, or della Catena, or dei Frati. The church was in disrepair, when Pope Gregory XIII Boncompagni, commissioned the Bolognese architect Ottaviano Mascherino to rebuild it as the national church of his countrymen. An adjacent oratory was built in 1601, but later razed. The facade was rebuilt in the late 17th century. The church property was once expropriated but returned to the church in 1940.

Most of the artists originally decorating the church were Bolognese, but many of the paintings were removed and some are lost. The painting to the right of the altar about the Transit of St Joseph was painted by Francesco Gessi, while the painting of Santa Caterina da Bologna (now lost) was painted by Giovanni Giuseppe dal Sole. The main altarpiece with a Virgin, Baby Jesus, and Saints John the Evangelist and Petronio was painted by Domenichino; it is now in the Galleria Nazionale d'Arte Antica in Palazzo Barberini of Rome. The missing altarpieces are replaced by works from unattributed artists. The tomb of Alessandro Algardi was destroyed. The virtues frescoed on the pennants were by Pompeo Aldrovandini.

It is a titular church. Its Cardinal-Priests have been:

- Giacomo Biffi (1985–2015)
- Baltazar Enrique Porras Cardozo (2016–present)

== Sources ==
- Nyborg
- Titi, Filippo (1763). Descrizione delle Pitture, Sculture e Architetture esposte in Roma. Marco Pagliarini, Rome. pp. 105–106.
