= Salvador Montes de Oca =

Venezuelan Roman Catholic prelate

Servant of God Salvador Montes de Oca O.Cart.
- Bishop Emeritus of Valencia
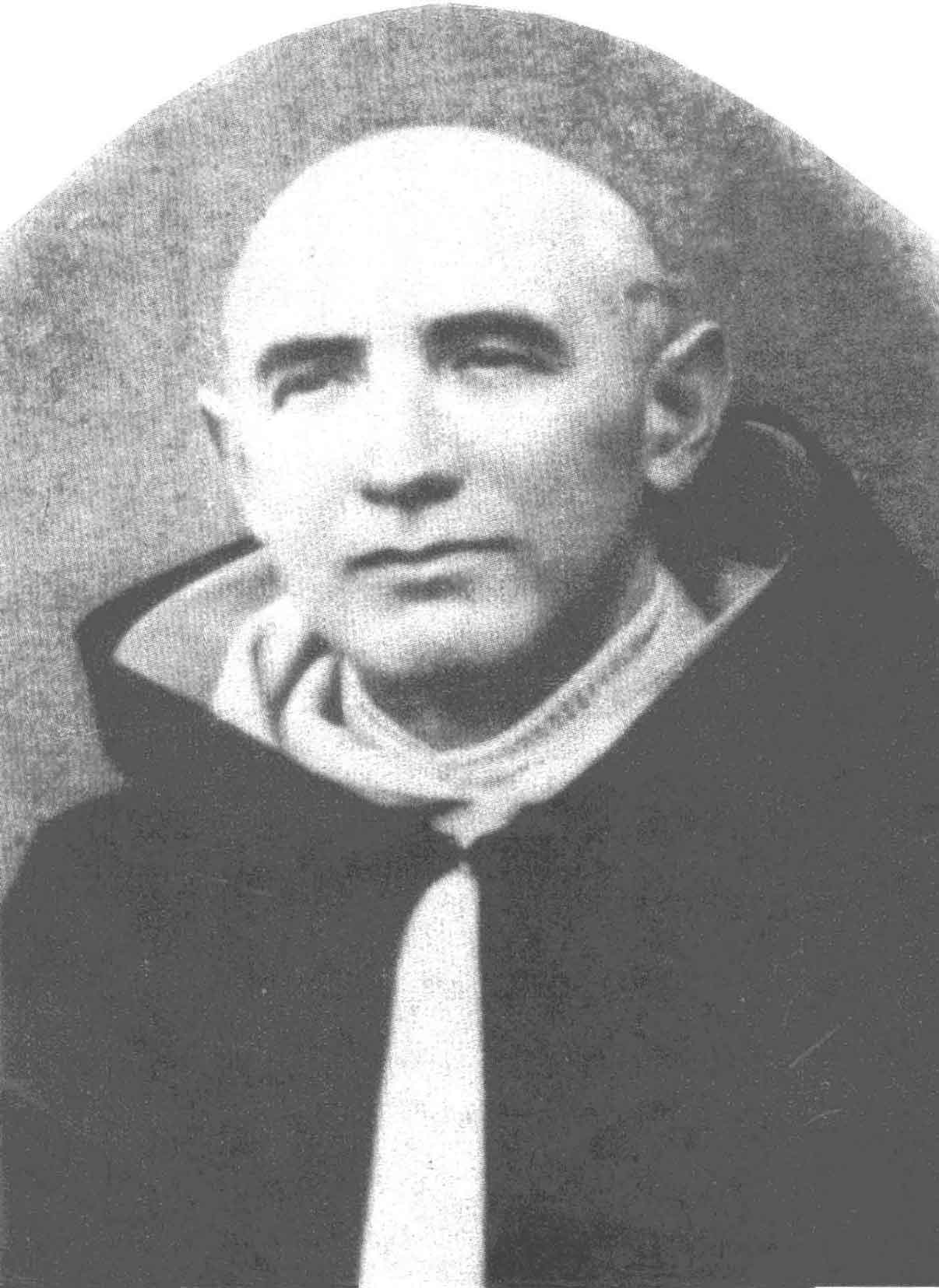
- Church: Roman Catholic Church
- Diocese: Valencia
- See: Valencia
- Appointed: 20 June 1927
- Installed: 27 October 1927
- Term ended: 22 December 1934
- Predecessor: Francisco Antonio Granadillo
- Successor: Gregorio Adam Dalmau
- Previous post: Titular Bishop of Bilta (1934–40)

Orders
- Ordination: 14 May 1922 by Aguedo Felipe Alvarado Liscano
- Consecration: 23 October 1927 by Fernando Cento

Personal details
- Born: Salvador Montes de Oca; 21 October 1895 Carora, Lara, Venezuela
- Died: 6 September 1944 (aged 48) Nocchi, Camaiore, Lucca, Kingdom of Italy
- Motto: Oported Illum Regnare

Sainthood
- Venerated in: Roman Catholic Church
- Title as Saint: Servant of God
- Attributes: Episcopal attire; Carthusian habit

Salvador Montes de Oca (21 October 1895 – 6 September 1944) – in religious Bernard(o) – was a Venezuelan Roman Catholic prelate and novice from the Carthusians who served as the Bishop of Valencia from 1927 until his resignation in 1934. Montes had limited pastoral experience before being appointed as a bishop but had served for a period as a spiritual director and after his appointment was known for upholding traditional teachings. But his defense of tradition on marriage and divorce led to his expulsion from Venezuela on the charge of inciting "rebellion" to which he was forced to reside at Port of Spain in Trinidad and Tobago from late 1929 until late 1931.

He later resigned from his see following an attack of peritonitis and moved to Lucca to enter the Carthusians as a novice. He and other monks were killed after a Nazi raid who alleged the monks were harboring their enemies.

The beatification process for Montes opened on 11 March 2017 in the latter's old diocese and he is now titled as a Servant of God.

== Life ==
Salvador Montes de Oca was born in Carora in Venezuela on 21 October 1895 as one of five sons to Andrés Montes de Oca Zubillaga and Rosario Montes de Oca Perera. He was baptized as Andrés Salvador María del Carmen Montes de Oca on 12 December 1895 in the church of San Juan Bautista in Carora with his uncle Julio Montes de Oca presiding.

He received his Confirmation from the diocesan bishop Liscano on 25 May 1901 and his First Communion later on 7 May 1905 from the priest Carlos Zubillaga.

He began his schooling in his hometown under the watch of his kinsman Lucio Montes de Oca. Montes studied for the ecclesial life in Barquisimeto. On 5 July 1914 he accompanied Bishop Aguedo Felipe Alvarado Liscano to Rome so Montes could continue his studies at the Pontifical Latin American Pontifical College at the time the bishop attended an "ad limina apostolorum" visit to the ailing Pope Pius X. Montes was made a subdeacon on 24 September 1921 and was elevated into the diaconate on 22 January 1922 (coinciding with the death of Pope Benedict XV). He was ordained to the priesthood on 14 May 1922 and said his first Mass in his hometown on 28 May before being appointed as Bishop Liscano's private aide. Montes later was appointed as the spiritual director for seminarians and then served as a chaplain at the Santuario della Paz.

He later became named as the Bishop of Valencia and he received his episcopal consecration on 23 October 1927 before he was enthroned in his new see the following 27 October.

The political strife he faced with the government of President Juan Bautista Pérez led to his exile on 11 October 1929. The reason for his exile was a document he released on 4 October 1929 and which was later published in the newspaper "La Religione" on the traditional teaching on marriage and divorce which he railed against. Montes set sail via boat to his exile at Port of Spain in Trinidad and Tobago where its archbishop John Pius Dowling welcomed him. But public backlash against his exile placed great pressure on the government who terminated his exile and sent word to him that he would be able to return to his diocese in 1931. Montes arrived in his homeland at the port of La Guairá on 10 October 1931 to resume his pastoral duties and on 18 March 1934 left for Rome to attend an "ad limina apostolorum" with Pope Pius XI. On 3 October 1934 he suffered a violent attack of peritonitis brought on from acute appendicitis which prompted an operation on 6 October. These health complications motivated his desire to resign from his see. Upon the resignation of his episcopal see he was granted the ceremonial role of a titular bishop but later resigned from that position upon his desire to enter the religious life. It was in the Tuscan region in the Italian kingdom that he lived with the Padri Sacramentini and even joined their ranks before deciding instead to enter the Carthusians at their convent in Lucca in 1943 and became a novice.

His first novitiate with the Padri Sacramentini from 15 August 1935 led to his initial profession on 8 December 1936 and his perpetual profession on 8 December 1939. But the Carthusian charism caught his attention and he decided to leave his order to join them instead and entered on 5 September 1942 during World War II.

On 10 September 1944 he and other monks were gunned down after Nazi authorities raided their convent and had slain them on the accusation of having granted safe haven to Italian political opponents. His remains were thrown into a mass grave alongside the other monks slain with him. In 1947 a paramedic team under the direction of Doctor Mariotti located his remains which were later transferred to Montes's old diocese back in his native land after their arrival on 11 June 1947 in the La Guairá port. His remains are now interred in his old cathedral beneath the main altar. On 5 September 2001 the Italian President Carlo Azeglio Ciampi granted Montes and ten other monks slain in the 1944 attack the Gold Medal for Civil Merit.

== Beatification process ==
The beatification process for the late bishop had been of interest in his homeland since the 2000s and the formal application for the cause's introduction was lodged to the Congregation for the Causes of Saints in 2015 who granted the request and allowed for the cause to open in his old diocese rather than in Lucca where he had been killed. The diocesan process was launched on 11 March 2017 and is ongoing; Montes has been titled as a Servant of God.

The current postulator for this cause is Dr. Silvia Mónica Correale.
