= Ignacio Velasco =

His Eminence Antonio Ignacio Velasco García
- Cardinal, Archbishop of Caracas
- Church: Catholic Church
- Archdiocese: Caracas
- Appointed: 27 May 1995
- Installed: 14 July 1995
- Term ended: 6 July 2003
- Predecessor: José Alí Lebrún Moratinos
- Successor: Jorge Liberato Urosa Savino
- Other post: Cardinal-Priest of Santa Maria Domenica Mazzarello (2001–03)
- Previous posts: Titular Bishop of Utimmira (1989–95); Apostolic Vicar of Puerto Ayacucho (1989–95); Apostolic Administrator of San Fernando de Apure (1992–94)

Orders
- Ordination: 17 December 1955 by Antonio Samorè
- Consecration: 6 January 1990 by John Paul II
- Created cardinal: 21 February 2001 by John Paul II
- Rank: Cardinal-Priest

Personal details
- Born: Antonio Ignacio Velasco García; 17 January 1929 Acarigua, Venezuela
- Died: 6 July 2003 (aged 74) Caracas, Venezuela
- Education: Pontifical Gregorian University
- Motto: Servus Christi pro fratribus

Styles of Ignacio Antonio Velasco García
- Reference style: His Eminence
- Spoken style: Your Eminence
- Informal style: Cardinal
- See: Caracas

Antonio Ignacio Velasco García, S.D.B. (17 January 1929 – 6 July 2003) was a Venezuelan prelate of the Catholic Church who served as the Archbishop of Caracas from 27 May 1995 until his death.

== Biography ==
Velasco was born on 17 January 1929 in Acarigua, Venezuela. He was ordained a priest on 17 December 1955.

On 23 October 1989, Pope John Paul II named him Apostolic Vicar of Puerto Ayacucho and titular bishop of Utimmira. He received his episcopal consecration on 27 January 1990. John Paul named him Archbishop of Caracas on 27 May 1994 and Velasco was installed there on 14 July.

He made Velasco a cardinal on 21 February 2001 and assigned him as Cardinal-Priest to the titular church of Santa Maria Domenica Mazzarello.

Velasco was known for his criticisms of Venezuelan President Hugo Chávez. In 2001 he appealed to the government to take attacks on Catholic churches more seriously. After Chávez repeatedly attacked the Church, Velasco said: "Every day I turn another cheek. I have no cheeks left because every day there is a new insult."

During the 2002 Venezuelan coup d'état attempt, Velasco attended the swearing in of Chávez' replacement, signed the Carmona Decree that disestablished the Chávez regime, and visited Chávez in exile in Orchila. Velasco later disassociated himself from the coup and his role remains unclear, combining an attempt to get Chávez to resign, an effort to protect Chávez' life, and doubts about the leadership of the short-lived coup. His personal antagonistic relationship with Chávez divided the conservative Church hierarchy from clergy who supported the radical social programs of the Chávez government.

Velasco died on 6 July 2003 after a long illness and treatment in Spain for cancer.

After Velasco's death, Chávez drew fire for his controversial statement that the Cardinal was "burning in hell".

Catholic Church titles
Preceded by José Lebrún Moratinos	Archbishop of Caracas; 27 May 1995 – 6 July 2003	Succeeded by Jorge Urosa
