= Francisco de Guruceaga Iturriza =

- Bishop of La Guaira
- Church: Catholic Church
- Diocese: Diocese of La Guaira
- In office: 2 October 1973 – 18 October 2001
- Predecessor: Marcial Augusto Ramírez Ponce
- Successor: José de la Trinidad Valera
- Previous posts: Bishop of Margarita (1969-1973); Titular Bishop of Villa Regis (1967-1969); Auxiliary Bishop of Ciudad Bolívar (1967-1969)

Orders
- Ordination: 14 August 1960
- Consecration: 21 May 1967 by José Humberto Quintero Parra

Personal details
- Born: 28 January 1928 Valencia, Carabobo, United States of Venezuela
- Died: 10 February 2012 (aged 84)

Francisco de Guruceaga Iturriza (28 January 1928 – 10 February 2012) was the Roman Catholic bishop of the Roman Catholic Diocese of La Guaira, Venezuela.

Ordained to the priesthood in 1960, de Guruceaga Iturriza became a bishop in 1967, resigning the see of La Guaira in 2001.
