= Reformed Catholic Church (Venezuela) =

- Classification: Independent Catholic
- Orientation: Anglican
- Polity: Episcopal
- Associations: Orthodox Anglican Communion
- Region: Venezuela
- Origin: 2008

The Reformed Catholic Church of Venezuela (Anglican Rite) (Spanish: Iglesia Católica Reformada de Venezuela) is a member jurisdiction of the Latin-American Anglican Church, a part of the global Orthodox Anglican Communion, and has received recognition from the Conservative Anglican Church of North America, a small United States-based group. It is therefore not a part of the Anglican Communion or the Roman Catholic Church.

== History ==
The jurisdiction was inaugurated in June 2008 by Roman Catholics, Anglicans, and Lutherans who rejected (among other things) the Roman Catholic ban on married priests. News reports claimed church leadership expressed support for some of the policies of President Hugo Chávez.

Several high-ranking prelates in the Roman Catholic Church have criticized the new jurisdiction for attempting to divide the larger Catholic Church, and asked Roman Catholics to avoid the church.
