= Bapara (Mauretania) =

Roman Empire - Mauretania Caesariensis (125 AD)

Bapara, Mauritania, was an Ancient city and former bishopric, now a Latin Catholic titular see.

== Bishopric ==
The Titular Episcopal See of Bapara is a titular see of the Roman Catholic Church. The current bishop is Valentin Cabbigat Dimoc, of the Philippines. The original seat of the diocese has been lost to history although it was in Mauretania Caesariensis and is generally assumed to have been near the promontory Ksila, on the Mediterranean coastline of Algeria.

=== Known bishops ===
- Bishop Jacob Barnabas Aerath 2007–2015
- Richard Joseph Garcia 1998–2006
- Rafael Ramón Conde Alfonzo 1995–1997
- Javier Miguel Ariz Huarte 1952–1995
- Vincemalus (fl484)
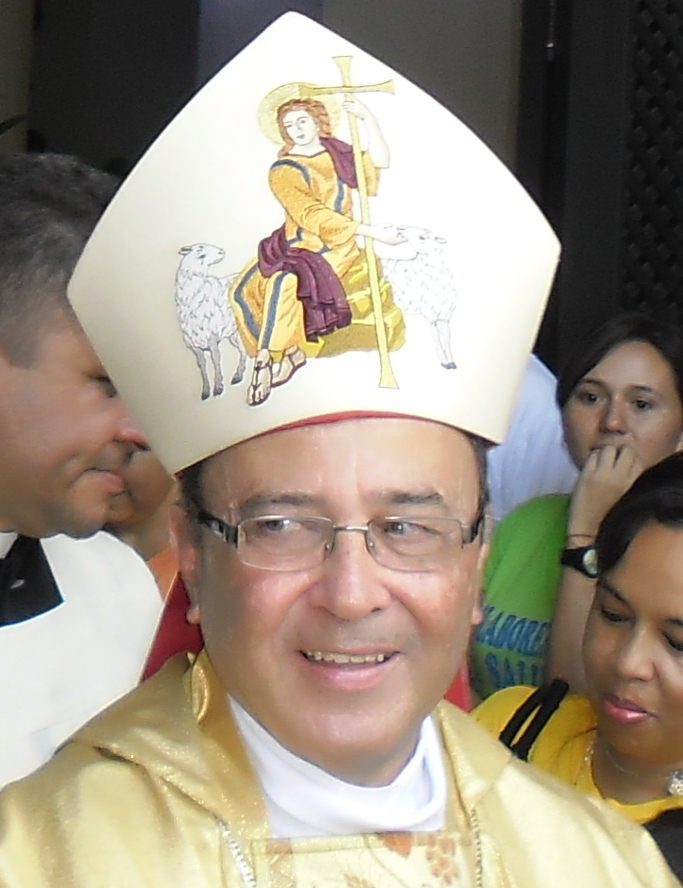
Mons. Rafael Conde Alfonzo.

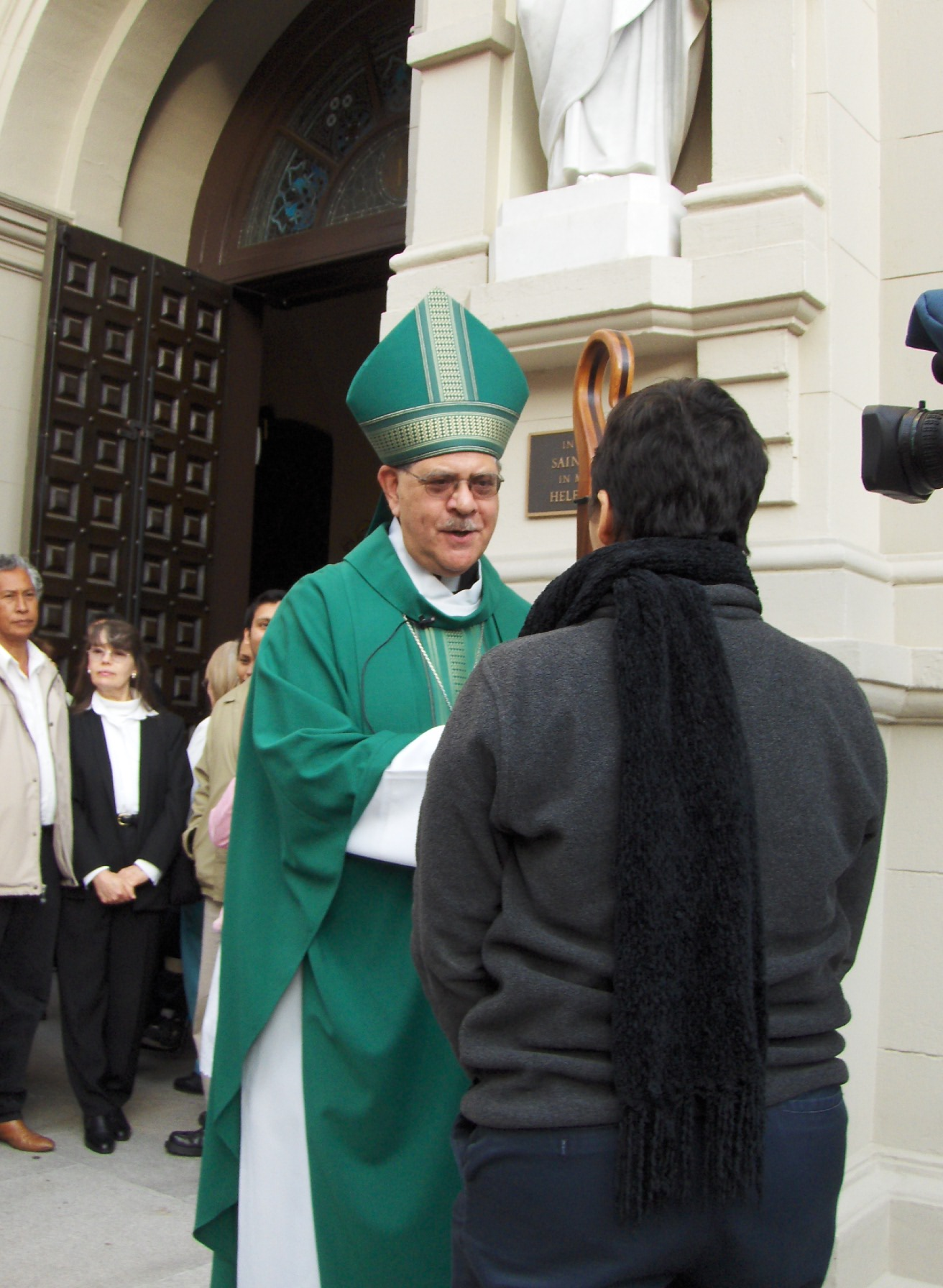
Bishop Richard Garcia.
