= St. Peter the Apostle Cathedral, La Guaira =

St. Peter the Apostle Cathedral
- Catedral de San Pedro Apóstol de La Guaira
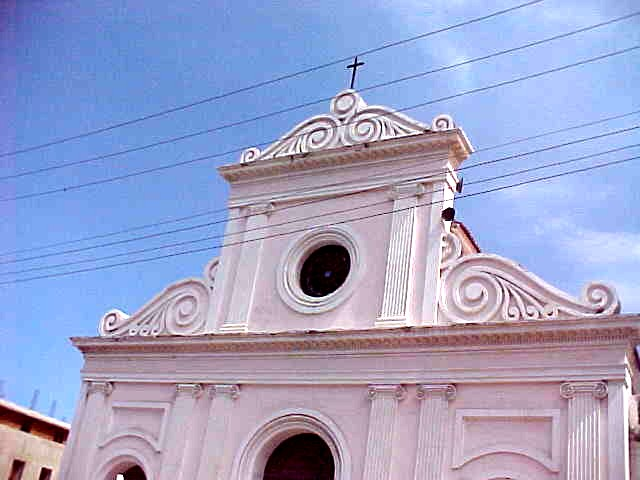
- St. Peter the Apostle Cathedral
- Location: La Guaira
- Country: Venezuela
- Denomination: Roman Catholic Church

Administration
- Diocese: Roman Catholic Diocese of La Guaira

The St. Peter the Apostle Cathedral (Spanish: Catedral de San Pedro Apóstol de La Guaira) also simply called Cathedral of St. Peter (Catedral de San Pedro) or alternatively Cathedral of La Guaira is a religious building belonging to the Catholic Church and is located in the city of La Guaira, Capital of the Vargas State in the South American country of Venezuela. It is a national historic monument declared as such in 1960 by the Official Gazette number 26,320. In 1969 the colonial surrounding area was also protected.

The cathedral follows the Roman or Latin rite and was dedicated as its name suggests the apostle St. Peter, which Catholics consider the first church leader. Since 1970 is the seat of the Diocese of La Guaira (Dioecesis Guairiensis) by decision of Pope Paul VI by the Bull Cum summus Deus.

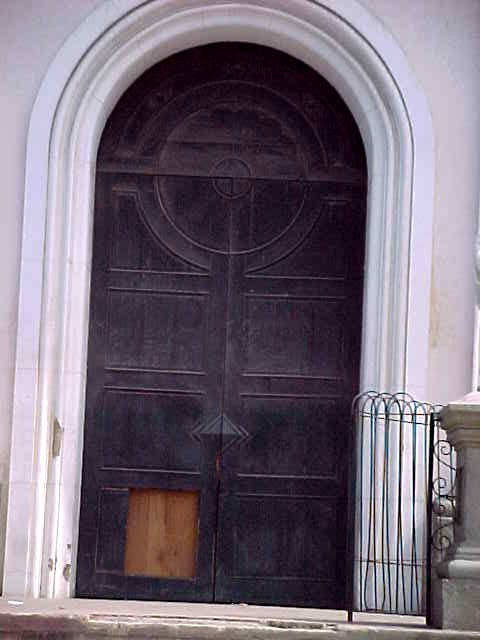
Door details

The first church in the Guaira was built in 1630, but was destroyed by pirates in 1743. A second cathedral built near the Vargas Square was left in ruins after the earthquake in 1812. The current building began to be built in 1847 and was finalized and blessed on October 8, 1857.

In 2014 the cathedral underwent a restoration process driven by regional authorities of Vargas.

== See also ==
- List of cathedrals in Venezuela
- Roman Catholicism in Venezuela
- St. Peter the Apostle
