= Archdiocese of Caracas =

Latin Catholic archdiocese in Venezuela

Coordinates: 10°30′22″N 66°54′51″W

Archdiocese of Caracas Archidiœcesis Caracarum Arquidiócesis de Caracas

Catholic
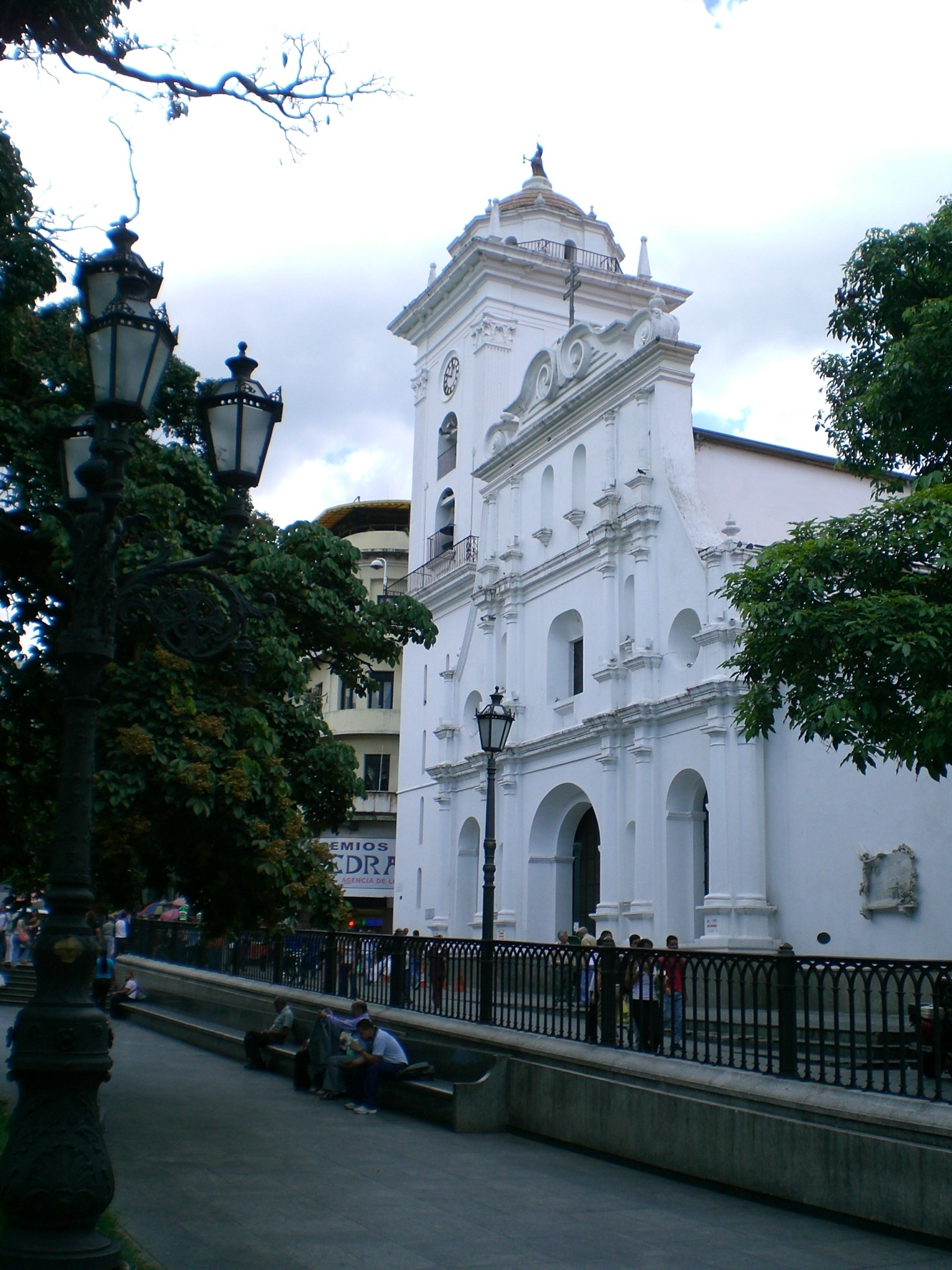
- Metropolitan Cathedral of St. Ann

Location
- Country: Venezuela
- Territory: Municipio Libertador, Municipio Chacao, Municipio Sucre, Municipio El Hatillo, Municipio Baruta.
- Ecclesiastical province: Province of Caracas

Statistics
- Area: 382 sq mi (990 km^{2})
- Population: Total; Catholics: (as of 2006); 4,644,000; 3,960,000 (85.3%)
- Parishes: 116

Information
- Denomination: Catholic Church
- Sui iuris church: Latin Church
- Rite: Roman Rite
- Established: 21 June 1531 (495 years ago)
- Cathedral: Catedral Metropolitana de Santa Ana

Current leadership
- Pope: Leo XIV
- Archbishop: Raúl Biord Castillo
- Auxiliary Bishops: Carlos Eduardo Márquez Delima
- Bishops emeritus: Baltazar Enrique Porras Cardozo

Map

Website
- website

The Archdiocese of Caracas is a Latin Church archdiocese of the Catholic Church in Venezuela. It was founded as the Diocese of Caracas on June 20, 1637, and was later elevated to the rank of a metropolitan see on November 27, 1803. It is a metropolitan see.

This episcopal see occupies a territory of about 790 square kilometers and is not unlikely to be given several auxiliary bishops. The archbishop is Raúl Biord Castillo, appointed by Pope Francis on June 28, 2024.

Its cathedral episcopal see is the Catedral Metropolitana de Santa Ana, in national capital Caracas, Distrito Federal, which also has three minor basilicas: Basílica de Santa Teresa, Basílica San Pedro Apóstol and Basílica Santuario de Santa Capilla (also a national shrine).

== History ==
- Established on 20 June 1637 as Diocese of Caracas alias Santiago de Venezuela, on vast territory split off from the suppressed Diocese of Coro, which had itself been established in 1531, by the Papal Bull Pro Excellentia praeeminentia issued by Pope Clement VII in St. Peter's in Rome on 21 June of that year and was based in Coro, Falcón State, then the capital of Venezuela, but vacant since 1721 to 1727.
- It lost territories in 1715 to establish the Apostolic Prefecture of Curaçao and on 16 February 1778 to establish the Diocese of Mérida (Venezuela).
- The Diocese was elevated to Metropolitan Archdiocese of Caracas by the papal bull In universalis ecclesiae regimine issued by Pope Pius VII on November 24, 1803. Until then it was a suffragan in the Ecclesiastical Province of the Archdiocese of Santo Domingo on Hispaniola, now in the Dominican Republic.
- It lost more territories repeatedly to establish Dioceses : on 1863.03.07 to establish the Calabozo, on 1922.10.12 Valencia (Venezuela), on 1958.06.21 Maracay, on 1965.07.23 Los Teques (its suffragan) and on 1970.04.15 La Guaira (also its suffragan).
- It enjoyed papal visits by Pope John Paul II in January 1985 and February 1996.

== Province ==
Its ecclesiastical province in Venezuela comprises the metropolitan's own archdiocese and the following suffragan sees:

- Roman Catholic Diocese of Guarenas
- Roman Catholic Diocese of La Guaira
- Roman Catholic Diocese of Los Teques
- Roman Catholic Diocese of Petare

== Bishops ==
=== Ordinaries ===
Bishops of Caracas

- Juan López de Agurto de la Mata (1637)
- Mauro Diego de Tovar y Valle Maldonado, O.S.B. (1639-1652), appointed Bishop of Chiapas
- Alonso de Briceño, O.F.M. (1653–1668)
- Antonio González de Acuña (1670–1682)
- Diego de Baños y Sotomayor (1683–1706)
- Francisco del Rincón, O.M. (1714–1716), Archbishop (personal title); appointed Archbishop of Santafé en Nueva Granada
- Juan José de Escalona y Calatayud (1717–1728), appointed Bishop of Michoacán
- José Félix Valverde (1728–1738), appointed Bishop of Michoacán
- Juan García Abadiano (1738–1747)
- Manuel Machado y Luna (1749–1752)
- Francisco de Antolino (1752–1755)
- Diego Díez Madroñero (1756–1769)
- Mariano Martí (1770–1792)
- Juan de la Virgen María y Viana (1792–1798)
- Francisco de Ibarra (1798–1803)

Archbishops of Caracas

- Francisco de Ibarra (1803–1806)
- Narciso Coll y Prat (1808–1822), appointed Bishop of Palencia
- Ramón Méndez (1827–1839)
- Ignacio Fernández Peña (1841–1849)
- Silvestre Guevara y Lira (1852–1876)
- José Antonio Ponte (1876–1883)
- Críspulo Uzcátegui (1884–1904)
- Juan Bautista-Castro (1904–1915)
- Felipe Rincón González (1916–1946)
- Lucas Guillermo Castillo Hernández (1946–1955)
- Rafael Arias Blanco (1955–1959)
- Cardinal José Humberto Quintero Parra (1960–1980)
- Cardinal José Lebrún Moratinos (1980–1995)
- Cardinal Ignacio Velasco, S.D.B. (1995–2003)
- Cardinal Jorge Urosa (2005–2018)
- Cardinal Baltazar Enrique Porras Cardozo (2023–2024)
- Raúl Biord Castillo (since 2024)

=== Coadjutor bishops ===
- Juan Bautista-Castro (1903–1904)
- Lucas Guillermo Castillo Hernández (1939–1946)
- Rafael Arias Blanco (1952–1955)
- José Lebrún Moratinos (1972–1980); future Cardinal

=== Auxiliary bishops ===
- Nicolás Eugenio Navarro (1943–1960)
- Ramón J. Lizardi (1956–1972)
- José Rincón Bonilla (1961–1984)
- Luis Eduardo Henríquez Jiménez (1962–1972), appointed Bishop of Valencia en Venezuela
- Jesús Maria Pellin (1965–1969)
- Ramón Ovidio Pérez Morales (1970–1980), appointed Bishop of Coro
- Marcial Augusto Ramírez Ponce (1972–1996), appointed Bishop of Venezuela, Military
- Ramón Hernández Peña (1974–1976), appointed Coadjutor Bishop of Trujillo
- Alfredo José Rodríguez Figueroa (1974–1987), appointed Bishop of Cumaná
- Miguel Delgado Avila, S.D.B. (1979–1991), appointed Bishop of Barcelona
- Jorge Liberato Urosa Savino (1982–1990), appointed Archbishop of Valencia en Venezuela (later returned here as Archbishop); future Cardinal
- José Vicente Henriquez Andueza, S.D.B. (1985–1987), appointed Bishop of Maracay
- Ubaldo Ramón Santana Sequera, F.M.I. (1990–1991), appointed Bishop of Ciudad Guayana
- Diego Rafael Padrón Sánchez (1990–1994), appointed Bishop of Maturín
- Mario del Valle Moronta Rodríguez (1990–1995), appointed Bishop of Los Teques
- Roberto Antonio Dávila Uzcátegui (1992–2005)
- Rafael Ramón Conde Alfonzo (1995–1997), appointed Coadjutor Bishop of La Guaira
- José de la Trinidad Valera Angulo (1997–2001), appointed Bishop of La Guaira
- Pedro Nicolás Bermúdez Villamizar, C.I.M. (1997–2009)
- Saúl Figueroa Albornoz (1997–2011), appointed Bishop of Puerto Cabello
- Luis Armando Tineo Rivera (2007–2013), appointed Bishop of Carora
- Jesús González de Zárate Salas (2007–2018), appointed Archbishop of Cumaná
- Fernando José Castro Aguayo (2009–2015), appointed Bishop of Margarita
- Tulio Luis Ramírez Padilla (2012–2020), appointed Bishop of Guarenas
- José Trinidad Fernández Angulo (2014–2021), appointed Bishop of Trujillo
- Enrique José Parravano Marino, S.D.B. (2016–2019), appointed Bishop of Maracay
- Ricardo Aldo Barreto Cairo (2019–2024)
- Carlos Márquez Delima (2021-)
- Lisandro Alirio Rivas Durán (2021-)

=== Other priests of this diocese who became bishops ===
- José Manuel Arroyo y Niño, appointed Bishop of Guayana in 1856
- Román Lovera, appointed Bishop of Mérida in 1880
- Manuel Arteaga y Betancourt, appointed Archbishop of San Cristobal de la Habana, Cuba in 1941 (Cardinal in 1946)

== See also ==
- Catholic Church in Venezuela

== Sources and external links ==
- Official website
- GCatholic.org, with incumbent biography links
- Catholic-Hierarchy ^{[self-published]}
- Catholic Encyclopedia
