= José Lebrún Moratinos =

His Eminence Servant of God José Lebrún Moratinos
- Archbishop Emeritus of Caracas
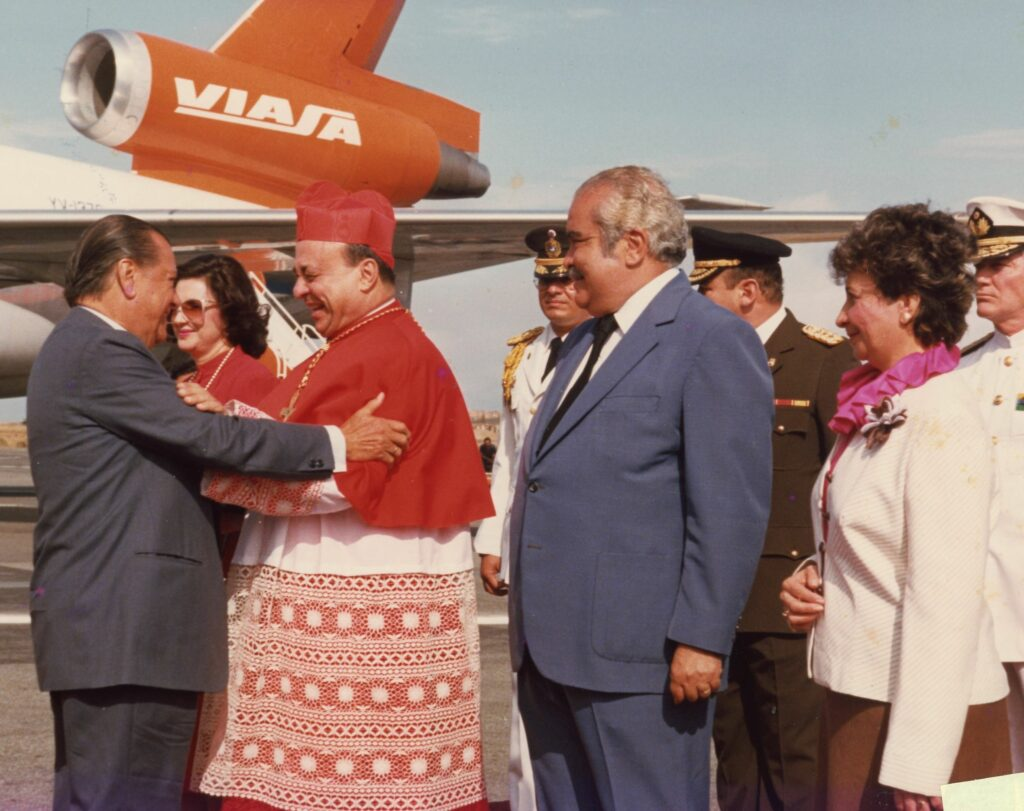
- Church: Roman Catholic Church
- Archdiocese: Caracas
- See: Caracas
- Appointed: 24 May 1980
- Term ended: 27 May 1995
- Predecessor: José Humberto Quintero Parra
- Successor: Ignacio Antonio Velasco García
- Other post: Cardinal-Priest of San Pancrazio (1983–2001)
- Previous posts: Titular Bishop of Aradus (1956–58); Auxiliary Bishop of Maracaibo (1956–58); Bishop of Maracay (1958–62); Bishop of Valencia (1962–72); Titular Archbishop of Voncaria (1972–80); Coadjutor Archbishop of Caracas (1972–80); President of the Venezuelan Episcopal Conference (1984–90)

Orders
- Ordination: 19 December 1943 by Gregorio Adam Dalmau
- Consecration: 2 September 1956 by Raffaele Forni
- Created cardinal: 2 February 1983 by Pope John Paul II
- Rank: Cardinal-Priest

Personal details
- Born: José Alí Lebrún Moratinos; 19 March 1919 Puerto Cabello, Venezuela
- Died: 21 February 2001 (aged 81) Caracas, Venezuela
- Buried: Caracas Cathedral
- Parents: Enrique Lebrún; Josefina Moratinos
- Education: Pontifical Gregorian University; Pontifical Latin American College
- Motto: Veritatem facientes in caritate
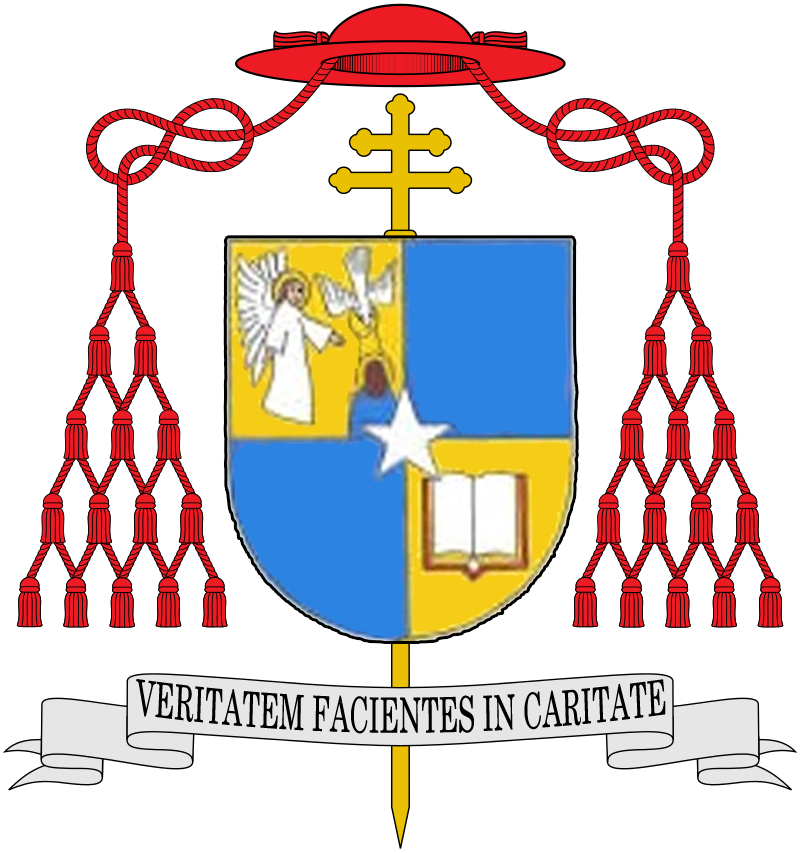
- Coat of arms

Styles of José Lebrún Moratinos
- Reference style: His Eminence
- Spoken style: Your Eminence
- Informal style: Cardinal
- See: Caracas

José Alí Lebrún Moratinos (19 March 1919 – 21 February 2001) was a Roman Catholic Cardinal and Archbishop of Caracas.

== Early life and priesthood ==
He was born in Puerto Cabello, Venezuela, as the eldest of the five children. He was confirmed in his native city by Felipe Rincón González, Archbishop of Caracas. He was educated at Colegio San José, of the Brothers of the Christian Schools. He entered the Interdiocesan Seminary of Caracas, where he was taught from 1934 until 1937. He travelled to Rome to study at the Pontifical Gregorian University. He earned a licentiate in philosophy in 1941. He then started studying theology but had to leave Italy because of the Second World War. He was ordained to the priesthood on 19 December 1943. He served from 1943 until 1956 in Valencia, as a faculty member, spiritual director and rector of its seminary as well as its chaplain. He did pastoral work in several parishes and was chaplain of the local jail.

== Episcopate ==
Pope Pius XII appointed him titular bishop of Arado and auxiliary bishop of the diocese of Maracaibo on 2 August 1956. He was consecrated exactly a month later by the Nuncio to Venezuela. He was appointed Apostolic administrator of the see of Maracaibo on 23 October 1957. He was transferred to the see of Maracay in 1958. He was transferred to the see of Valencia in Venezuela in 1962. As a bishop he attended the Second Vatican Council. Pope Paul VI appointed him as Titular Archbishop of Voncaria and Coadjutor bishop of Caracas on 16 September 1972. He was elected vice-president of the Venezuelan Episcopal conference. He succeeded to the metropolitan see of Caracas on 24 May 1980.

== Cardinalate ==
He was made Cardinal-Priest of S. Pancrazio in the consistory of 2 February 1983 by Pope John Paul II. He was elected President of the Episcopal Conference of Venezuela, serving from 1984 to 1990. He resigned as archbishop on 27 May 1995. He died on 21 February 2001 in Caracas. He is buried along with all the other bishops of Caracas.

== Canonization ==
In May 2021, the Roman Catholic Archdiocese of Caracas has initiated the initial steps for his canonization process.

== Personal life ==
Besides his native Spanish, he spoke Italian, Latin and French.

Preceded by José Quintero Parra	Archbishop of Caracas; 24 May 1980 – 27 May 1995	Succeeded by Ignacio Velasco
