= Reinaldo del Prette Lissot =

Venezuelan Roman Catholic prelate (1952–2022)

His Excellency Reinaldo del Prette Lissot
- Archbishop of Valencia en Venezuela
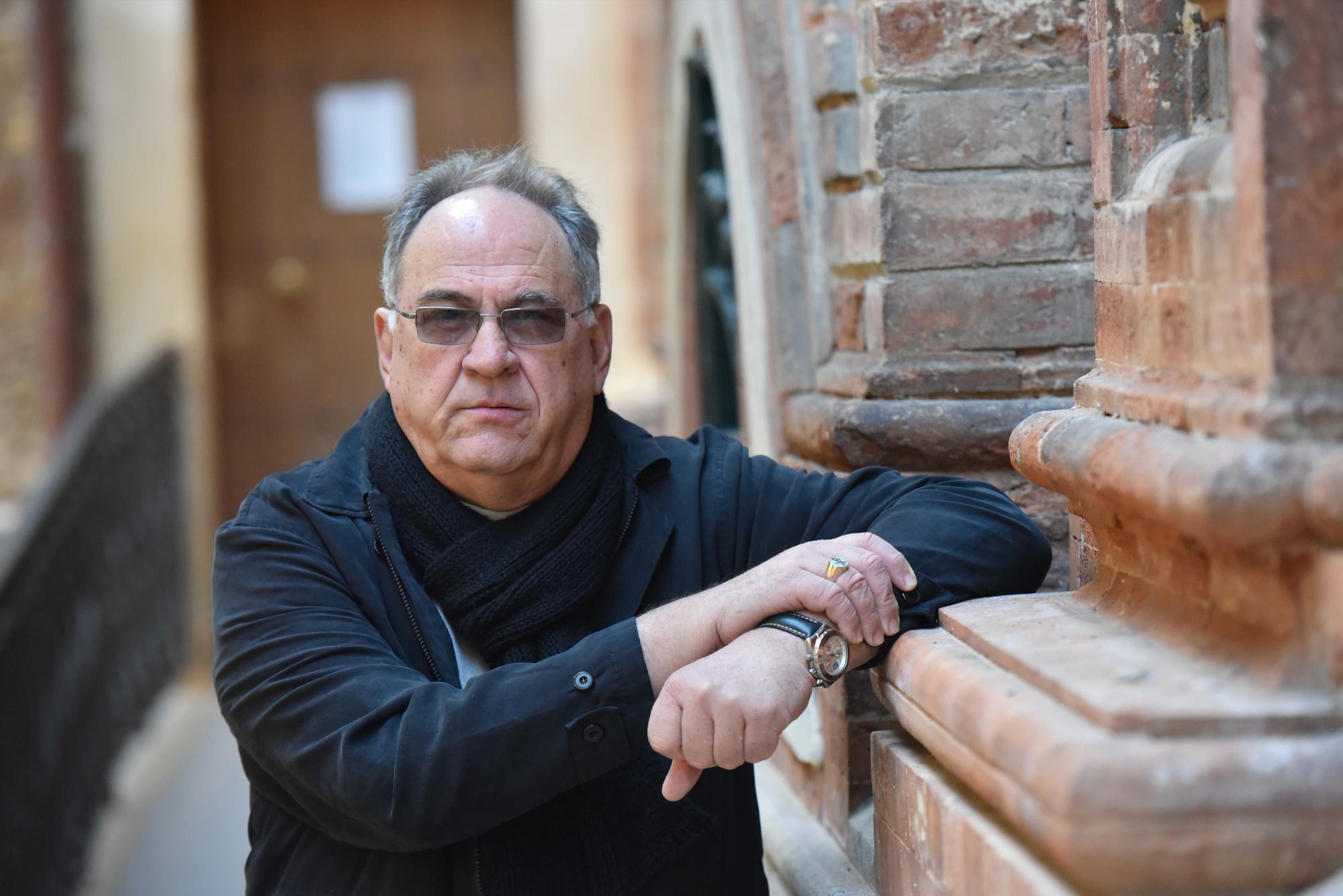
- Appointed: 10 April 2007
- Term ended: 21 November 2022
- Predecessor: Jorge Liberato Urosa Savino
- Successor: Vacant
- Previous posts: Auxiliary Bishop of Valencia en Venezuela and Titular Bishop of Altava (1993–1997); Coadjutor Bishop of Maracay (1997–2003); Bishop of Maracay (2003–2007)

Orders
- Ordination: 15 August 1976 by Luis Eduardo Henríquez Jiménez
- Consecration: 5 February 1994 by Jorge Liberato Urosa Savino

Personal details
- Born: 17 February 1952 Valencia, Venezuela
- Died: 21 November 2022 (aged 70) Valencia, Venezuela

Reinaldo del Prette Lissot (17 February 1952 – 21 November 2022) was a Venezuelan Roman Catholic prelate.

Del Prette Lissot was born in Venezuela and was ordained to the priesthood in 1976. Del Prette Lissot served as titular bishop of Altava and auxiliary bishop of the Roman Catholic Archdiocese of Valencia in Venezuela from 1994 to 1997 and then served as coadjutor bishop and diocesan bishop of the Roman Catholic Diocese of Maracay from 1997 to 2007. He then served as the archbishop of the Archdiocese of Valencia in Venezuela from 2007 until his death in 2022.

Catholic Church titles
Preceded by Jorge Liberato Urosa Savino	Archbishop of Valencia en Venezuela; 2007–2022	Succeeded by Vacant
Preceded by José Vicente Henriquez Andueza	Bishop of Maracay; 2003–2007	Succeeded by Rafael Ramón Conde Alfonzo
Preceded by —	Coadjutor Bishop of Maracay; 1997–2003	Succeeded by —
Preceded by Adam Dyczkowski	Titular Bishop of Altava; 1993–1997	Succeeded by Émile Jean Marie Henri Joseph Destombes
Preceded by —	Auxiliary Bishop of Valencia en Venezuela; 1993–1997	Succeeded by —
