= Archdiocese of Valencia in Venezuela =

Latin Catholic archdiocese in Venezuela

Coordinates: 10°10′57″N 68°00′09″W

Archdiocese of Valencia en Venezuela Archidioecesis Valentinus in Venetiola

Catholic
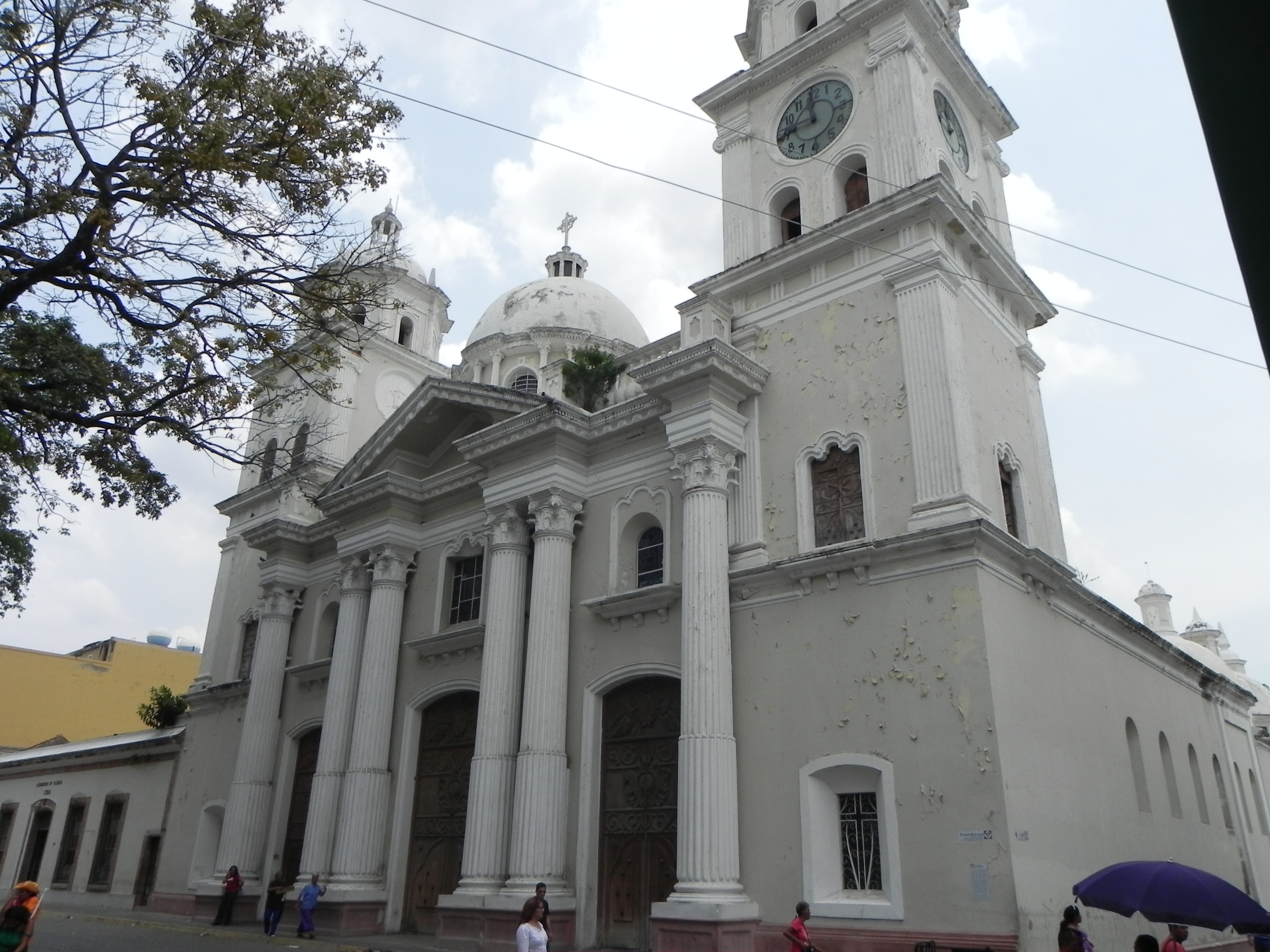
- Cathedral Basilica of Our Lady of Help

Location
- Country: Venezuela

Statistics
- Area: 3,921 km^{2} (1,514 sq mi)
- Population: Total; Catholics: (as of 2004); 1,850,000; 1,650,000 (89.2%)

Information
- Denomination: Catholic Church
- Sui iuris church: Latin Church
- Rite: Roman Rite
- Established: 12 October 1922 (104 years ago)
- Cathedral: Catedral Basílica de Nuestra Señora del Socorro

Current leadership
- Pope: Leo XIV
- Archbishop: Jesús González de Zárate Salas

Map

The Archdiocese of Valencia en Venezuela (Latin: Archidioecesis Valentinus in Venetiola) is a Latin Church archdiocese of the Catholic Church located in the city of Valencia in Venezuela.

== History ==
On 12 October 1922 Pope Pius XI established the Diocese of Valencia from the Metropolitan Archdiocese of Caracas. Pope Paul VI elevated the diocese to an archdiocese on 12 November 1974.

== Bishops ==
=== Ordinaries ===
- Francisco Antonio Granadillo † (22 Jun 1923 – 13 Jan 1927)
- Salvador Montes de Oca † (20 Jun 1927 – 22 Dec 1934)
- Gregorio Adam Dalmau † (29 Aug 1937 – 12 Jul 1961)
- José Alí Lebrún Moratinos † (19 Mar 1962 – 21 Sep 1972) Appointed, Coadjutor Archbishop of Caracas; future Cardinal
- Luis Eduardo Henríquez Jiménez † (9 Nov 1972 – 16 Mar 1990)
- Jorge Liberato Urosa Savino † (16 Mar 1990 – 19 Sep 2005) Appointed, Archbishop of Caracas (Cardinal in 2006)
- Reinaldo del Prette Lissot † (10 Apr 2007 – 21 November 2022)
- Jesús González de Zárate Salas (since 28 June 2024)

=== Auxiliary bishops ===
- José Joaquín Troconis Montiel (1977-1986)
- Nelson Antonio Martínez Rust (1982-1992), appointed Bishop of San Felipe
- Reinaldo del Prette Lissot † (1993-1997), appointed Coadjutor Bishop of Maracay (later returned here as Archbishop)
- José Sótero Valero Ruz † (1998-2001), appointed Bishop of Guanare

=== Other priests of this diocese who became bishops ===
- Alfredo José Rodríguez Figueroa †, appointed Auxiliary Bishop of Caracas, Santiago de Venezuela in 1974
- Diego Rafael Padrón Sánchez, appointed Auxiliary Bishop of Caracas, Santiago de Venezuela in 1990
- Ramón Antonio Linares Sandoval, appointed Bishop of Puerto Cabello on 1994
- Tulio Luis Ramírez Padilla, appointed Auxiliary Bishop of Caracas, Santiago de Venezuela in 2012

== Suffragan dioceses ==
- Maracay
- Puerto Cabello
- San Carlos de Venezuela

== See also ==
- Roman Catholicism in Venezuela

== Sources ==
- GCatholic.org
- Catholic Hierarchy ^{[self-published]}
- Diocese website
