= Episcopal Conference of Venezuela =

Assembly of Catholic bishops

Venezuelan Episcopal Conference
- Conferencia Episcopal Venezolana
- Formation: July 14, 1973; 53 years ago
- Type: Archdiocesan organization
- Headquarters: Montalbán, Caracas, Venezuela
- Location: Venezuela
- President: Archbishop Diego Padrón
- Website: conferenciaepiscopalvenezolana.com

The Venezuelan Episcopal Conference (CEV) (Spanish: Conferencia Episcopal Venezolana) is a permanent institution. Its stated aim is, according to Second Vatican Council, associated with the Bishops of the Republic to exercise together, as an expression of collegial spirit, certain pastoral functions on the faithful of their territory and to promote according to the rule of law, the greater good which the Catholic Church offers humankind, especially through forms and programs of the apostolate fittingly adapted to the circumstances of time and place.

== Base teacher ==
The documents outline the very life and work of the 113 Episcopal Conferences, currently in the world, are: "Lumen gentium" (23), "Christus Dominus" (37–38), "Ecclesiae Imago" (211), "Sanctae Ecclesiae" (41), "Apostolos Suos" and the 1983 Code of Canon Law (cn. 447–459).

The decree Christus Dominus of Vatican II, on the Pastoral Office of Bishops in the Church (approved on October 28, 1965), devotes Chapter III Cooperation of Bishops to the common good of the other Churches. In particular, the numbers 37 and 38 refer to the Episcopal Conferences. Previously, the decree specifies: "From the first centuries of the Church, the bishops who were in charge of particular churches, moved by the communion of fraternal charity and zeal for the universal mission entrusted to the Apostles, joined forces and wills to promote the good of the particular Churches. " (Cf. 36). Further emphasizes that, in modern times, the bishops find it very difficult to fulfill in a timely and fruitful mission "but work closely together with other bishops." The Council reminds the institution, in some nations, of the Episcopal Conferences, which have allowed a more coordinated and apostolate, therefore, more fruitful, so that "this sacred Council thinks should be large so that in all the earth, the Bishops of the same nation or region are grouped into single board (assembly), meeting at stated times, in order to communicate the lights of prudence and experience, to deliberate together to form a holy force cooperation for the common good of the churches "(cf. 37). Immediately enacts, among other things, concerning: - the objectives of the Episcopal Conference (cf. 38, 1), - to whom belong to them (cf. 38, 2) - to the rules: Each Conference shall prepare their own, to be approved by the Apostolic See, and shall be laid in the various agencies that compose it (cf. 38, 3), - the decisions made, so when they are approved and shall be binding (cf. 38, 4); In accordance with the provisions of Council's decree, it should proceed in each country, to organize the respective Episcopal Conferences.

In July 1973 (see Church of Venezuela, Year I, No. 1), see the Bulletin of the Permanent Secretariat of the Bishops of Venezuela. In this Bulletin is collected, from birth, all concerning the Venezuelan Episcopal Conference. Indeed, in No. 2 (November 1973, p. 15-20), broadly outlined the Plenary Meeting of the Venezuelan Episcopal Conference, held from 9 to July 14, 1973-sort of constituent -. On pages 15 to 20 of this issue, disclosed the STATUTES OF THE VENEZUELAN BISHOPS, preceded by a brief note that says: The Venezuelan Episcopal Conference, on the 12th. Meeting of its last Plenary Assembly (14/07/73) approved the new statutes of the same ... And he adds: Here are the new Constitution, preceded by the Decree of the Sacred Congregation for Bishops for which are ratified. On the next page published (in Latin) to the Decree of the Sacred Congregation for Bishops, issued in Rome on September 29, 1973, are the statutes, which include the following chapters: 1. PURPOSE AND ORGANS OF THE CONFERENCE. 2. PLENARY ASSEMBLY. 3. PERMANENT CENTRAL COMMITTEE 4. SPECIAL COMMISSIONS 5. SECRETARIAD PERMANENT. 6. MISCELLANEOUS. FIRST ASSEMBLY PLENARY MEETING OF THE VENEZUELAN BISHOPS, under the new Constitution, was held from 7 to 12 January 1974, starting the enumeration of the Episcopal Assemblies currently in effect. The Venezuelan Episcopal Conference consisted of:

== Archbishops ==
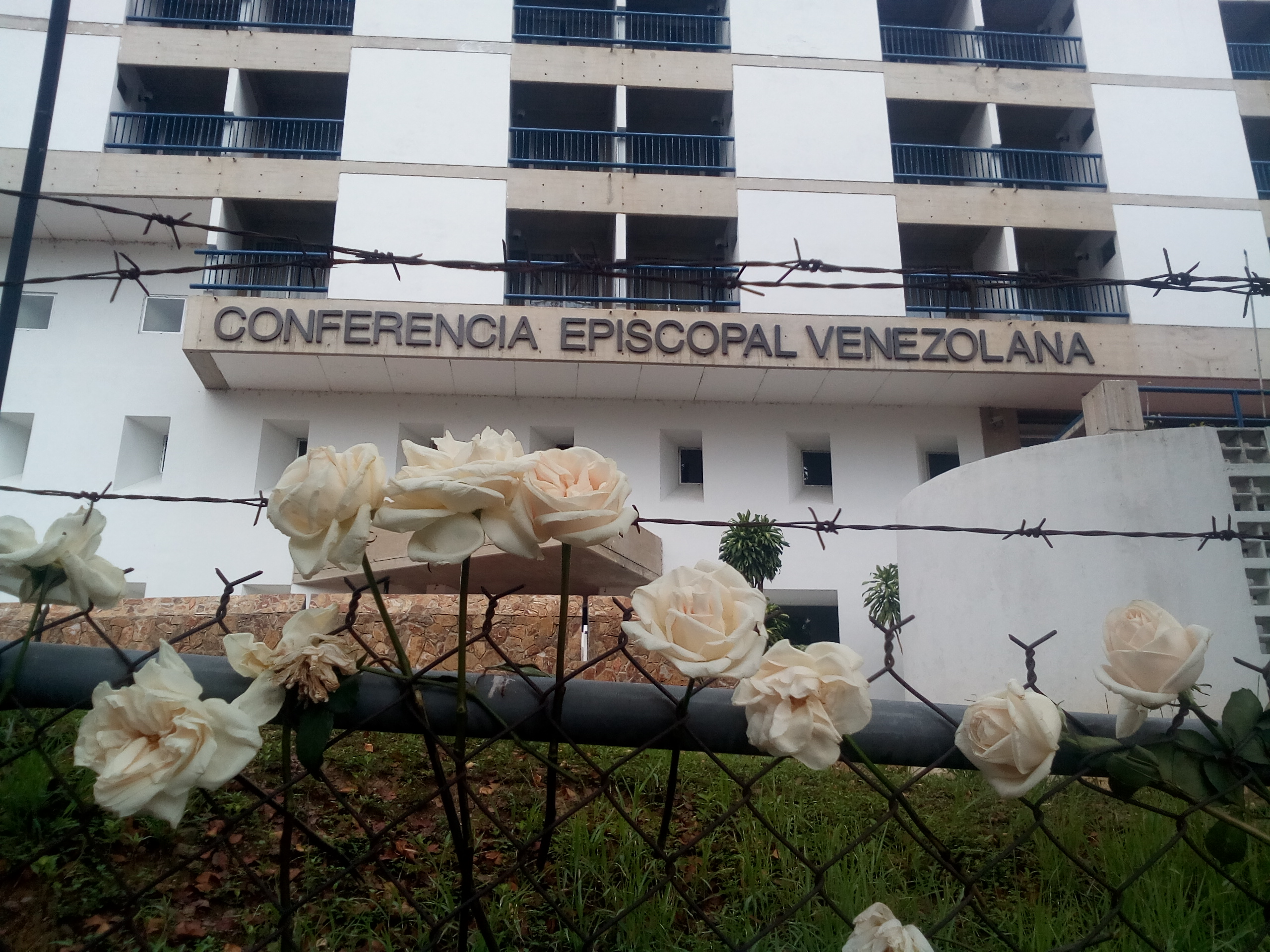
White roses outside the Conference after the March of Silence in 2017

- Archbishop Raúl Biord Castillo, S.D.B., Archbishop of Caracas
- Archbishop Benítez Fontúrvel Clench, Archbishop of Barquisimeto, President of the CEV.
- Monsignor Crisanto Darío Mata Cova, Archbishop of Ciudad Bolivar.
- Archbishop Juan José Bernal Archbishop of Los Teques
- Archbishop Domingo Roa Pérez, Archbishop of Maracaibo
- Archbishop Ángel Pérez Cisneros, Archbishop of Mérida

== Bishops ==
- Bishop Francis Joseph Iturriza, Bishop of Coro
- Archbishop José Rincón Bonilla, Auxiliary Bishop of Caracas
- Bishop Alejandro Fernandez Feo, Bishop of San Cristobal
- Second Bishop García, Vicar Apostolic of Puerto Ayacucho
- Bishop Miguel Aurrecoechea, Vicar Apostolic of Machiques
- Argimiro Bishop García, Vicar Apostolic of Tucupita
- Archbishop Antonio José Ramírez, Bishop of Maturin
- Bishop Miguel Antonio Salas, Bishop of Calabozo
- Bishop Jose Rojas Leo, Bishop of Trujillo
- Bishop Luis Eduardo Henriquez, Bishop of Valencia
- Bishop Feliciano Gonzalez, Bishop of Maracay
- Bishop Thomas Marquez Gomez, Bishop of San Felipe
- Bishop Eduardo Herrera Riera, Auxiliary Bishop of Barquisimeto
- Bishop Rafael A. R. Gonzalez, Bishop of Barinas
- Maradei Bishop Constantine, Bishop of Barcelona
- Bishop Mariano Parra Leon, Bishop of Cumana
- Monsignor Angel Rodriguez Polachini, Bishop of Guanare
- Bishop Marcial Ramirez Ponce, Auxiliary Bishop of Caracas
- Bishop Francisco de Guruceaga, Bishop of La Guaira and Apostolic Administrator of Margarita
- Monsignor Mariano Gutierrez, Vicar Apostolic of Santa Elena de Wairén
- Monsignor Marco Tulio Ramírez Roa, Bishop of Cabimas
- Bishop Ramón Ovidio Pérez Morales, Auxiliary Bishop of Caracas, Secretary General
- Archbishop Romero Luzardo Medard, Bishop of San Carlos
- Bishop Roberto Davila Uzcátegui, Prelate of San Fernando de Apure
- Bishop Rosalio Castillo Lara, Bishop Coadjutor with right of succession of Trujillo

== Directive ==
Presidency of the CEV. January 2009 - January 2012. Standing Committee

- President Hon. Archbishop Ubaldo Ramón Santana Sequera, Archbishop of Maracaibo
- 1st. Vice President Hon. Archbishop Baltazar Porras Cardozo, Archbishop of Mérida
- 2nd. Vice President Hon. Bishop Roberto Lückert León, Archbishop of Coro
- Secretary General. Bishop Jesús González de Zárate, Auxiliary Bishop of Caracas

== Members of the CEV ==
Members of the Venezuelan Episcopal Conference (CEV) are:

- All residential Archbishops and Bishops, Administrators and Vicars Apostolic Diocesan Administrators and others who by right are equal to Diocesan Bishops.
- The Archbishops and Bishops Coadjutor and Auxiliary.
- Headline Bishops who exercise a pastoral office to serve the whole Church in Venezuela, on behalf of the Holy See or the Episcopal Conference. (Art. No. 2)

== Organization ==
- Plenary Assembly: supreme body of the CEV, consisting of all members of the CEV.
- Episcopal Commissions: Official study, monitoring and counseling, which provides for the CEV to meet the various pastoral fields.
- Standing Committee: Its purpose is to review and monitor the implementation and enforcement of the pastoral plan.
- Permanent Secretariat (SPEV) is a service agency of the Bishops Conference responsible for reporting, implement and coordinate the decisions and activities programadas.

== Political views ==
During the crisis in Venezuela, the CEV called for dialogue between the Venezuelan government and opposition in 2016. In 2017 Archbishop Diego Padrón, head of the Venezuelan Episcopal Conference, declared about the National Constituent Assembly: "This congress has been pushed forward by force and its result would be to render constitutional a military, socialist, Marxist and communist dictatorship". The same year, in November, Padrón would express doubt regarding the announced negotiations between both parties in the Dominican Republic, declaring that the dialogue between the two political sectors "has been devalued due to the general distrust that the people have in the actors", and that "no one believes the government, nor the opposition ... because they have hidden agendas". The CEV declared that the 2018 presidential elections did not have sufficient guarantees and asked that they took place in the last trimester of the year. Later that year, the CEV would suggest the opposition to "offer the people alternatives for change, and work harder for their well-being" while criticizing the government, saying "we live a de facto regime, without respect for the guarantees provided for in the Constitution and the highest principles of dignity of the people".

During the Venezuelan presidential crisis, on January 15, 2019, the CEV released a statement by Monsignor Ovidio Pérez Morales saying "The Church in Venezuela, united to its Bishops in communion with the Pope, declare the socialist-communist regime illegitimate and stand in solidarity with the Venezuelan people to rescue democracy, freedom, and justice. Trusting in God, they support the National Assembly". Cardinal Porras declared: "This regime always calls for dialogue when it's up to its neck in water but when the water level falls it forgets about it." After the 2020 National Assembly Delegated Committee election, the CEV warned that Luis Parra's election was "a new manifestation of the totalitarian ideology of those who hold political power. They have promoted and protected the non-recognition of the lack of autonomy of the legitimate National Assembly; and, at the same time, they intend to recognize leadership invalidly elected against all constitutional legality". The CEV would afterwards say the same year that the opposition should participate in Venezuela's electoral process "to overcome the totalitarian attempts and the advantage on the part of the government".

The Conference opposed abortion, same-sex marriage and euthanasia in a statement published in 2021.

In 2022, the Conference condemned the Russian invasion of Ukraine.
