= José Humberto Quintero Parra =

Venezuelan Cardinal

His Eminence José Humberto Quintero Parra
- Archbishop Emeritus of Caracas
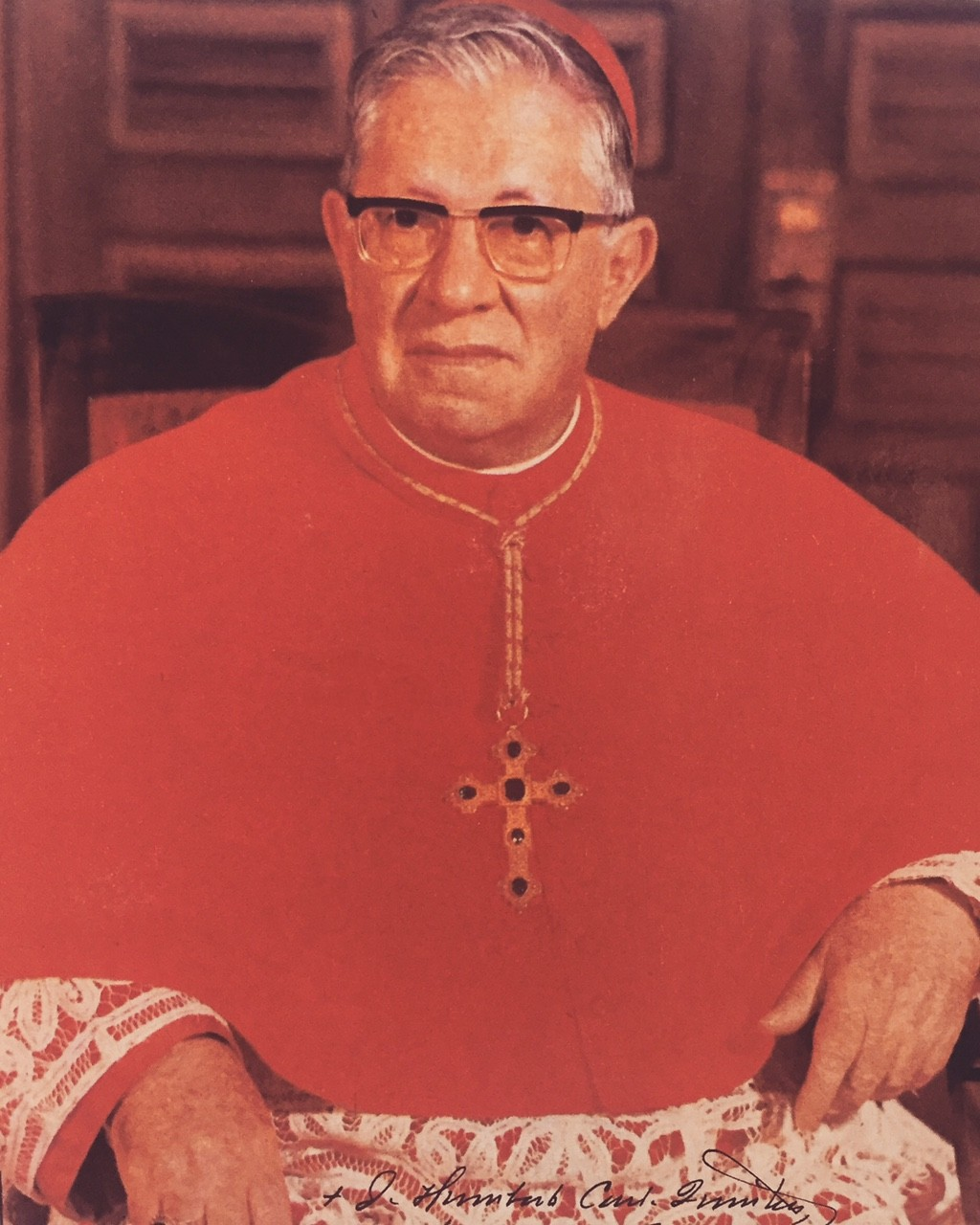
- The cardinal circa 1961.
- Church: Roman Catholic Church
- Archdiocese: Caracas
- See: Caracas
- Appointed: 31 August 1960
- Term ended: 24 May 1980
- Predecessor: Rafael Ignacio Arias Blanco
- Successor: José Alí Lebrún Moratinos
- Other post: Cardinal-Priest of Santi Andrea e Gregorio al Monte Celio (1961–84)
- Previous posts: Titular Archbishop of Acrida (1953–60); Coadjutor Archbishop of Mérida (1953–60); President of the Venezuelan Bishops' Conference (1961–72)

Orders
- Ordination: 22 August 1926 by Filippo Cortesi
- Consecration: 6 December 1953 by Adeodato Giovanni Piazza
- Created cardinal: 16 January 1961 by Pope John XXIII
- Rank: Cardinal-Priest

Personal details
- Born: José Humberto Quintero Parra; 22 September 1902 Mucuchíes, Mérida, Venezuela
- Died: 8 July 1984 (aged 81) Caracas, Venezuela
- Education: Pontifical Gregorian University
- Motto: Non ministrari sed ministrare
- Coat of arms: José Humberto Quintero Parra's coat of arms

Styles of José Quintero Parra
- Reference style: His Eminence
- Spoken style: Your Eminence
- Informal style: Cardinal
- See: Caracas (emeritus)

José Humberto Quintero Parra (22 September 1902 – 8 July 1984) was the first Venezuelan Cardinal of the Roman Catholic Church. He served as Archbishop of Caracas from 1960 to 1980, and was elevated to the cardinalate in 1961.

== Biography ==
José Quintero Parra was born in Mucuchíes, Mérida, to Genaro Quintero and his wife Perpetua Parra, and was later baptized on 31 October 1902. He studied at the seminary in Mérida and the Pontifical Gregorian University in Rome (from where he obtained his doctorates in theology and canon law) before being ordained to the priesthood by Archbishop Filippo Cortesi on 22 August 1926. Quintero then did pastoral work in Mérida until 1929, when he was named private secretary to the Archbishop of the same city, Acacio Chacón Guerra. Serving as Archbishop Chacón's secretary until 1934, he was also secretary of the archdiocesan curia and vicar general of Mérida from 1929 to 1953.

On 7 September 1953, Quintero was appointed Coadjutor Archbishop of Mérida and Titular Archbishop of Achrida by Pope Pius XII. He received his episcopal consecration on the following December 6 from Adeodato Giovanni Piazza, OCD, with Archbishops Luigi Centoz and Giuseppe Misuraca serving as co-consecrators, in the chapel of the Collegio Pio Latinoamericano at Rome. Quintero was later named Archbishop of Caracas on August 31, 1960.

Pope John XXIII created him Cardinal Priest of Ss. Andrea e Gregorio al Monte Celio in the consistory of 16 January 1961. Quintero, who was the first Venezuelan member of the College of Cardinals, attended the Second Vatican Council from 1962 to 1965, and was a cardinal elector in the 1963 papal conclave that selected Pope Paul VI. Along with Cardinal José Bueno y Monreal, he assisted Cardinal Paul Zoungrana in delivering one of the closing messages of the Council on 8 December 1965.

During his tenure as Caracas' archbishop, he made an offer of mediation to Venezuela's guerrillas, served as President of the Venezuelan Episcopal Conference, and enforced the "dignity and obligation of fatherhood". Before he resigned as Archbishop on 24 May 1980, after a period of twenty-nine years, the Venezuelan primate participated in the conclaves of August and October 1978, which selected Popes John Paul I and John Paul II respectively.

Quintero died after a long illness in Caracas, at age 81. He is buried in the chapel of Our Lady of the Pillar in the metropolitan cathedral of Caracas. President Jaime Lusinchi declared an official three days of mourning following the Cardinal's death.

== Trivia ==
- Quintero also served as Dean of the Law Faculty at Mérida University.
- He won scholarships for his education at Rome.
- The Cardinal was an amateur portrait painter.

Catholic Church titles
Preceded by Rafael Arias Blanco	Archbishop of Caracas; 1960–1980	Succeeded by José Lebrún Moratinos
