= List of Catholic dioceses in Venezuela =

Map of dioceses in Venezuela

The diocesan system of the Roman Catholic Church in Venezuela, united in the episcopal conference, comprises :

- nine Latin ecclesiastical provinces, each headed by a metropolitan (who has an archdiocese), including a total of 23 suffragan dioceses each headed by a bishop.
- four exempt Latin jurisdictions : the military ordinariate and three pre-diocesan apostolic vicariates.
- two Eastern Catholic exempt apostolic exarchates for rite-specific particular churches sui iuris

== Current Dioceses ==
=== Exempt Latin Sui iuris Jurisdictions ===
- Military Ordinariate of Venezuela, for the armed forces
- pre-diocesan missionary circumscriptions:
  - Vicariate Apostolic of Caroní
  - Vicariate Apostolic of Puerto Ayacucho
  - Vicariate Apostolic of Tucupita

=== Latin ecclesiastical provinces ===
==== Ecclesiastical province of Barquisimeto ====
- Metropolitan Archdiocese of Barquisimeto
  - Diocese of Acarigua–Araure
  - Diocese of Carora
  - Diocese of Guanare
  - Diocese of San Felipe

==== Ecclesiastical province of Calabozo ====
- Metropolitan Archdiocese of Calabozo
  - Diocese of San Fernando de Apure
  - Diocese of Valle de la Pascua

==== Ecclesiastical province of Caracas, Santiago de Venezuela ====
- Metropolitan Archdiocese of Caracas, Santiago de Venezuela
  - Diocese of Guarenas
  - Diocese of La Guaira
  - Diocese of Los Teques
  - Diocese of Petare

==== Ecclesiastical province of Ciudad Bolívar ====
- Metropolitan Archdiocese of Ciudad Bolívar
  - Diocese of Ciudad Guayana
  - Diocese of Maturín

==== Ecclesiastical province of Coro ====
- Metropolitan Archdiocese of Coro
  - Diocese of Punto Fijo

==== Ecclesiastical province of Cumana ====
- Metropolitan Archdiocese of Cumaná
  - Diocese of Barcelona
  - Diocese of Carúpano
  - Diocese of El Tigre
  - Diocese of Margarita

==== Ecclesiastical province of Maracaibo ====
- Metropolitan Archdiocese of Maracaibo
  - Diocese of Cabimas
  - Diocese of El Vigia-San Carlos del Zulia
  - Diocese of Machiques

==== Ecclesiastical province of Mérida ====
- Metropolitan Archdiocese of Mérida
  - Diocese of Barinas
  - Diocese of Guasdualito
  - Diocese of San Cristóbal de Venezuela
  - Diocese of Trujillo

==== Ecclesiastical province of Valencia en Venezuela ====
- Metropolitan Archdiocese of Valencia en Venezuela
  - Diocese of Maracay
  - Diocese of Puerto Cabello
  - Diocese of San Carlos de Venezuela

=== Eastern Catholic Sui iuris Jurisdictions ===
For rite-specific Particular churches sui iuris, subject to their Patriarchs :

Byzantine rite, under the Melkite Catholic Patriarchate of Antioch :

- Melkite Greek Catholic Apostolic Exarchate of Venezuela

Antiochian Rite, under the Syriac Catholic Patriarchate of Antioch :

- Syriac Catholic Apostolic Exarchate of Venezuela

== Defunct jurisdictions ==
There are no titular sees.

All former prelatures have current successor jurisdictions, mostly after promotion.

== Gallery of Archdiocesan sees ==
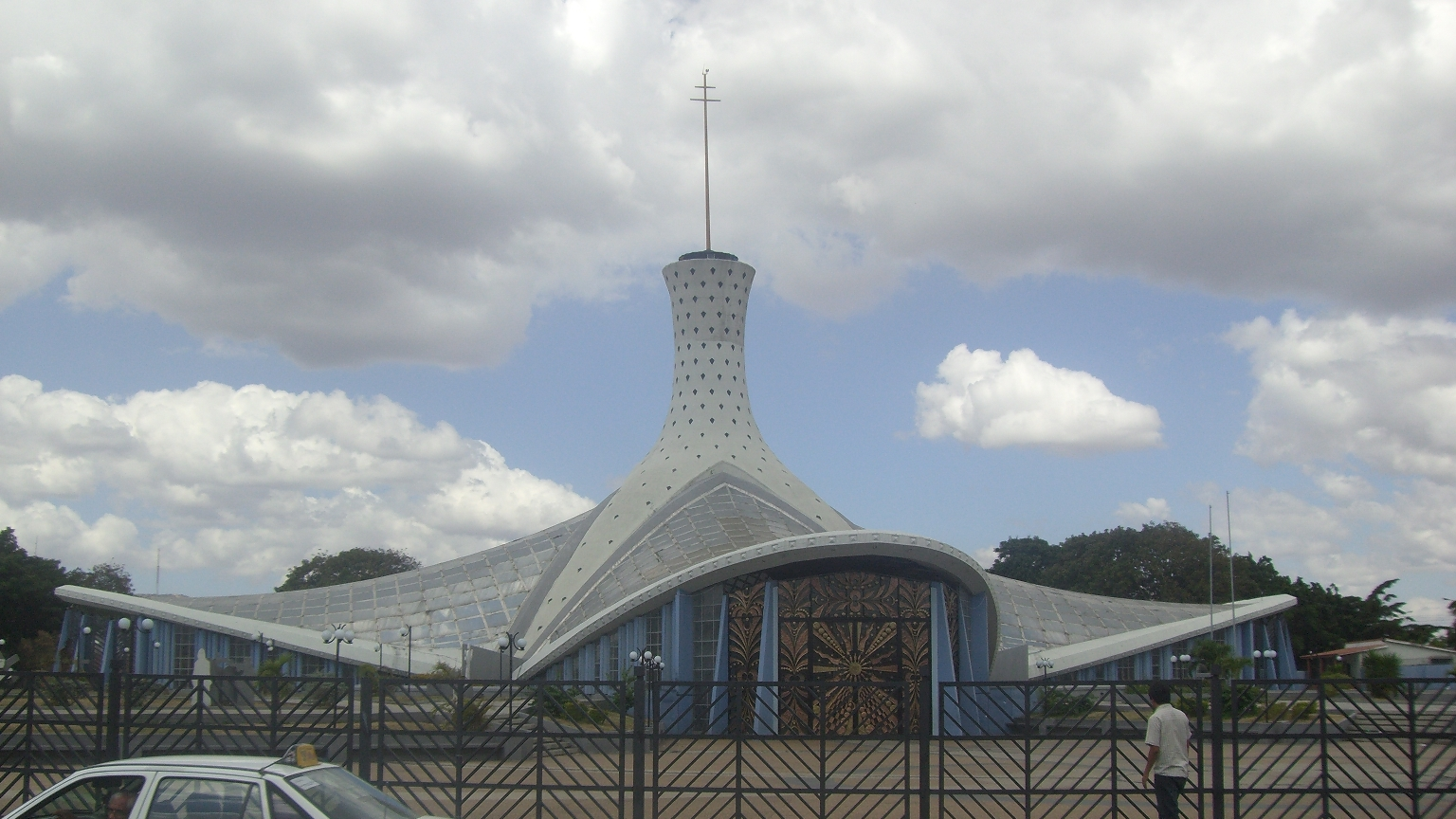
The seat of the Archdiocese of Barquisimeto is Catedral Nuestra Señora del Carmen.

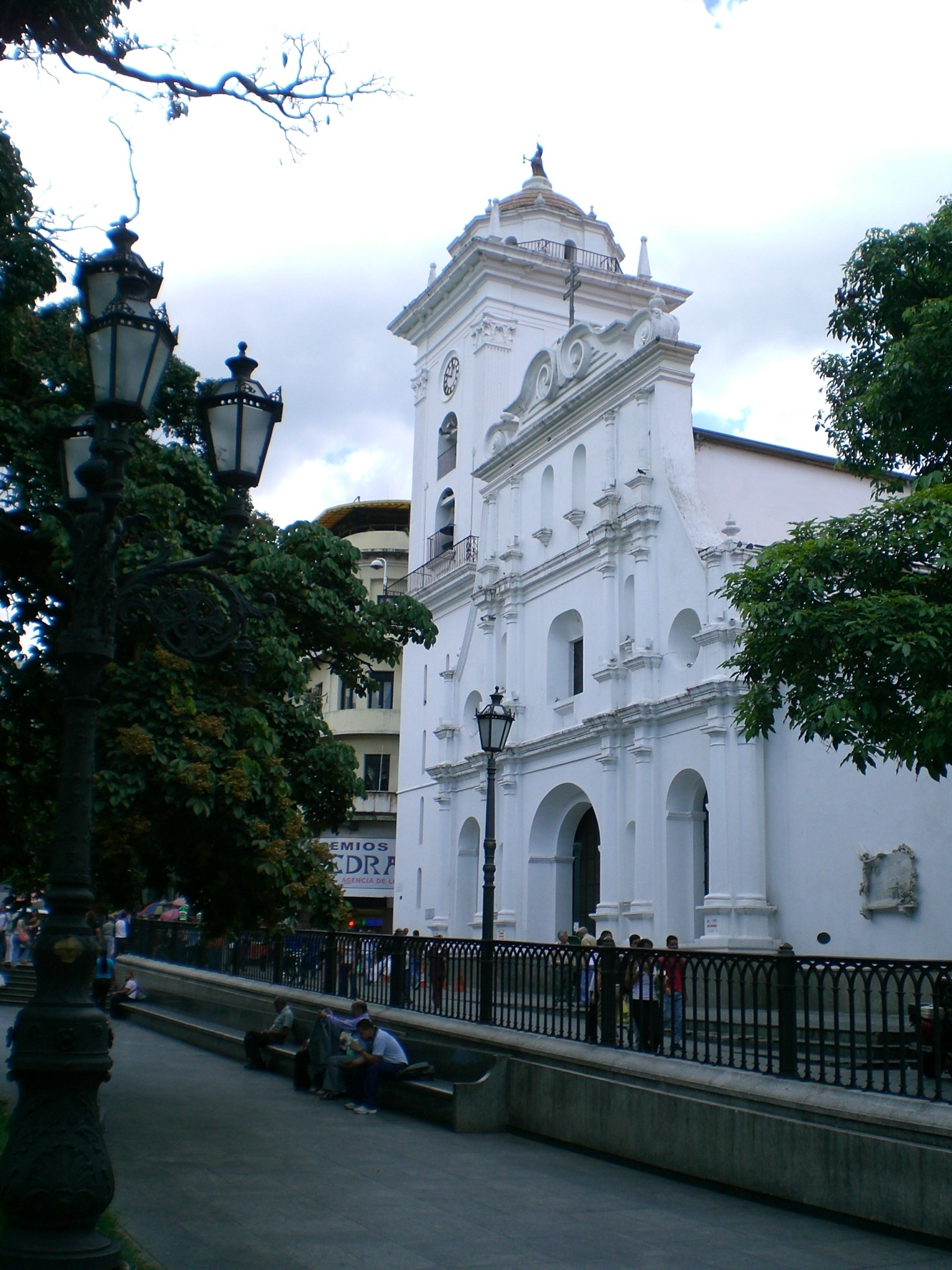
The seat of the Archdiocese of Caracas is Catedral Metropolitana de Santa Ana.

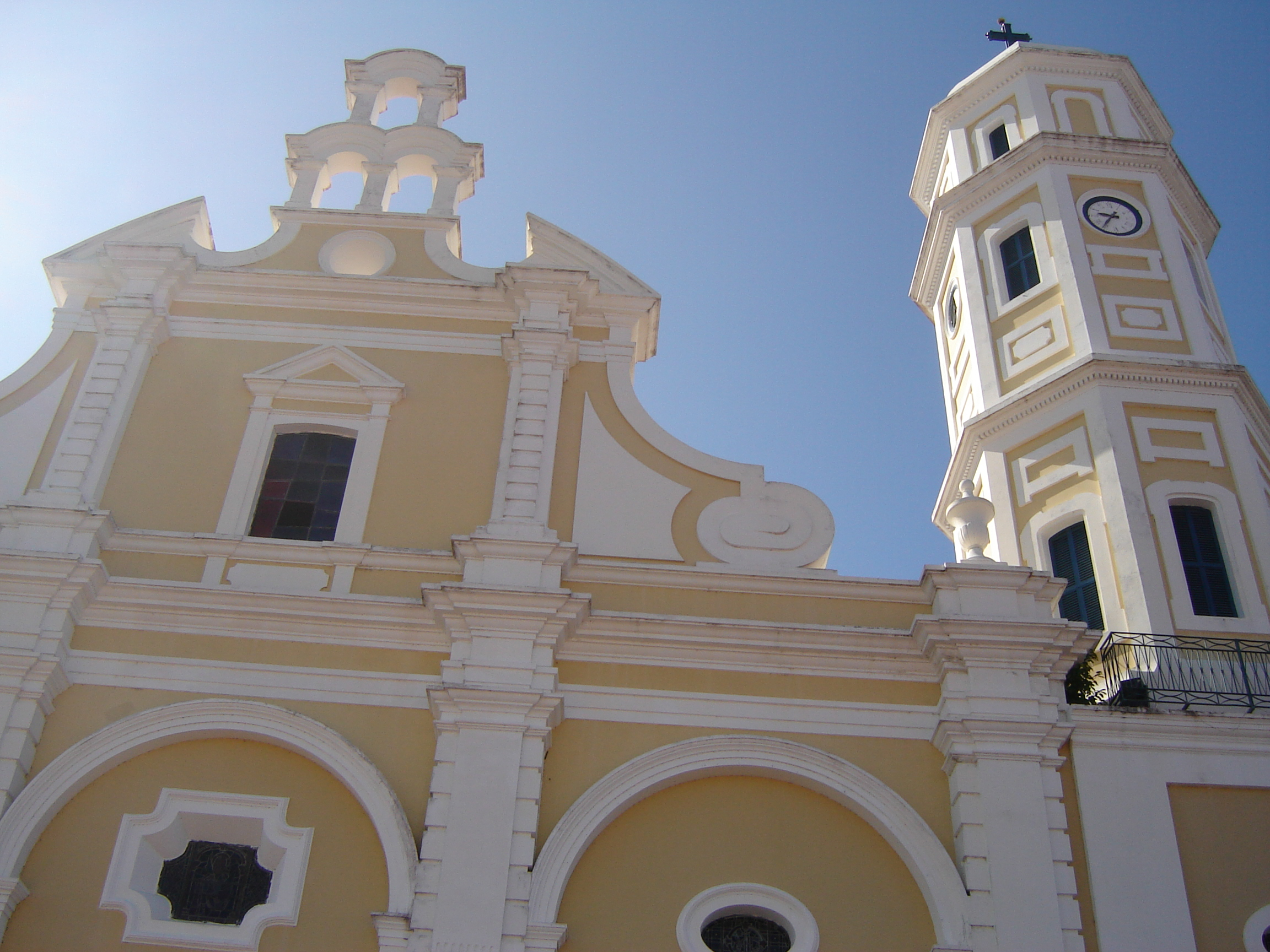
The seat of the Archdiocese of Ciudad Bolívar is Catedral de Santo Tomás.

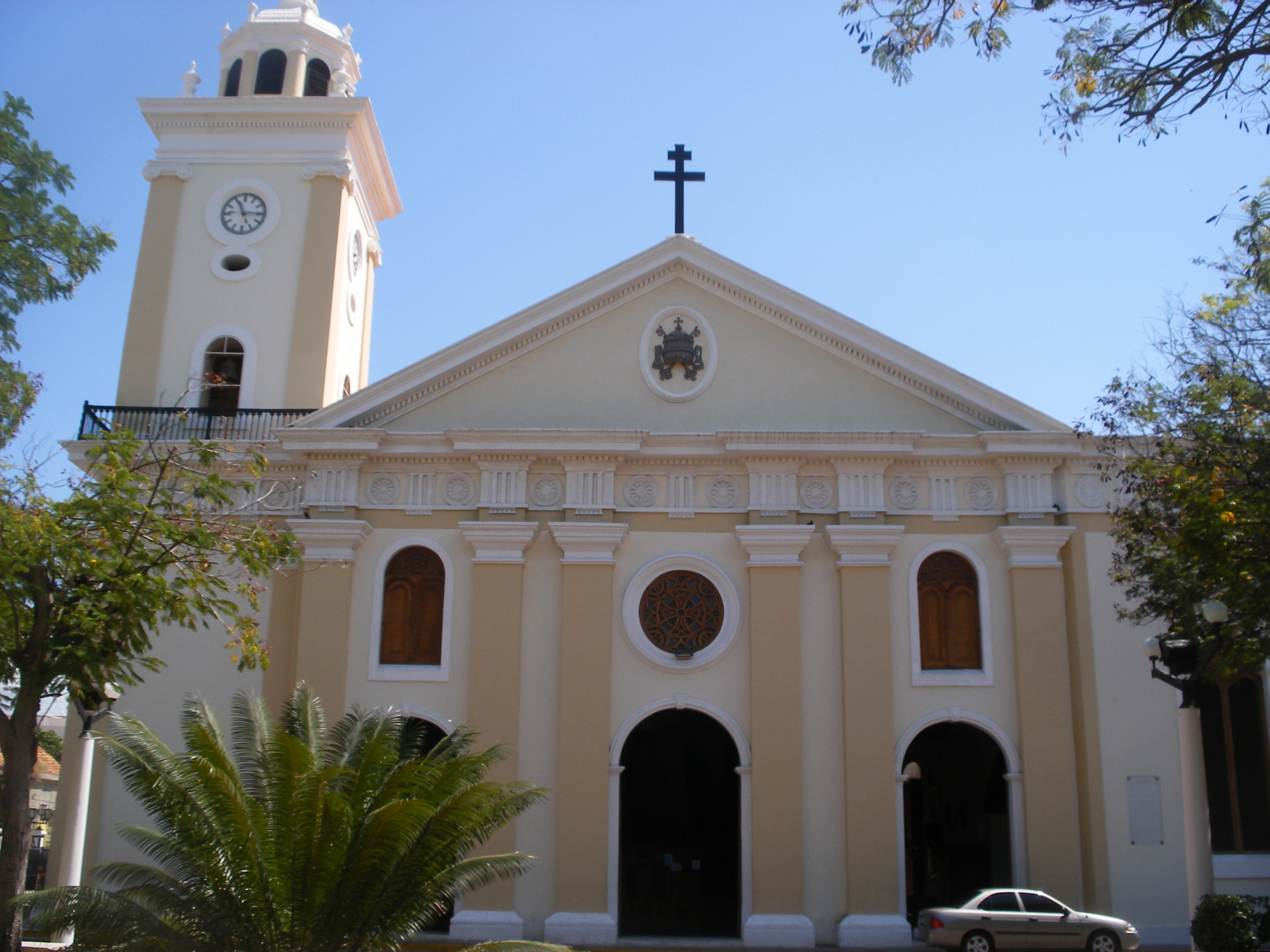
The seat of the Archdiocese of Maracaibo is Catedral de San Pedro y San Pablo.

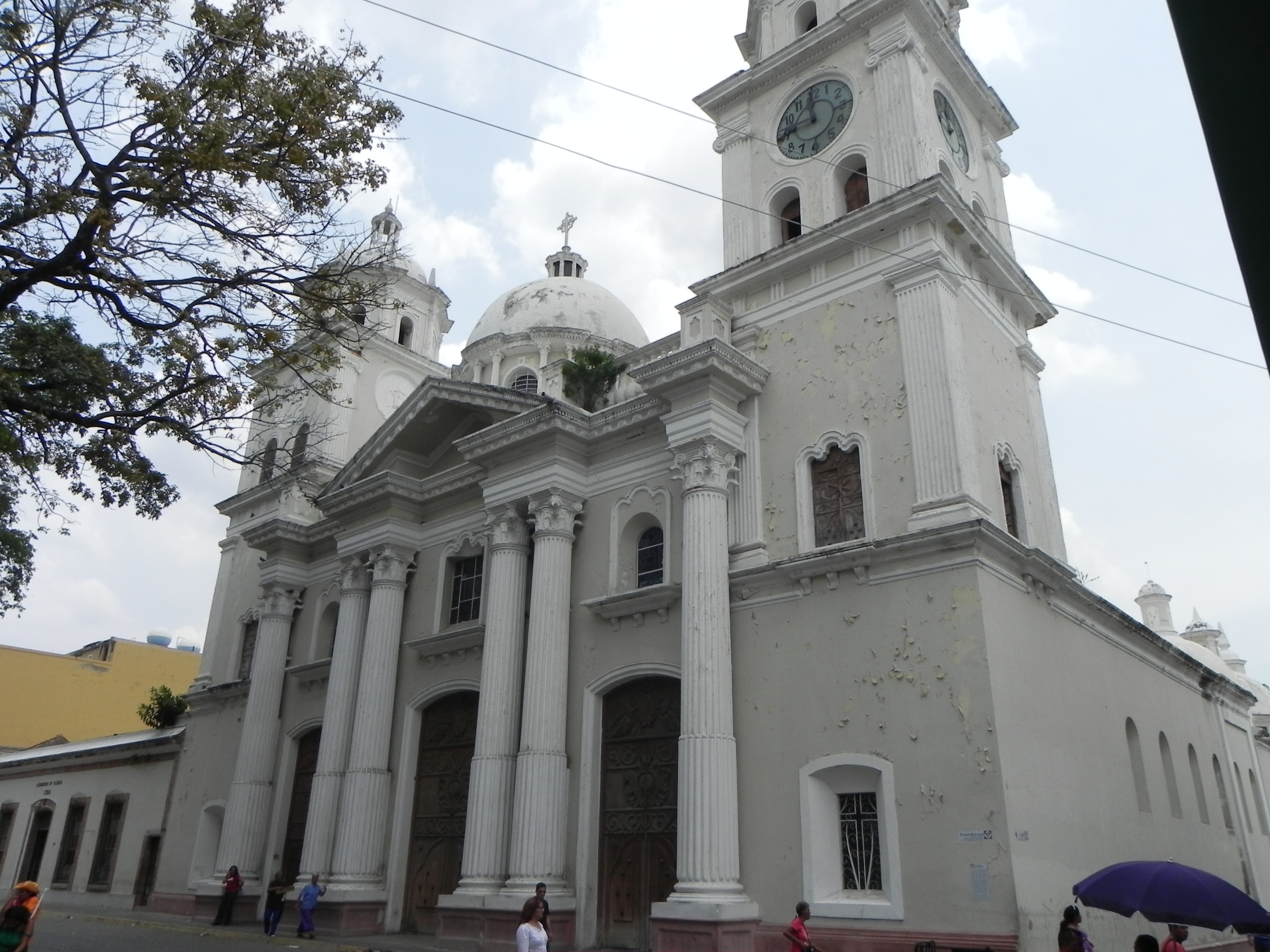
The seat of the Archdiocese of Valencia is Catedral Basílica de Nuestra Señora del Socorro.

== Sources and external links ==
- GCatholic.org.
- Catholic-Hierarchy entry ^{[self-published]}
