= Roberto Lückert León =

Venezuelan Roman Catholic prelate (1939–2024)

His Excellency Roberto Lückert León
- Archbishop of Coro
- Appointed: 23 November 1998
- Term ended: 25 October 2016
- Predecessor: Ramón Ovidio Pérez Morales (as Bishop of Coro)
- Successor: Mariano José Parra Sandoval
- Other post: Apostolic Administrator of Punto Fijo (2014–2016)
- Previous posts: Bishop of Cabimas (1985–1993); Bishop of Coro (1993–1998)

Orders
- Ordination: 14 August 1966
- Consecration: 29 June 1985 by Domingo Roa Pérez

Personal details
- Born: 9 December 1939 Maracaibo, Venezuela
- Died: 16 June 2024 (aged 84) Maracaibo, Venezuela
- Motto: Me desprendo de mi vida para tomarla de nuevo (I let go of my life to take it back).

Styles of Roberto Lückert León
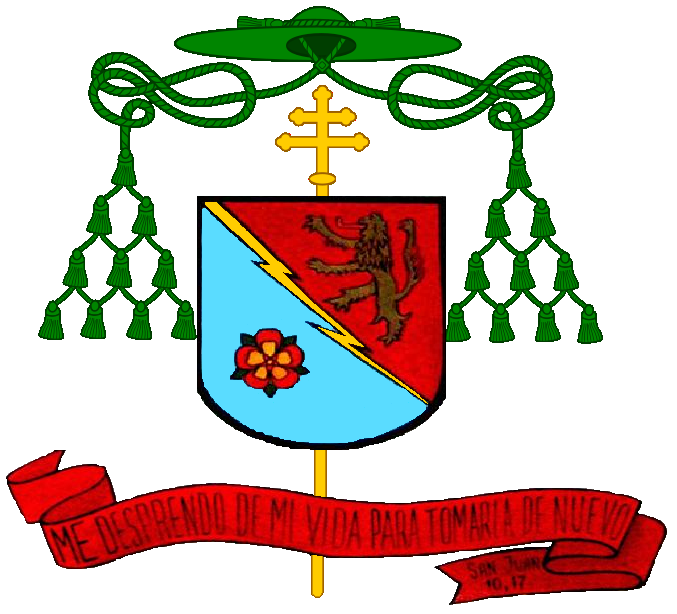
- Reference style: His Excellency; The Most Reverend
- Spoken style: Your Excellency
- Religious style: Archbishop

Roberto Lückert León (9 December 1939 – 16 June 2024) was a Venezuelan Catholic archbishop. He became the first Archbishop of the Archdiocese of Coro in the state of Falcón beginning on 23 November 1998. He was the second Vice-President of the Episcopal Conference of Venezuela. He was also described as a fervent defender of Venezuelan democracy.

== Early life ==
Lückert was born in Maracaibo in the state of Zulia on 9 December 1939 into a household of mixed religious beliefs. His father Walter, who had come to Venezuela from Germany, was Lutheran and his mother Carmen Alicia, from Trujillo, was Roman Catholic. He was the eldest of eight siblings. He had his primary and secondary education at the Colegio Gonzaga, which belonged to the Jesuits, in the city of Maracaibo. At the age of 18, he entered the minor seminary in his hometown and spent a year there. Later, at the interdiocesan Seminary of Saint Rose of Lima in Caracas, he studied theology and philosophy.

== Priesthood ==
On 14 August 1966, Lückert was ordained a priest by Domingo Roa Pérez, Archbishop of Maracaibo. He was named contributary vicar of the parish of Santa Bárbara in Zulia, and then economic vicar and finally a member of the team of priests at the Vocational Centre of the Archdiocese of Maracaibo. He was the parish priest at Our Lady of Lourdes (Nuestra Señora de Lourdes), Maracaibo, in 1970, and in 1972 he founded the parish of Saint John the Baptist (San Juan Bautista), also in Maracaibo. He was rector and priest of the Basilica of Our Lady of Chiquinquirá in Maracaibo (1972–1977) when he was chosen by Domingo Roa Pérez as the archdiocese's vicar general and director of the Catholic newspaper La Columna. Later, in 1980, he went back to his post as priest at the Basilica while still keeping these two other positions.

== Bishop of Cabimas ==
On 27 April 1985, Pope John Paul II named Lückert the third Bishop of the Diocese of Cabimas.

He received his episcopal ordination on 29 June from Domingo Roa Pérez. The co-consecrators were Mariano José Parra León, Bishop of Cumaná, and Baltazar Enrique Porras Cardozo, Auxiliary Bishop of Mérida.

== Bishop and Archbishop of Coro ==
On 21 July 1993, Pope John Paul II named Lückert Bishop of Coro.

On 23 November 1998, the Diocese of Coro was raised to Metropolitan Archdiocese, and on 20 February 1999 Lückert was named Archbishop of Coro at St. Anne's Cathedral in Coro.

On 29 June 1999, Pope John Paul II bestowed upon Lückert the archbishop's pallium in Vatican City.

On 18 February 2014, Lückert was made the apostolic administrator of Punto Fijo, taking over from Juan María Leonardi Villasmil, who had been having serious health problems

Pope Francis accepted Lückert's resignation on 25 October 2016 and named Mariano José Parra Sandoval to succeed him in October 2016.

== Communication and media ==
Lückert was known as a "born communicator". He was president of the episcopate's media commission, and of the communication department of the Episcopal Conference of Latin America (Celam).

Lückert was not one to keep quiet when he saw injustice or other wrongdoing in his country. He had several verbal clashes with the late president Hugo Chávez when Lückert was first vice-president of the Episcopate from 2006 to 2009.

In August 2015, when Lückert was Archbishop of Coro, he denounced what he saw as Venezuela's conversion into a "communist country" as a result of Hugo Chávez's and Nicolás Maduro's persistence in "wanting to copy the Cuban model and that has led to a deep economic crisis." In November 2017, Lückert raised concerns that the new Law against Hatred was in fact an attempt by the government to muzzle the country's opposition. In January 2019, Lückert was stern in his remarks about the detention of some 80 minors by Maduro's régime, rejecting the action with the force that he felt it deserved.

At the time of Lückert's death, Corina Yoris hailed the archbishop as a strong defender of Venezuelans' human rights.

== Honours and recognition ==
On 25 June 2010, to mark Lückert's silver anniversary of being consecrated a bishop, he was awarded the title Illustrious Son of Zulia by that state's administration, under Decree number 400.

Under Decree number 780 on 31 July 2012, Los Háticos Avenue in Maracaibo was named after Lückert in recognition of the above title and also in honour of his exemplary priestly career, his integrity, his valour and his widely acknowledged struggles in strengthening Venezuelan democracy.

== Death ==
Lückert died at a hospital in Maracaibo, on 16 June 2024, at the age of 84. He had been suffering respiratory problems, severe enough to warrant a tracheotomy. A statement issued by the Venezuelan Catholic episcopate said that the prelate's legacy would live on in the causes that he defended with courage: the poor, democracy and the faith.

Catholic Church titles
Preceded by (new archdiocese)	I Archbishop of Coro; 1998–2015	Succeeded by Mariano José Parra Sandoval
Preceded by Ramón Ovidio Pérez Morales	IV Bishop of Coro; 1993–1998	Succeeded by (diocese became archdiocese)
Preceded by Marco Tulio Ramírez Roa	III Bishop of Cabimas; 1985–1993	Succeeded by Freddy Jesús Fuenmayor Suárez
