= Theuzi =

Africa Proconsularis (125 AD)

Theuzi is a former ancient city and bishopric in Roman Africa and present Latin Catholic titular see.

Its modern location is unclear, but is believed to have been somewhere in present Tunisia.

== History ==
Aquae Novae was important enough in the Roman province of Africa Proconsularis to become one of the many suffragans of its capital Carthage's Metropolitan Archbishopric, but faded.

== Titular see ==
The diocese was nominally restored in 1933 as a titular bishopric (Teuzi in Curiate Italian).

It has had the following incumbents, all of the lowest (episcopal) rank :

- Jorge Solórzano Pérez (2000.06.17 – 2005.10.15)
- José Luis Mollaghan (1993.07.22 – 2000.05.17) as Auxiliary Bishop of Buenos Aires (Argentina) (1993.07.22 – 2000.05.17); later Bishop of San Miguel (Argentina) (2000.05.17 – 2005.12.22), Metropolitan Archbishop of Rosario (Argentina) (2005.12.22 – 2014.05.19), Member of College for the review of appeals by clergy accused of delicta graviora (2015.01.21 – ...)
- Antonio José López Castillo (1988.02.26 – 1992.08.01) as Auxiliary Bishop of Maracaibo (Venezuela) (1988.02.26 – 1992.08.01); later Bishop of Barinas (Venezuela) (1992.08.01 – 2001.12.27), Metropolitan Archbishop of Calabozo (Venezuela) (2001.12.27 – 2007.12.22), Metropolitan Archbishop of Barquisimeto (Venezuela) (2007.12.22 – ...)
- Eduardo Pedro Martínez y Dalmau, Passionists (C.P.) (1961.03.16 – 1987.11.19)
- Andrzej Siemieniewski (2006.01.05 – ...), Auxiliary Bishop of Wrocław (Poland)

== Source and external links ==
- GCatholic with titular incumbent biography links
