= Vicente Ramón Hernández Peña =

Venezuelan Roman Catholic bishop (1935–2018)

- Bishop of Trujillo, Venezuela
- Church: Catholic Church
- Diocese: Diocese of Trujillo, Venezuela
- In office: 11 June 1982 – 3 April 2012
- Predecessor: José León Rojas Chaparro
- Successor: Cástor Oswaldo Azuaje Pérez
- Previous posts: Coadjutor Bishop of Trujillo, Venezuela (1976-1982); Titular Bishop of Sullectum (1974-1982); Auxiliary Bishop of Caracas (1974-1976)

Orders
- Ordination: 2 October 1960
- Consecration: 25 July 1974 by Antonio del Giudice

Personal details
- Born: 19 July 1935 Boconó, Trujillo, United States of Venezuela
- Died: 25 March 2018 (aged 82) Trujillo, Trujillo, Bolivarian Republic of Venezuela

Vicente Ramón Hernández Peña (19 July 1935 – 25 March 2018) was a Roman Catholic bishop.

Hernández Peña was ordained to the priesthood in 1960. From 1974 to 1982, he served as titular bishop of Sullectum and auxiliary bishop of the Roman Catholic Archdiocese of Caracas, Venezuela. Hernández Peña then served as coadjutor bishop of the Roman Catholic Diocese of Trujillo, Venezuela and as bishop of the diocese from 1982 to 2012.
