= Archdiocese of Mérida =

Archdiocese of Mérida may refer to:

- Roman Catholic Archdiocese of Mérida-Badajoz in Spain
- Roman Catholic Archdiocese of Mérida in Venezuela
