= Machiques Cathedral =

Our Lady of Mount Carmel Cathedral
- Catedral de Nuestra Señora del Carmen
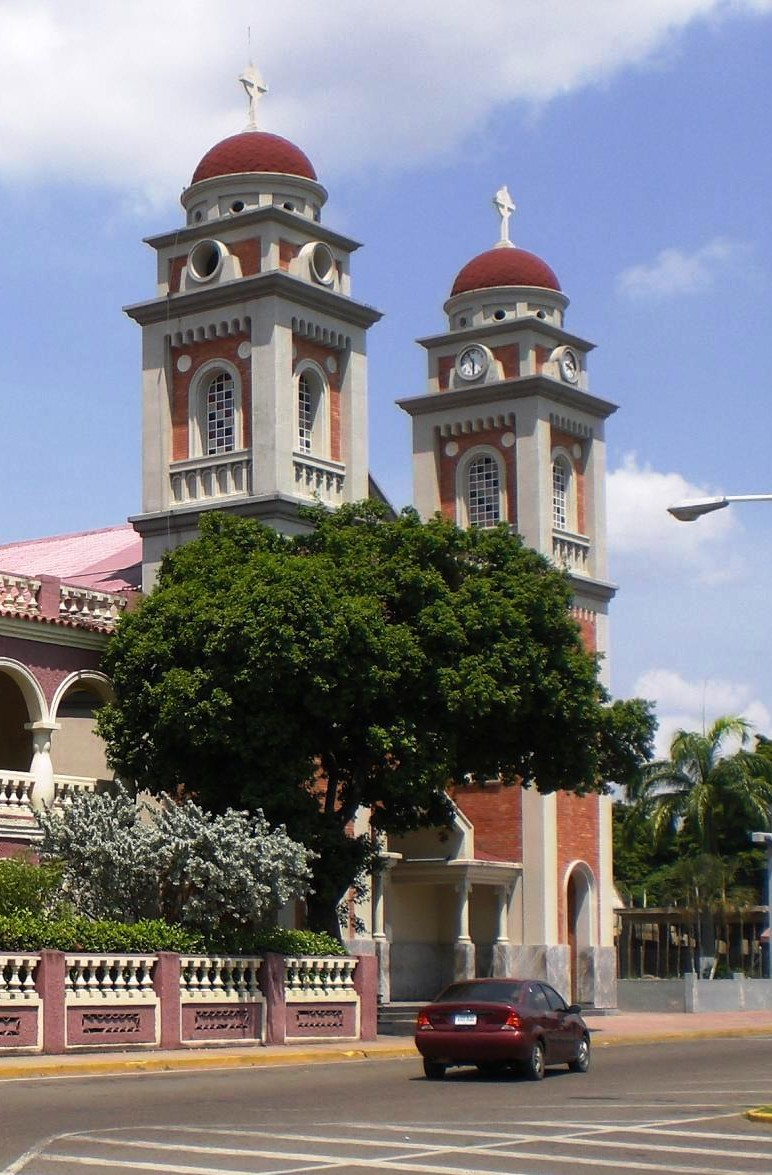
- Our Lady of Mount Carmel Cathedral
- Location: Machiques, Zulia state
- Country: Venezuela
- Denomination: Roman Catholic Church

The Our Lady of Mount Carmel Cathedral (Spanish: Catedral de Nuestra Señora del Carmen) Also Machiques Cathedral is the catheral that is affiliated with the Catholic Church and is located between Páez and Sucre Streets and avenues Santa Teresa and Artes on one side of the Bolivar Square in the city of Machiques, in the municipality Machiques de Périja in western Zulia state, in the Zulia Region one of the administrative political divisions of the South American country of Venezuela.

The religious building is governed by the Roman or Latin rite and functions as the cathedral of the Diocese of Machiques (Dioecesis Machiquesensis) that was created on April 9, 2011, by bull Cum Vicariatus of Pope Benedict XVI replacing the vicariate apostolic previously existing in the same jurisdiction.

It is under the pastoral responsibility of the Bishop Jesús Alfonso Guerrero Contreras. In 2015 the Cathedral celebrated 125 years of its foundation with various activities such as Masses, prayer chains, adoration, fundraising to help other churches, etc.

== See also ==
- List of cathedrals in Venezuela
- Our Lady of Mount Carmel
- Roman Catholicism in Venezuela
