= Víctor Manuel Pérez Rojas =

Venezuelan Catholic prelate (1940–2019)

- Bishop of San Fernando de Apure
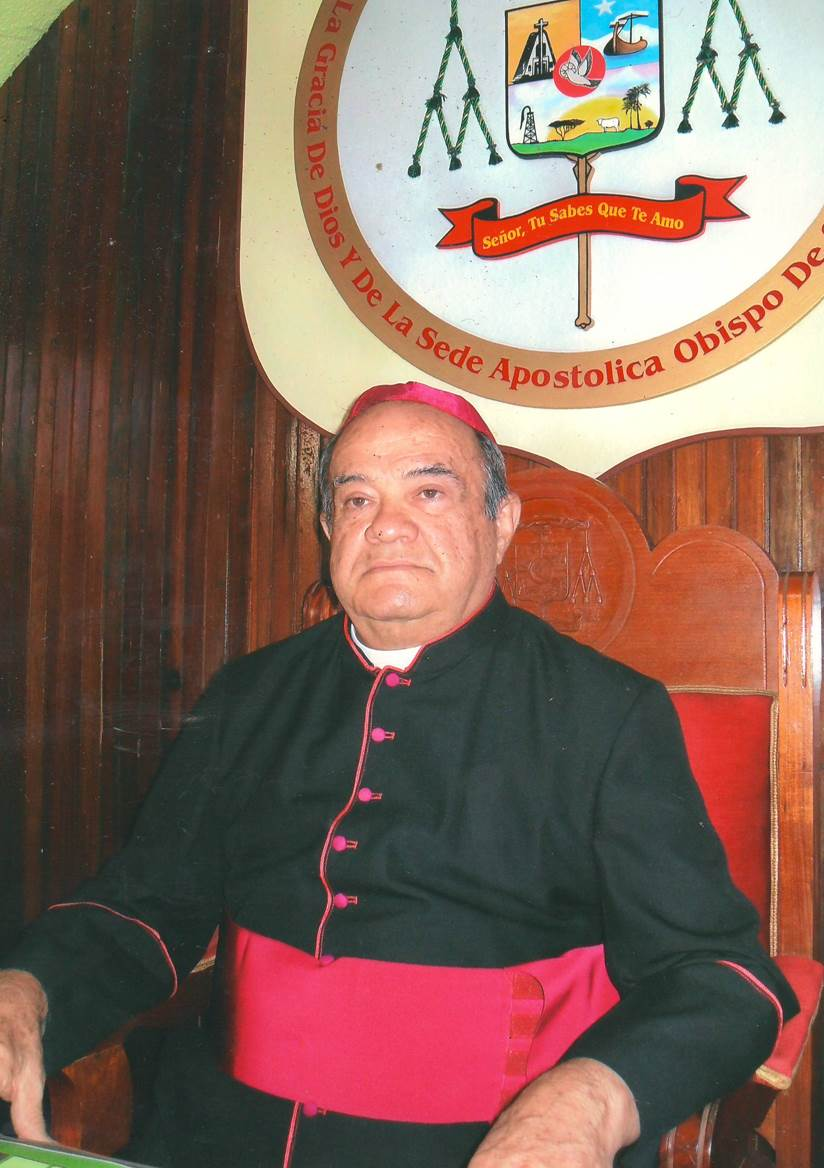
- Bishop Pérez Rojas in 2015
- Church: Catholic Church
- Diocese: Diocese of San Fernando de Apure
- In office: 7 November 2001 – 15 July 2016
- Predecessor: Mariano José Parra Sandoval
- Successor: Alfredo Torres
- Previous posts: Titular Bishop of Tagaria (1998-2001); Auxiliary Bishop of Calabozo (1998-2001)

Orders
- Ordination: 11 September 1965
- Consecration: 23 June 1998 by Helímenas de Jesús Rojo Paredes

Personal details
- Born: 17 October 1940 Las Mercedes del Llano, Guárico, United States of Venezuela
- Died: 12 November 2019 (aged 79) Caracas, Venezuela

Victor Manuel Pérez Rojas (17 October 1940 – 12 November 2019) was a Venezuelan Catholic prelate.

Pérez Rojas was born in Venezuela and was ordained to the priesthood in 1965. He served as titular bishop of Tagaria and was auxiliary bishop of the Roman Catholic Archdiocese of Calabozo, Venezuela from 1998 to 2001. He then served as bishop of the Roman Catholic Diocese of San Fernando de Apure, Venezuela, from 2001 to 2016.
