= Cathedral of Our Lady of the Pillar, Barinas =

Cathedral of Our Lady of the Pillar
- Catedral de Nuestra Señora del Pilar
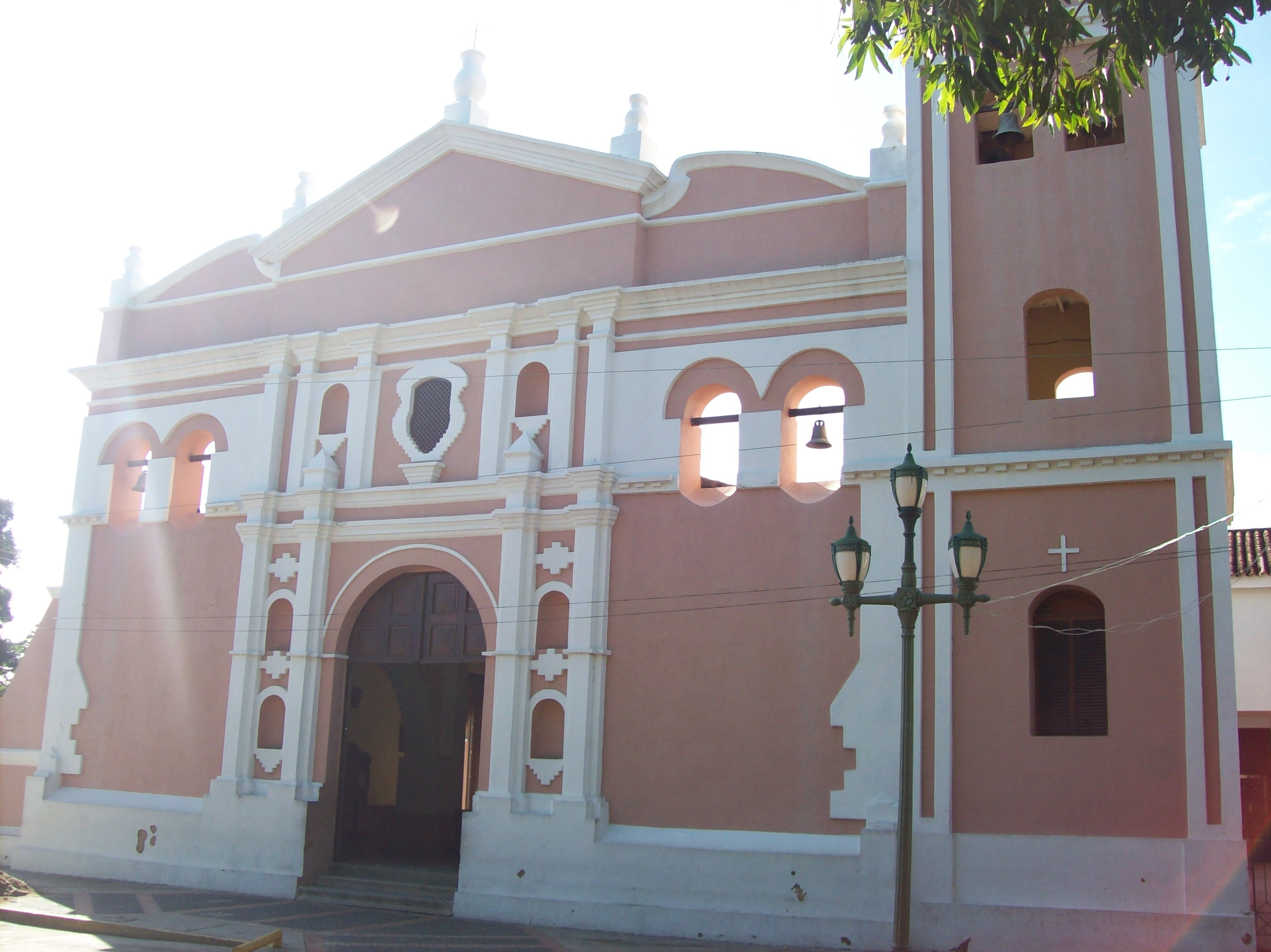
- Cathedral of Our Lady of the Pillar
- 8°37′53″N 70°12′33″W
- Location: Barinas
- Country: Venezuela
- Denomination: Roman Catholic Church

The Cathedral of Our Lady of the Pillar (Spanish: Catedral de Nuestra Señora del Pilar), or simply Cathedral of Barinas, is a religious building belonging to the Catholic Church and is located in Briceño Mendez Avenue in front of Bolivar Square in the city of Barinas, the capital of Barinas State in the plains region of the South American country of Venezuela.

The cathedral follows the Roman or Latin rite and serves as the seat of the Diocese of Barinas (Dioecesis Barinensis) that was created on July 23, 1965, with the papal bull Apostolicum munus of Pope Paul VI. It is under the pastoral responsibility of the Bishop Jesús Alfonso Guerrero Contreras, O.F.M. Cap. As its name implies was dedicated to the Virgin Mary in her title of Our Lady of the Pillar.

It is a structure dating from the Spanish colonial era, having been built between 1770 and 1780. It is an important tourist attraction and a religious monument of great historical value.

== See also ==
- List of cathedrals in Venezuela
- Our Lady of the Pillar
- Roman Catholicism in Venezuela
