= Villasmil =

Villasmil is a surname. Notable people with the surname include:

- Juan María Leonardi Villasmil (1947–2014), Roman Catholic bishop
- Mariángel Villasmil (born 1996), Venezuelan model
- Solenny Villasmil (born 1981), Venezuelan weightlifter
