= Diocese of El Vigía–San Carlos del Zulia =

Roman Catholic diocese in Venezuela

Coordinates: 8.6183°N 71.6494°W

Diocese of El Vigia-San Carlos del Zulia Dioecesis Vigilantis-Sancti Caroli Zuliensis Diócesis de El Vigía-San Carlos del Zulia

Catholic
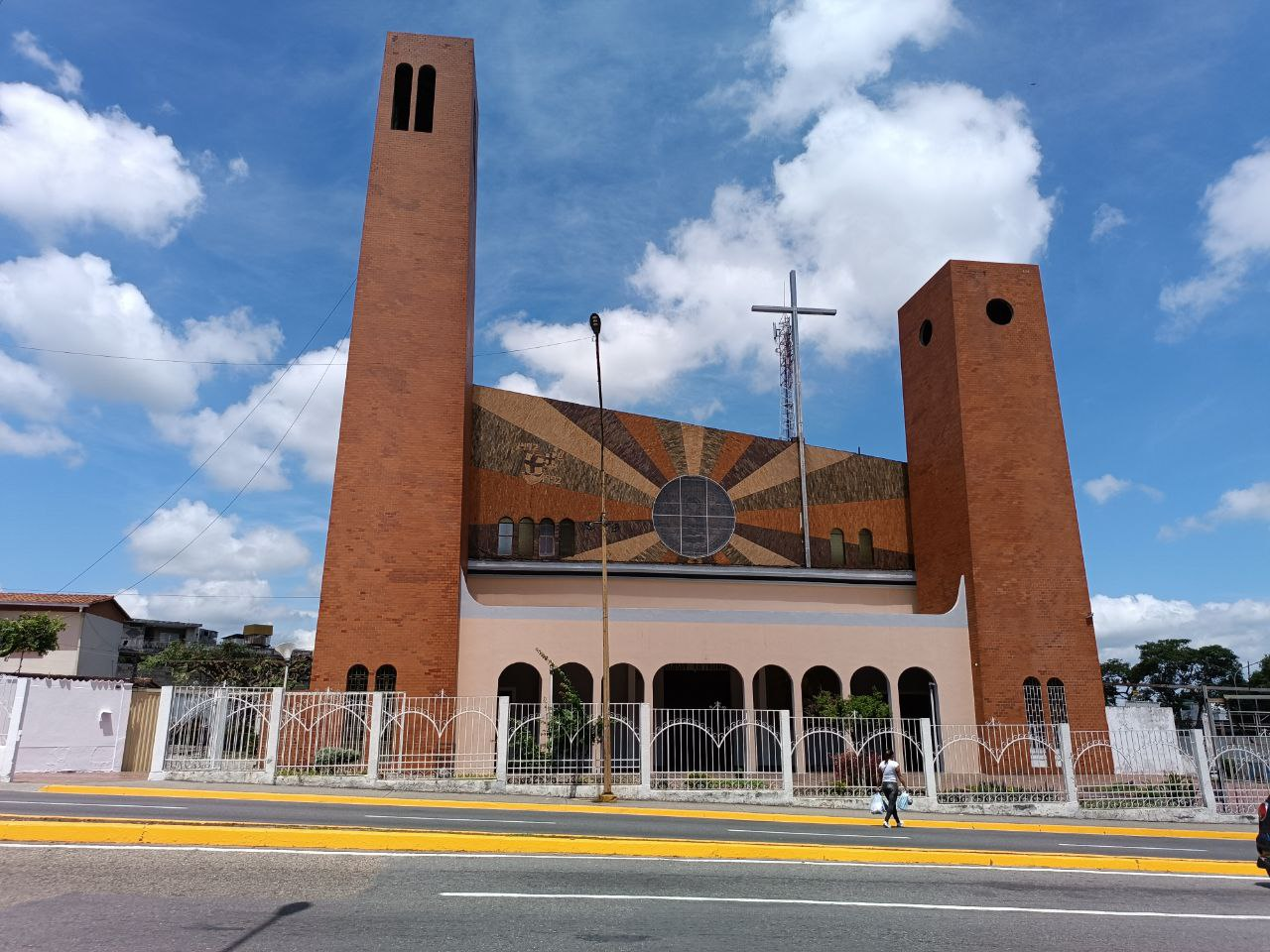

Location
- Country: Venezuela
- Metropolitan: Archdiocese of Maracaibo
- Headquarters: El Vigía (northwest of Lagunillas), Mérida, Venezuela

Statistics
- Area: 8,057 km^{2} (3,111 sq mi)
- Population: Total; Catholics: (as of 2023); 561,000; 438,800 (78.2%)
- Parishes: 33

Information
- Denomination: Catholic Church
- Sui iuris church: Latin Church
- Rite: Roman Rite
- Established: 7 July 1994; 32 years ago
- Cathedral: Our Lady of Perpetual Help Cathedral, El Vigia
- Patron saint: Our Lady of Perpetual Help
- Secular priests: 37 Diocesan

Current leadership
- Pope: Leo XIV
- Bishop: Sede vacante
- Metropolitan Archbishop: José Luis Azuaje Ayala

The Roman Catholic Diocese of El Vigia-San Carlos del Zulia (Latin: Dioecesis Dioecesis Vigilantis-Sancti Caroli Zuliensis) is a diocese located in the cities of El Vigía and San Carlos del Zulia in the Roman Catholic Archdiocese of Maracaibo in Venezuela.

== History ==
On 7 July 1994, Blessed John Paul II established the Diocese of El Vigia–San Carlos del Zulia from the Diocese of Cabimas, Metropolitan Archdiocese of Maracaibo and Metropolitan Archdiocese of Mérida.

== Leadership ==
=== Bishops of El Vigia–San Carlos del Zulia ===
- William Delgado Silva (14 April 1999 – 26 July 2005), appointed Bishop of Cabimas
- José Luis Azuaje Ayala (15 July 2006 – 30 August 2013), appointed Bishop of Barinas
- Juan de Dios Peña Rojas (17 April 2015 – 29 July 2026), appointed Bishop of Barinas

=== Another priest of this diocese who became bishop ===
- Víctor Hugo Basabe (2000-2016), appointed Bishop of San Felipe in 2016

== See also ==
- Roman Catholicism in Venezuela
