= Diocese of Mérida =

The Diocese of Mérida can refer to:

- Roman Catholic Archdiocese of Mérida-Badajoz in Spain
- Roman Catholic Archdiocese of Mérida in Venezuela
