= Our Lady of the Rosary Cathedral, Cabimas =

Our Lady of the Rosary Cathedral
- Catedral Nuestra Señora del Rosario
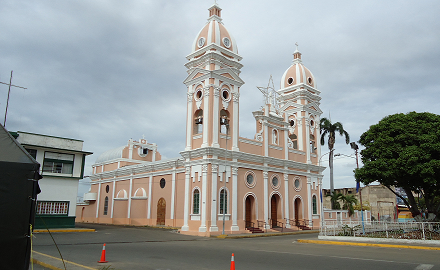
- Our Lady of the Rosary Cathedral
- 10.3903°N 71.4678°W
- Location: Cabimas
- Country: Venezuela
- Denomination: Roman Catholic Church

Administration
- Diocese: Roman Catholic Diocese of Cabimas

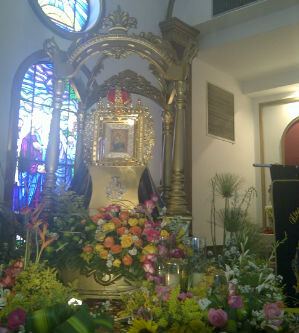
Internal view

The Our Lady of the Rosary Cathedral (Spanish: Catedral Nuestra Señora del Rosario) or simply Cathedral of Cabimas (more formally called Cathedral of Our Lady of the Rosary Church of Cabimas), is the Mother Church of Cabimas, in the state of Zulia in Venezuela. Is a nineteenth-century building and is the seat of the Roman Catholic Diocese of Cabimas.

== History ==
The initiative to build a church in Cabimas, emerged from a faithful called Juana Villasmil, who organized the recitation of the Rosary in private homes. Lady Juana of his own money, he commanded a humble church building mud walls and thatched roof in 1829 and wrote to Bishop Rafael Laso de la Vega asking for a priest. In 1829 the humble church was consecrated to the Virgin of the Rosary and its first priest was the priest Juan de Dios Castro.

In 1840 the Bishop José Vicente de Unda García elevated the church to a parish. From humble beginnings the church was improved and expanded with the contributions of the faithful agencies and institutions. In old photographs of 1930 it can be seen without her church towers. In 1934 begins the construction of the first of its towers, designed by architect Jesus Borjas Pedreañez and built by Manuel Estrada. The construction of the present structure took more than 30 years. In 1965 remodeling its present form with the 2 towers, the altar, and the ship was finished that year with the creation of the Diocese of Cabimas the church was elevated to cathedral.

== See also ==
- List of cathedrals in Venezuela
- Our Lady of the Rosary
- Roman Catholicism in Venezuela
