= Diocese of Machiques =

Roman Catholic diocese in Venezuela

Diocese of Machiques Dioecesis Machiquesensis

Catholic

Location
- Country: Venezuela
- Metropolitan: Maracaibo

Statistics
- Area: 25,300 km^{2} (9,800 sq mi)
- Population: Total; Catholics: (as of 2023); 359,918; 292,000 (81.1%)
- Parishes: 17

Information
- Denomination: Catholic Church
- Sui iuris church: Latin Church
- Rite: Roman Rite
- Established: 26 May 1943; 83 years ago
- Cathedral: Our Lady of Mount Carmel Cathedral
- Secular priests: 17 (14 Diocesan, 3 Religious Orders)

Current leadership
- Pope: Leo XIV
- Bishop: sede vacante
- Metropolitan Archbishop: José Luis Azuaje Ayala
- Bishops emeritus: Ramiro Díaz Sánchez, OMI

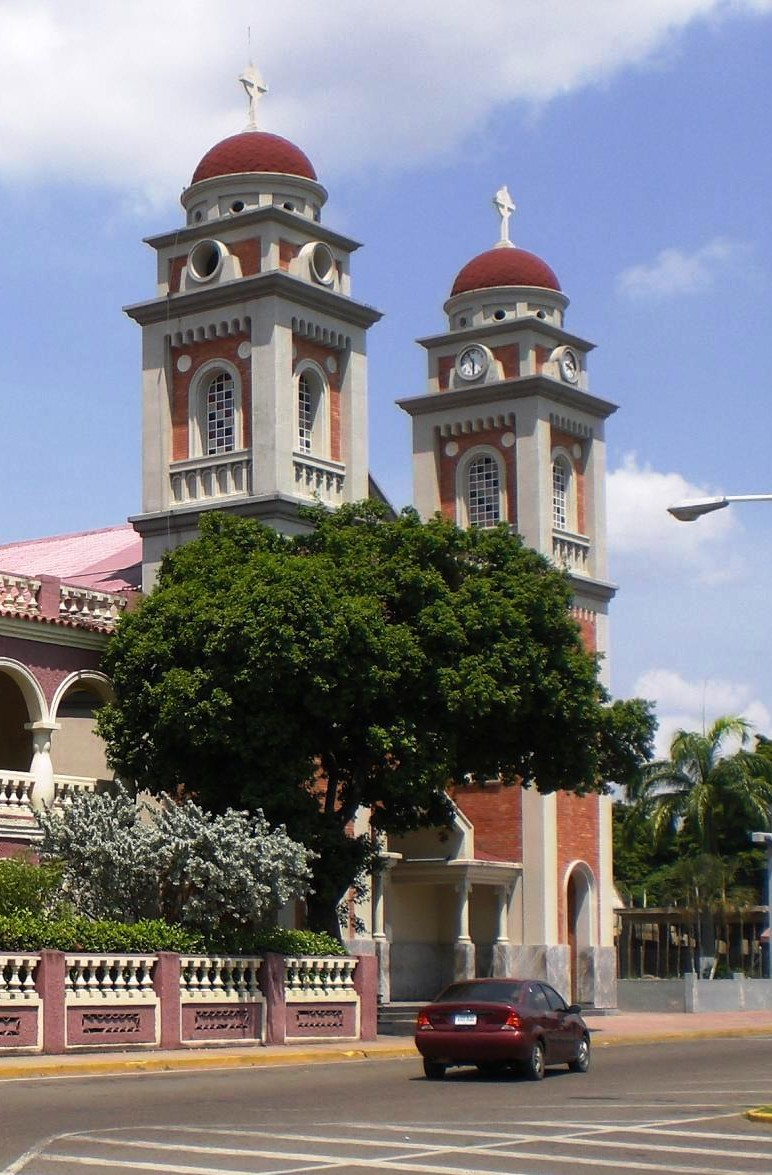
Cathedral of Our Lady of Mount Carmel in Machiques

The Roman Catholic Diocese of Machiques (Latin: Dioecesis Machiquesensis) is a diocese located in the Roman Catholic Archdiocese of Maracaibo in Venezuela.

== History ==
- 26 May 1943: Pope Pius XII erected the Apostolic Vicariate of Machiques.
- 9 April 2011: The Vicariate was elevated to the Diocese of Machiques by Pope Benedict XVI.

== Ordinaries ==
Apostolic Vicars of Machiques (Roman Rite)

- Ángel Turrado Moreno, OFMCap (4 Sep 1944 – Jan 1954), resigned
- Miguel Saturnino Aurrecoechea Palacios, OFMCap (19 Dec 1955 – 10 Mar 1986), retired
- Agustín Romualdo Alvarez Rodríguez, OFMCap (10 Mar 1986 – 7 Oct 1995), resigned
- Ramiro Díaz Sánchez, OMI (24 Jan 1997 – 9 Apr 2011), retired

Bishops of Machiques (Roman Rite)

- Jesús Alfonso Guerrero Contreras, OFMCap (9 Apr 2011 – 21 Dec 2018), appointed Bishop of Barinas
  - Apostolic Administrator Ramiro Díaz Sánchez, OMI (15 Mar 2019 – 14 Dec 2019), Vicar Apostolic Emeritus of Machiques
- Nicolás Gregorio Nava Rojas (19 Oct 2019 – 18 Apr 2026), appointed Bishop of Cabimas

== See also ==
- Roman Catholicism in Venezuela

== Sources ==
- GCatholic.org
- Catholic Hierarchy
