= Lesvi =

Catholic titular bishopric

Lesvi is a Roman Catholic titular bishopric in the former ecclesiastical province of Mauretania Sitifensis, suffragan of Sitifis, or Sétif, in modern Algeria. It is not, as is sometimes stated, the Island of Lesbos, which never was a titular bishopric, but possesses two titular archbishoprics: Mytilene and Methymna.

The "Itinerarium Antonini" describes Lesvi as situated twenty-five miles from Tupusuctu or Tiklat and eighteen miles from Horrea Aninici (now Ain-Roua, south of Béjaïa). The town was therefore located on the Bou Sellam River. However, there are no archaeological remains.

== Bishops ==
Two bishops of the ancient diocese of Lesvi are recorded:

- Romanus, a Donatist, present at the convention of Carthage, 411
- Vadius, a Catholic exiled by the Vandal King Huneric in 484

The diocese was nominally restored as a Catholic titular bishopric, which has been held by the following bishops:

- Auguste-Jean-Gabriel Maurice (1 Aug 1908 – 27 Jul 1925)
- Denis O’Donaghue (26 Jul 1924 – 7 Nov 1925)
- Simone Chu Kai-min (2 Aug 1926 – 11 Apr 1946)
- Timothy Finbar Manning (3 Aug 1946 – 16 Oct 1967)
- José Tomás Sánchez (5 Feb 1968 – 13 Dec 1971)
- Leopoldo Sumaylo Tumulak (12 Jan 1987 – 28 Nov 1992)
- Juan María Leonardi Villasmil (27 Jan 1994 – 12 Jul 1997)
- Antoni Dziemianko (4 Jul 1998 – 3 May 2012)
- Bohdan Manyshyn (2014.04.02 – )

== Sources ==
- Catholic hierarchy
