= Diocese of Barinas =

Latin Catholic diocese in Venezuela

Coordinates: 8.6317°N 70.2098°W

Diocese of Barinas Dioecesis Barinensis Diócesis de Barinas

Catholic
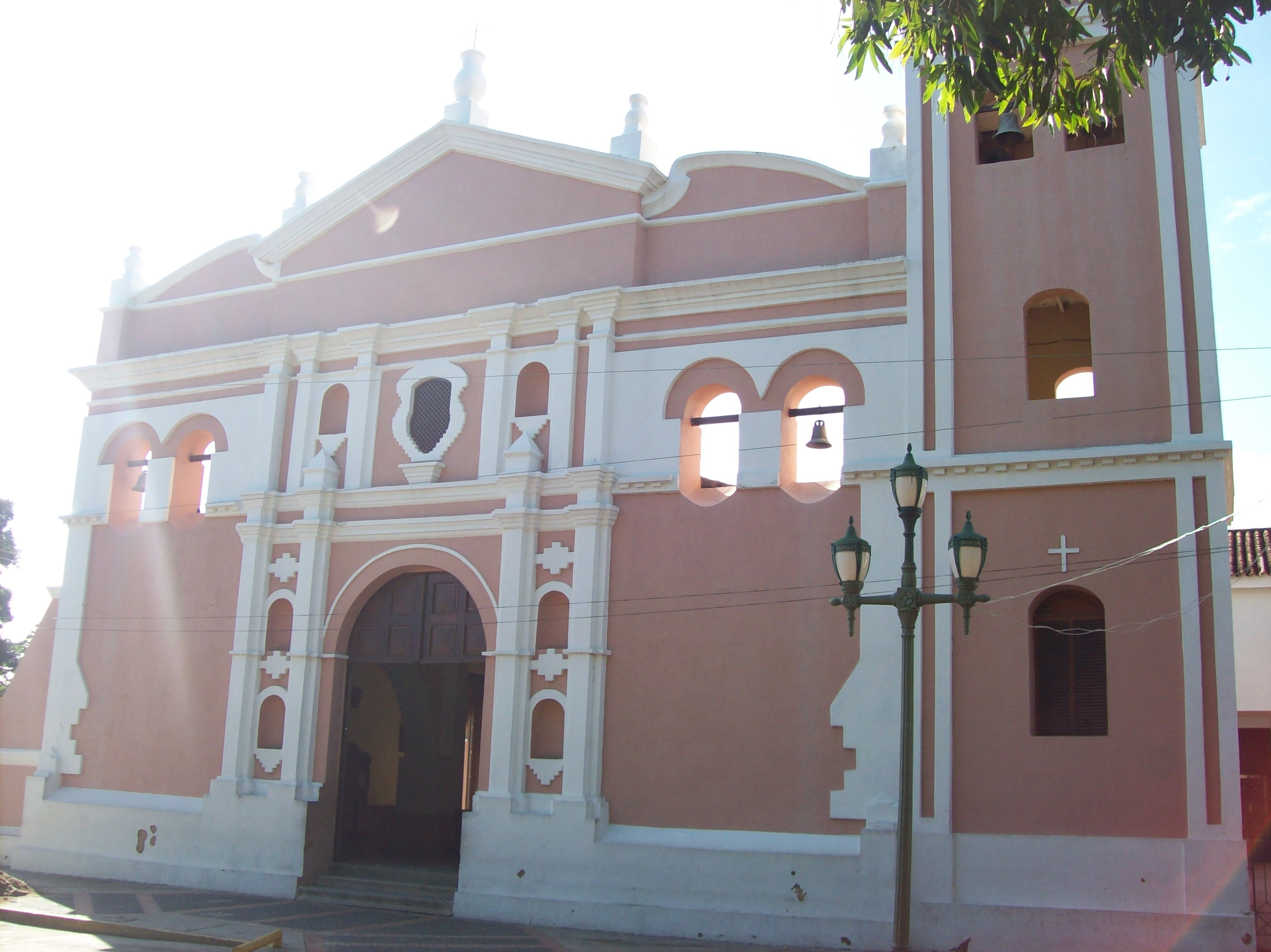
- Cathedral of Our Lady of the Pillar

Location
- Country: Venezuela
- Ecclesiastical province: Mérida
- Headquarters: Barinas, Barinas, Venezuela

Statistics
- Area: 35,200 km^{2} (13,600 sq mi)
- Population: Total; Catholics: (as of 2023); 987,000; 792,000 (80.2%)
- Parishes: 45

Information
- Denomination: Catholic Church
- Sui iuris church: Latin Church
- Rite: Roman Rite
- Established: 23 July 1965; 61 years ago
- Cathedral: Cathedral of Our Lady of the Pillar, Barinas

Current leadership
- Pope: Leo XIV
- Bishop: Juan de Dios Peña Rojas
- Metropolitan Archbishop: Helizandro Terán Bermúdez, O.S.A.
- Bishops emeritus: Ramón Antonio Linares Sandoval; Jesús Alfonso Guerrero Contreras, OFMCap

The Diocese of Barinas (Latin: Dioecesis Barinensis) is a Latin Church diocese of the Catholic Church. It is a suffragan diocese in the ecclesiastical province of Mérida, in western Venezuela's land-locked Barinas state.

Its cathedral is the Catedral de Nuestra Señora del Pilar, dedicated to Our Lady of the Pillar, located in the eponymous state capital Barinas.

== History ==
- On 23 July 1965 Pope Paul VI established the Diocese of Barinas on territories split off from the Diocese of Calabozo and from their Metropolitan, Mérida in Venezuela.
- It lost territory on 3 December 2015 to establish (part of) the Roman Catholic Diocese of Guasdualito, in the same province.

== Bishops ==
=== Episcopal ordinaries ===
Suffragan Bishops of Barinas

- Rafael Ángel González Ramírez (23 July 1965 – 1 August 1992), retired
- Antonio José López Castillo (1 August 1992 – 27 December 2001), appointed Archbishop of Calabozo
- Ramón Antonio Linares Sandoval (16 July 2002 – 30 August 2013), retired
- José Luis Azuaje Ayala (30 August 2013 – 24 May 2018), appointed Archbishop of Maracaibo
- Jesús Alfonso Guerrero Contreras, O.F.M. Cap. (21 December 2018 – 29 July 2026), retired
- Juan de Dios Peña Rojas (29 July 2026 – Present)

=== Auxiliary bishops ===
- José Vicente Henriquez Andueza, S.D.B. (1980-1985), appointed Auxiliary Bishop of Caracas, Santiago de Venezuela
- Alejandro Figueroa Medina (1986-1995), appointed Bishop of Guanare

=== Other priest of this diocese who became bishop ===
- Polito Rodríguez Méndez (1999-2016), appointed Bishop of San Carlos de Venezuela in 2016

== See also ==
- Catholic Church in Venezuela

== Sources and external links ==
- GCatholic.org, with incumbent biography links
- Catholic Hierarchy
