= Diocese of Cabimas =

Latin Catholic diocese in Venezuela

Coordinates: 10.3902°N 71.4679°W

Diocese of Cabimas Dioecesis Cabimensis

Catholic
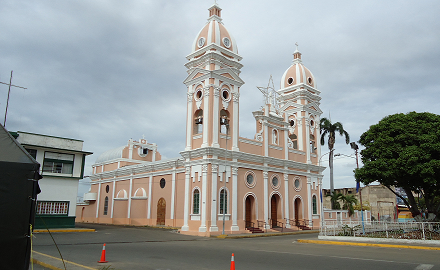
- Cathedral of Our Lady of the Rosary

Location
- Country: Venezuela
- Ecclesiastical province: Maracaibo

Statistics
- Area: 9,342 km^{2} (3,607 sq mi)
- Population: Total; Catholics: (as of 2004); 797,560; 739,380 (92.7%)

Information
- Denomination: Catholic Church
- Sui iuris church: Latin Church
- Rite: Roman Rite
- Established: 23 July 1965 (61 years ago)
- Cathedral: Our Lady of the Rosary Cathedral

Current leadership
- Pope: Leo XIV
- Bishop: Ángel Francisco Caraballo Fermín
- Bishops emeritus: William Enrique Delgado Silva

Map

The Diocese of Cabimas (Latin: Dioecesis Cabimensis) is a Latin Church diocese of the Catholic Church located in the city of Cabimas in the ecclesiastical province of Maracaibo in Venezuela.

== History ==
On 23 July 1965, Pope Paul VI established the Diocese of Cabimas from the Archdiocese of Maracaibo.

== Bishops ==
=== Ordinaries ===
- Constantino Maradei Donato † (23 July 1965 – 18 November 1969) Appointed, Bishop of Barcelona
- Marco Tulio Ramírez Roa † (31 March 1970 – 26 October 1984) Appointed, Bishop of San Cristóbal de Venezuela
- Roberto Lückert León † (27 April 1985 – 21 July 1993) Appointed, Bishop of Coro
- Freddy Jesús Fuenmayor Suárez (12 March 1994 – 30 December 2004) Appointed, Bishop of Los Teques
- William Enrique Delgado Silva (26 July 2005 – 14 September 2018)
- Ángel Francisco Caraballo Fermín (29 January 2019 – present)

=== Another priest of this diocese who became bishop ===
- Nicolás Gregorio Nava Rojas, appointed Bishop of Machiques in 2019

== See also ==
- Catholic Church in Venezuela
