= Helímenas de Jesús Rojo Paredes =

Venezuelan priest (1926–2021)

Helímenas de Jesús Rojo Paredes CIM
- Archbishop of Calabozo
- Church: Catholic Church
- Archdiocese: Archdiocese of Calabozo
- In office: 24 March 1980 – 27 December 2001
- Predecessor: Miguel Antonio Salas Salas
- Successor: Antonio José López Castillo

Orders
- Ordination: 8 July 1950
- Consecration: 18 May 1980 by Miguel Antonio Salas Salas

Personal details
- Born: 22 April 1926 Calderas, Bolívar Municipality, Zamora, United States of Venezuela
- Died: 9 April 2021 (aged 94) Calabozo, Guárico, Venezuela

Helímenas de Jesús Rojo Paredes (22 April 1926 – 9 April 2021) was a Venezuelan Roman Catholic archbishop.

== Career ==
Rojo Paredes was born in Venezuela and was ordained to the priesthood in 1950. He served as bishop and archbishop of the Roman Catholic Archdiocese of Calabozo, Venezuela, from 1980 to 2001.

Paredes died from COVID-19 in 2021.
