= Basilica of St. Lucia, Timotes =

Basilica of St. Lucia
- Basílica de Santa Lucía
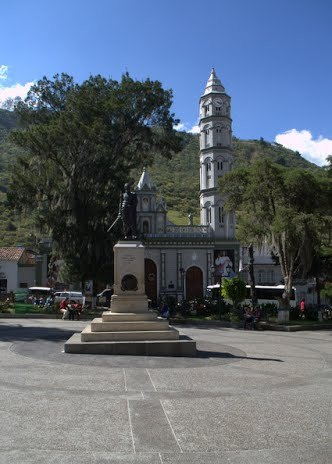
- Basilica of St. Lucia
- Location: Timotes
- Country: Venezuela
- Denomination: Roman Catholic Church

The Basilica of St. Lucia (Spanish: Basílica de Santa Lucía) Also Basilica of Timotes Or alternatively Santa Lucia minor Basilica is a religious building affiliated with the Catholic Church that is located in the town of Timotes in the Miranda Municipality in Merida State, in the Andes of the South American country of Venezuela. It depends on the Archdiocese of Merida (Archidiocese Emeritensis in Venetiola). It has the status of both the National Sanctuary and the Basilica.

This is one of the two basilicas in Merida being the other Cathedral Basilica of the Immaculate Conception in the state capital. He received the distinction of the minor Basilica under the pontificate of Pope John Paul II in 2002. Decree that was executed the following year by Monsignor Baltazar Porras.

It emphasizes among other things the major altar, that culminated in 1915 and was inaugurated in 1916.

== See also ==
- Roman Catholicism in Venezuela
- Basilica of the National Shrine of Our Lady of Coromoto
