= Archdiocese of Mérida in Venezuela =

Roman Catholic archdiocese in Venezuela

Coordinates: 8°35′50″N 71°08′38″W

Archdiocese of Mérida Archidioecesis Emeritensis in Venetiola

Catholic
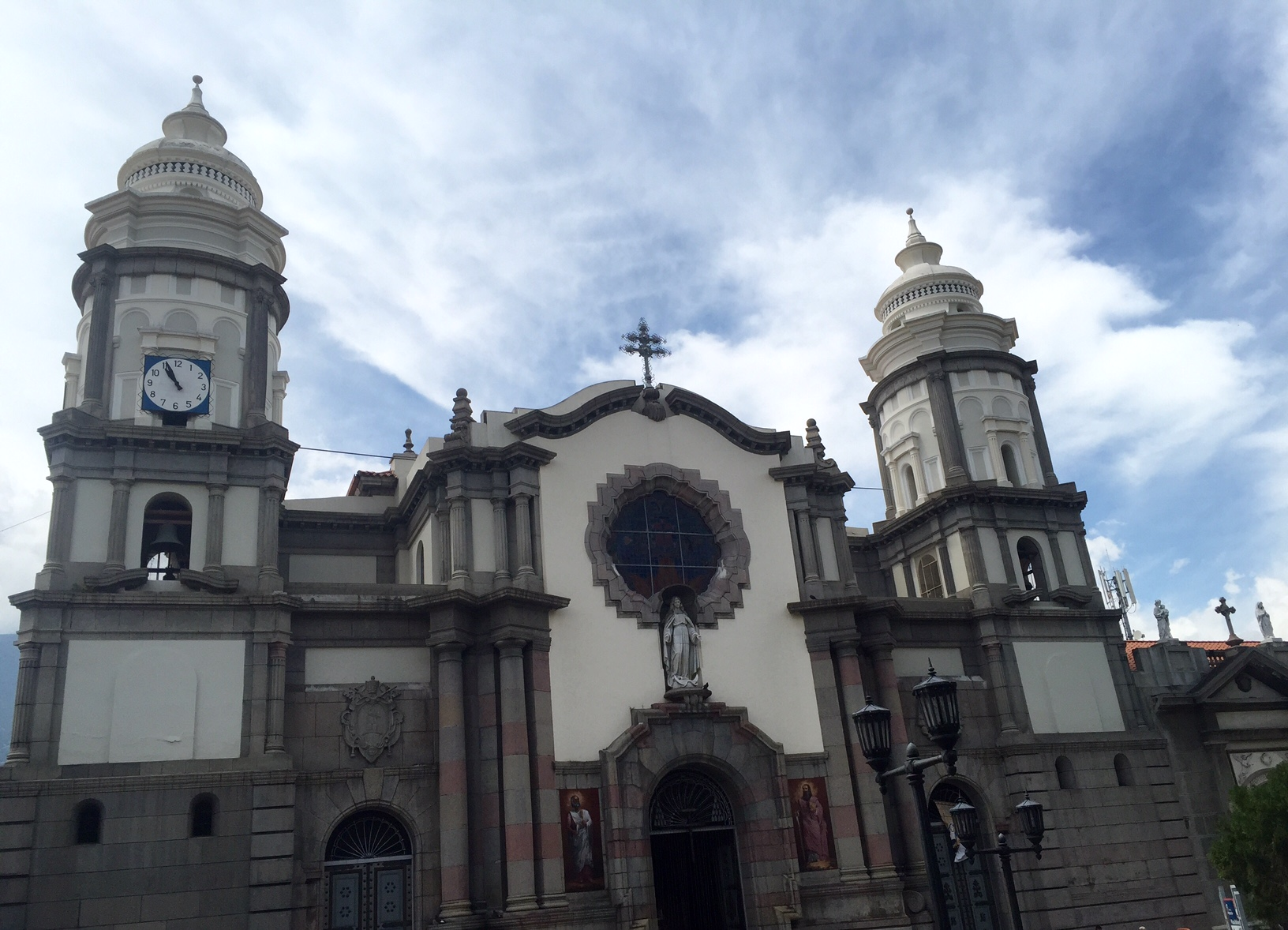
- Cathedral Basilica of the Immaculate Conception

- Coat of arms

Location
- Country: Venezuela

Statistics
- Area: 8,109 km^{2} (3,131 sq mi)
- Population: Total; Catholics: (as of 2004); 603,464; 543,118 (90.0%)

Information
- Rite: Latin Rite
- Established: 16 February 1778 (248 years ago)
- Cathedral: Catedral Basílica Menor de la Inmaculada Concepción de Mérida

Current leadership
- Pope: Leo XIV
- Metropolitan Archbishop: Helizandro Terán Bermúdez
- Auxiliary Bishops: Luis Enrique Rojas Ruiz
- Bishops emeritus: Luis Alfonso Márquez Molina, C.I.M.

Map

The Roman Catholic Archdiocese of Mérida (Latin: Archidioecesis Emeritensis in Venetiola) is a Latin Rite Metropolitan Archdiocese in western Venezuela.

Its cathedral archiepiscopal see is Catedral Basílica Menor de la Inmaculada Concepción de Mérida, a minor basilica located in the city of Mérida. It also has the Minor Basilica of Santa Lucía, in Timotes town, Miranda, Mérida municipality.

== History ==
- On 16 February 1778 Pope Pius VI established the Diocese of Mérida, on territories split off from the then Diocese of Caracas and Metropolitan Archdiocese of Santafé en Nueva Granada in Colombia.
- It lost territory repeatedly : on 1863.03.07 to establish the Dioceses of Barquisimeto (now a Metropolitan) and Calabozo; on 1897.07.28 to establish Diocese of Zulia; on 1922.10.12 to establish its suffragan Diocese of San Cristóbal de Venezuela
- Pope Pius IX elevated the diocese to Metropolitan Archdiocese of Mérida on 11 June 1923.
- It lost more territory to establish two more suffragans : on 1957.06.04 Trujillo, on 1965.07.23 Barinas
- It enjoyed a Papal visit from Pope John Paul II in January 1985.
- On 1994.07.07 it lost territory to establish the Diocese of El Vigía–San Carlos del Zulia
- On 3 December 2015 it was assigned another suffragan see, the newly created Diocese of Guasdualito

== Statistics ==
As per 2014, it pastorally served 566,519 Catholics (85.0% of 666,491 total) on 8,109 km^{2} in 62 parishes and 14 missions with 133 priests (98 diocesan, 35 religious), 21 deacons, 277 lay religious (59 brothers, 218 sisters) and 46 seminarians.

== Leadership ==
=== Bishops of Merida ===
- Juan Ramos de Lora, O.F.M. (1782–1790)
- Cándido Manuel de Torrijos y Riguerra, O.P. (1791–1794)
- Antonio Ramón de Espinosa y Lorenzo, O.P. (1795–1800)
- Santiago Hernández y Milanés (1801–1812)
- Rafael Lasso y de la Vega (1816–1828), appointed Bishop of Quito
- José Buenaventura Arias y Bergara (1828–1831)
- José Vicente de Unda (1836–1840)
- Juan Hilario Bosset y del Castillo (1842–1873)
- Thomas Zerpa (1876), did not take effect
- Román Lovera (1880–1892)
- Antonio Ramón Silva (1894–1923)

=== Archbishops of Mérida ===
- Antonio Ramón Silva (1923–1927)
- Acacio Chacón Guerra (1927–1966)
- José Rafael Pulido Méndez (1966–1972)
- Angel Pérez Cisneros (1972–1979)
- Miguel Antonio Salas Salas, C.I.M. (1979–1991)
- Baltazar Enrique Porras Cardozo (1991–2023) (elevated to cardinal in 2016)
- Helizandro Terán Bermúdez (2023–present)

=== Coadjutor Archbishops ===
- Acacio Chacón Guerra (1926–1927)
- José Humberto Quintero Parra (1953–1960), did not succeed to see; appointed Archbishop of Caracas, Santiago de Venezuela (cardinal in 1961)
- José Rafael Pulido Méndez (1961–1966)
- Angel Pérez Cisneros (1969–1972)
- Helizandro Terán Bermúdez (2022–2023)

=== Auxiliary Bishops ===
- José Buenaventura Arias y Bergara (1827–1829)
- Baltazar Enrique Porras Cardozo (1983 - 1991) appointed Archbishop of Mérida
- Juan María Leonardi Villasmil (1994–1997), appointed Bishop of Punto Fijo
- Luis Alfonso Márquez Molina, C.I.M. (2001–2013)
- Alfredo Enrique Torres Rondón (2013–2016), appointed Bishop of San Fernando de Apure
- Luis Enrique Rojas Ruiz (2017–2023), appointed Bishop of Punto Fijo

=== Other priests of this diocese who became bishops ===
- Juan de Dios Peña Rojas, appointed Bishop of El Vigia-San Carlos del Zulia in 2015

== Ecclesiastical province ==
The Metropolitan's ecclesiastical province comprises his own archbishopric and the following Suffragan sees :

- Roman Catholic Diocese of Barinas, its daughter
- Roman Catholic Diocese of Guasdualito
- Roman Catholic Diocese of San Cristóbal de Venezuela, its daughter
- Roman Catholic Diocese of Trujillo, Venezuela

== See also ==
- List of Catholic dioceses in Venezuela
- Roman Catholicism in Venezuela

== Sources and external links ==
- GCatholic.org - data for all sections
- Diocese website
- Catholic Hierarchy ^{[self-published]}
