= Antonio José López Castillo =

Venezuelan priest (1945–2021)

- Archbishop of Barquisimeto
- Church: Catholic Church
- Archdiocese: Archdiocese of Barquisimeto
- In office: 22 December 2007 – 25 March 2020
- Predecessor: Tulio Manuel Chirivella Varela
- Successor: Polito Rodríguez Méndez
- Previous posts: Archbishop of Calabozo (2001-2007); Bishop of Barinas (1992-2001); Titular Bishop of Theuzi (1988-1992); Auxiliary Bishop of Maracaibo (1988-1992)

Orders
- Ordination: 18 July 1970
- Consecration: 28 May 1988 by Domingo Roa Pérez

Personal details
- Born: 9 July 1945 Maracaibo, Zulia, United States of Venezuela
- Died: 18 July 2021 (aged 76) Maracaibo, Zulia, Venezuela

Antonio José López Castillo (9 July 1945 – 18 July 2021) was a Venezuelan Roman Catholic priest and prelate. He served as auxiliary bishop of the Roman Catholic Diocese of Maracaibo from 1988 to 1992 and the Bishop of the Roman Catholic Diocese of Barinas from 1992 to 2001. He then served as the Archbishop of the Roman Catholic Archdiocese of Calabozo from 2001 to 2007 and the Archbishop of the Roman Catholic Archdiocese of Barquisimeto from 2007 until his retirement in March 2020.

Archbishop Emeritus Antonio José López Castillo died from a stroke in Maracaibo on 18 July 2021, at the age of 76.
