= Ramón José Viloria Pinzón =

Venezuelan priest (1959–2022)

Ramón José Viloria Pinzón (6 April 1959 – 23 February 2022) was a Venezuelan Roman Catholic prelate.

Viloria Pinzón was born in Venezuela and was ordained to the priesthood in 1990. He served as bishop of the Roman Catholic Diocese of Puerto Cabello, Venezuela, from 2004 until his resignation in 2010. He died on 23 February 2022, at the age of 62.
