= Diocese of San Fernando de Apure =

Roman Catholic diocese in Venezuela

Diocese of San Fernando de Apure Dioecesis Sancti Ferdinandi Apurensis

Catholic
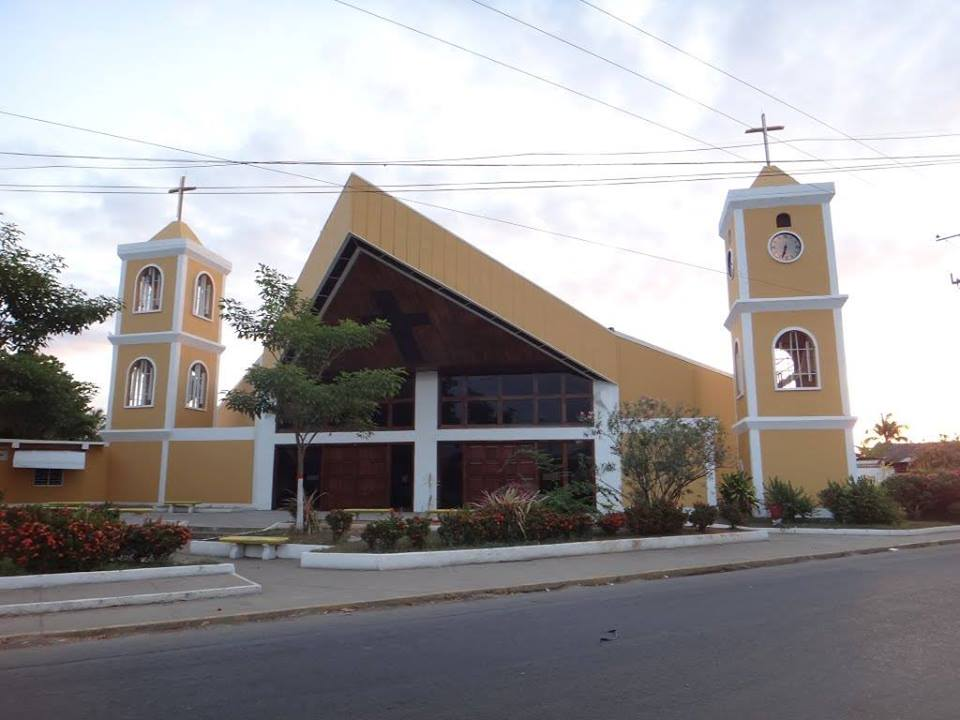
- Catedral Nuestra Señora del Carmen in Guasdualito

Location
- Country: Venezuela
- Ecclesiastical province: Calabozo

Statistics
- Area: 76,500 km^{2} (29,500 sq mi)
- Population: Total; Catholics: (as of 2004); 415,000; 352,750 (85.0%)

Information
- Denomination: Catholic Church
- Rite: Latin Rite
- Established: 7 June 1954 (72 years ago)
- Cathedral: Catedral Nuestra Señora del Carmen

Current leadership
- Pope: Leo XIV
- Bishop: Elieser Antonio Rivero Barrios
- Bishops emeritus: Alfredo Enrique Torres Rondón

Map

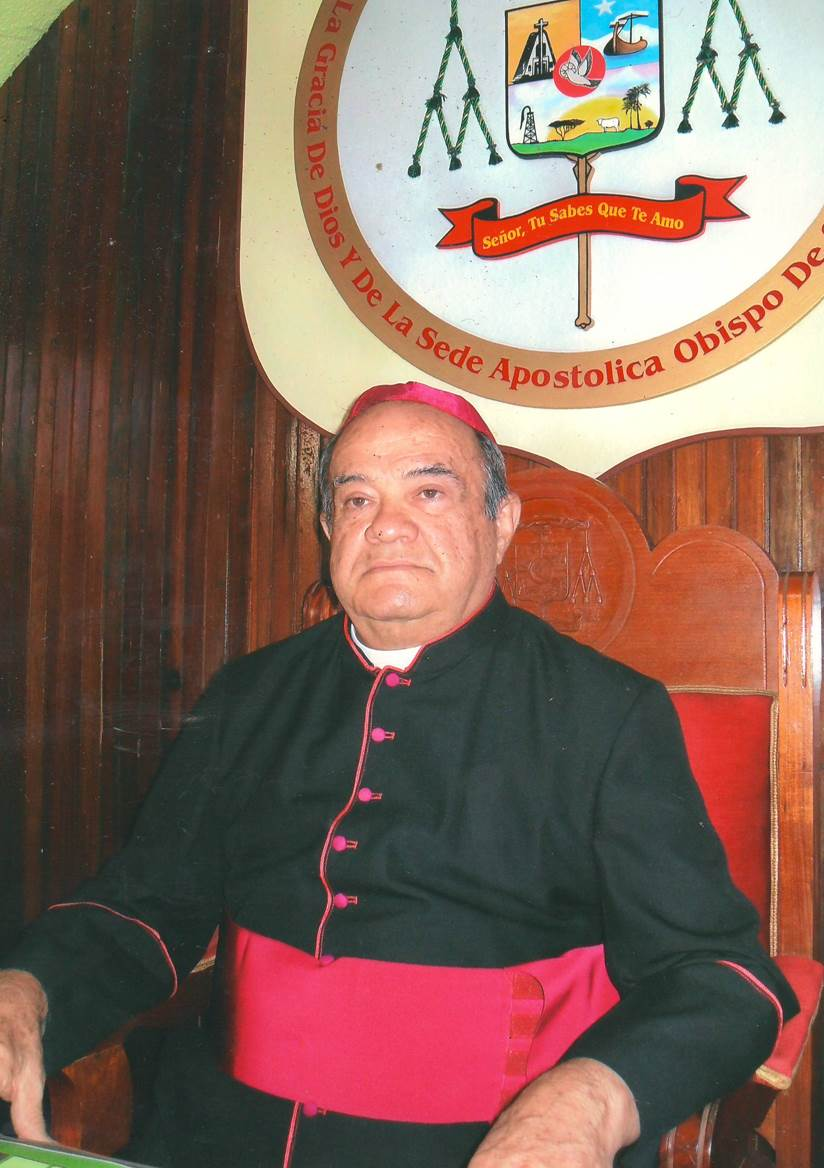
Víctor Manuel Pérez Rojas, Bishop of this diocese 2001-2016

The Roman Catholic Diocese of San Fernando de Apure (Latin: Dioecesis Sancti Ferdinandi Apurensis) is a suffragan Latin diocese in the ecclesiastical province of Calabozo in Venezuela.

Its cathedral episcopal see is located in the city of San Fernando de Apure.

== History ==
It was established on 7 June 1954 as Territorial Prelature of San Fernando de Apure, of territories split off from the Dioceses of Calabozo and San Cristóbal de Venezuela. It was promoted on 12 November 1974 as the Diocese of San Fernando de Apure. It lost territory on 3 December 2015 to establish (part of) the Diocese of Guasdualito.

== Episcopal ordinaries ==
Territorial Prelates of San Fernando de Apure

- Bishop-prelate Angel Adolfo Polachini Rodriguez (30 November 1966 – 25 March 1971); Titular Bishop of Rusticiana; later Bishop of Guanare (Venezuela) (25 March 1971 – retired 16 April 1994).
- Bishop-prelate Roberto Antonio Dávila Uzcátegui (23 June 1972 – 12 November 1974 see below); Titular Bishop of Aurusuliana.

Suffragan Bishops of San Fernando de Apure

- Roberto Antonio Dávila Uzcátegui (see above 12 November 1974 – 23 June 1992; later Auxiliary Bishop of Caracas (Venezuela); Titular Bishop of Arindela.
- Apostolic Administrator (27 May 1992 – 12 July 1994) Ignacio Antonio Velasco García, S.D.B. while Titular Bishop of Utimmira and Apostolic Vicar of Puerto Ayacucho (Venezuela) (both 23 October 1989 - 27 May 1995); later Metropolitan Archbishop of Caracas and Cardinal-Priest of S. Maria Domenica Mazzarello
- Mariano José Parra Sandoval (12 July 1994 - 10 July 2001); later Bishop of Ciudad Guayana (Venezuela) and Archbishop of Coro
- Víctor Manuel Pérez Rojas (7 November 2001 - 15 July 2016 retired); previously Titular Bishop of Tagaria and Auxiliary Bishop of Calabozo
- Alfredo Enrique Torres Rondón (15 July 2016 - 21 November 2025); previously Titular Bishop of Sassura (2013.07.15 - 2016.07.15) & Auxiliary Bishop of Mérida (Venezuela) (2013.07.15 - 2016.07.15)
- Elieser Antonio Rivero Barrios, appointed on 21 November 2026

== See also ==
- Roman Catholicism in Venezuela
