= Miguel Saturnino Aurrecoechea Palacios =

Spanish clergyman and auxiliary bishop

Miguel Saturnino Aurrecoechea Palacios O.F.M.Cap.
- Vicar Apostolic of Machiques
- Church: Catholic Church
- See: Apostolic Vicariate of Machiques
- In office: 19 December 1955 – 10 March 1986
- Predecessor: Ángel Turrado Moreno
- Successor: Agustín Romualdo Álvarez Rodríguez
- Other post: Titular Bishop of Doliche (1955-1997)

Orders
- Ordination: 6 June 1936
- Consecration: 27 May 1956 by Raffaele Forni

Personal details
- Born: 1 January 1904 Villaverde de Trucíos, Cantabria, Kingdom of Spain
- Died: 8 September 1997 (aged 93)

Miguel Saturnino Aurrecoechea Palacios (1 January 1904, in Villaverde – 8 September 1997) was a Spanish clergyman and auxiliary bishop for the Roman Catholic Diocese of Machiques, and earlier for the titular see of Doliche. He was ordained in 1936. He was appointed bishop in 1955. He died in 1997.
