= Diocese of Puerto Cabello =

Roman Catholic diocese in Venezuela

Diocese of Puerto Cabello Dioecesis Portus Cabellensis

Catholic

Location
- Country: Venezuela
- Metropolitan: Valencia en Venezuela

Statistics
- Area: 729 km^{2} (281 sq mi)
- Population: Total; Catholics: (as of 2004); 300,000; 270,000 (90.0%)

Information
- Rite: Latin Rite
- Established: 5 July 1994 (32 years ago)
- Cathedral: Catedral San José

Current leadership
- Pope: Leo XIV
- Bishop: Saúl Figueroa Albornoz
- Bishops emeritus: Ramón José Viloria Pinzón, S.O.D.

Map

The Roman Catholic Diocese of Puerto Cabello (Latin: Dioecesis Portus Cabellensis) is a diocese located in the city of Puerto Cabello in the ecclesiastical province of Valencia en Venezuela in Venezuela.

== History ==
On 5 July 1994, John Paul II established the Diocese of Puerto Cabello from Metropolitan Archdiocese of Valencia.

== Ordinaries ==
- Ramón Antonio Linares Sandoval (1994.07.05 – 2002.07.16)
- Ramón José Viloria Pinzón, S.O.D. (2003.12.05 – 2010.03.13)
- Saúl Figueroa Albornoz (2011.04.30 – present)

== See also ==
- Roman Catholicism in Venezuela

== Sources ==
- GCatholic.org
- Catholic Hierarchy ^{[self-published]}
