= Military Ordinariate of Venezuela =

Latin Catholic ecclesiastical jurisdiction in Venezuela

Military Ordinariate of Venezuela Ordinariatus Militaris Venetiola Ordinariato Militar de Venezuela

Location
- Country: Venezuela
- Ecclesiastical province: Immediately exempt to the Holy See

Information
- Denomination: Catholic Church
- Sui iuris church: Latin Church
- Rite: Roman Rite
- Established: 31 October 1995 (29 years ago)

Current leadership
- Pope: Francis
- Bishop: Benito Adán Méndez Bracamonte

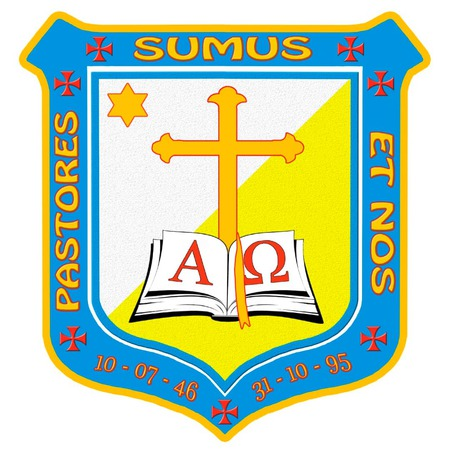

The Military Ordinariate of Venezuela (Spanish: Ordinariato Militar de Venezuela) is a Latin Church military ordinariate of the Catholic Church. Immediately exempt to the Holy See, it provides pastoral care to Catholics serving in the Venezuelan Armed Forces and their families.

== History ==
The military ordinary was established by Pope John Paul II on 31 October 1995.

== Military ordinaries ==
- Marcial Augusto Ramírez Ponce (appointed 11 February 1996 – retired 19 December 2000)
- José Hernán Sánchez Porras (19 December 2000 – 13 October 2014)
- Benito Adán Méndez Bracamonte (8 June 2015 – present)

== See also ==
- Roman Catholicism in Venezuela
