= Archdiocese of Maracaibo =

Roman Catholic archdiocese in Venezuela

Coordinates: 10.6416°N 71.6069°W

Archdiocese of Maracaibo Archidioecesis Maracaibensis

Catholic
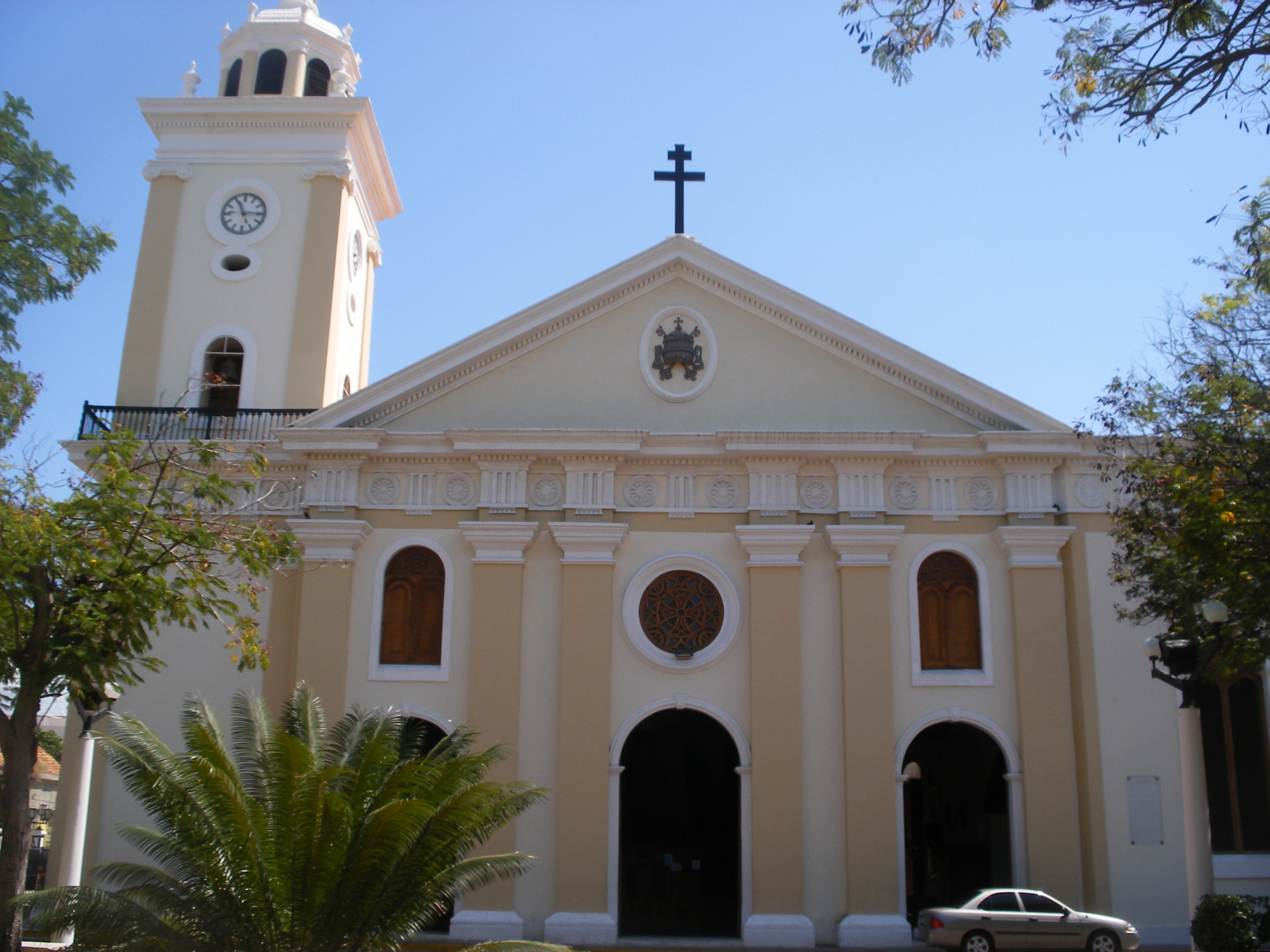
- Maracaibo Cathedral; Catedral de San Pedro y San Pablo

Location
- Country: Venezuela
- Ecclesiastical province: Maracaibo

Statistics
- Area: 10,761 km^{2} (4,155 sq mi)
- Population: Total; Catholics: (as of 2004); 2,006,757; 1,863,690 (92.9%)
- Parishes: 65

Information
- Denomination: Catholic
- Sui iuris church: Latin Church
- Rite: Roman Rite
- Established: 28 July 1897 (129 years ago)
- Cathedral: St. Peter and St. Paul Cathedral

Current leadership
- Pope: Leo XIV
- Archbishop: José Luis Azuaje Ayala
- Auxiliary Bishops: Ángel Francisco Caraballo Fermín
- Bishops emeritus: Ubaldo Ramón Santana Sequera, FMI

Map

The Archdiocese of Maracaibo (Latin: Archidioecesis Maracaibensis) is an archdiocese in Venezuela. Since November 2000, its Archbishop has been Ubaldo Ramón Santana Sequera. The city of Maracaibo, the second largest in Venezuela, has a population of approximately 2,800,000. The Archdiocese covers a total area of 10,761 square kilometers (4,156 square miles) in Zulia State.

== History ==
The archdiocese was first established as the Diocese of Mérida by Pope Leo XIII on 28 July 1897 as part of the Archdiocese of Caracas. It was renamed the Diocese of Zulia (2 January 1953) and renamed again as the Diocese of Maracaibo (23 July 1965). Finally it was elevated to Archdiocese on 30 April 1966.

Maracaibo was visited by Pope John Paul II in 1985.

== Bishops ==
=== Ordinaries ===
- Francisco Marvéz (25 Oct 1897 – 17 Dec 1904)
- Arturo Celestino Álvarez (16 Aug 1910 – 18 Dec 1919) Appointed, Coadjutor Bishop of Calabozo
- Marcos Sergio Godoy (8 Mar 1920 – 21 Oct 1957)
- José Rafael Pulido Méndez (21 Jun 1958 – 16 Jan 1961) Appointed, Coadjutor Archbishop of Mérida
- Domingo Roa Pérez (16 Jan 1961 – 23 Dec 1992)
- Ramón Ovidio Pérez Morales (23 Dec 1992 – 5 Jun 1999) Appointed, Archbishop (Personal Title) of Los Teques
- Ubaldo Ramón Santana Sequera, FMI (11 Nov 2000 – 24 May 2018)
- José Luis Azuaje Ayala (24 May 2018 – present)

=== Auxiliary bishops ===
- José Rincón Bonilla † (1950-1961), appointed Auxiliary Bishop of Caracas, Santiago de Venezuela
- José Alí Lebrún Moratinos † (1956-1958), appointed Bishop of Maracay; future Cardinal
- Antonio José López Castillo (1988-1992), appointed Bishop of Barinas
- William Enrique Delgado Silva (1995-1999), appointed Bishop of El Vigia-San Carlos del Zulia
- Cástor Oswaldo Azuaje Pérez, OCD (2007-2012), appointed Bishop of Trujillo
- Ángel Francisco Caraballo Fermín (2012-2019), appointed Bishop of Cabimas

=== Other priests of this diocese who became bishops ===
- Felipe Rincón González †, appointed Archbishop of Caracas, Santiago de Venezuela in 1916
- Roberto Lückert León, appointed Bishop of Cabimas in 1985
- Enrique Pérez Lavado, appointed Bishop of Maturín in 2003
- Edgar Peña Parra, appointed nuncio and titular Archbishop in 2011

== Our Lady of Rosario of Chiquinquirá ==
This basilica in Maracaibo is one of the many popular representations of the Virgin Mary in Venezuela. The story of an apparition of the virgin dates from the 18th century.

An old lady made her living by washing other people's clothes, a job she did every morning on the shores of the lake. On 18 November 1709 she had collected a load of clothes, and as usual, headed to the lake to wash them. This old lady was at her chores when she saw a wooden board floating towards her, and picked it up thinking that it might be of some use. When she had finished her work, she went home carrying the clothes, the board and a small vase of fresh water. Having placed the board on top of the vase, she noticed a small figure in the board but could not tell what it was.

She fell asleep, and when she awoke it was already late and dark. She decided to go to a local grocery store (in 1709?!) to buy some candles. On her way back a small group of people had gathered outside her house, and coming closer she noticed that her home was filled with light. After entering she and some of the neighbours witnessed the small wooden board floating in the air surrounded by light with a bright crisp image of the Virgin Mary, an event since popularly held a miracle.

Since that day the street where she lived has been known as El Milagro meaning ¨Miracle¨ in Spanish, and to this day it is one of the most important streets in the neighbourhood of El Saladillo in the city of Maracaibo.

== Suffragan dioceses ==
- Diocese of Cabimas
- Diocese of El Vigia-San Carlos del Zulia
- Diocese of Machiques

== See also ==
- Roman Catholicism in Venezuela
