= Archdiocese of Calabozo =

Roman Catholic archdiocese in Venezuela

Coordinates: 8.9342°N 67.4275°W

Archdiocese of Calabozo Archidioecesis Calabocensis

Catholic
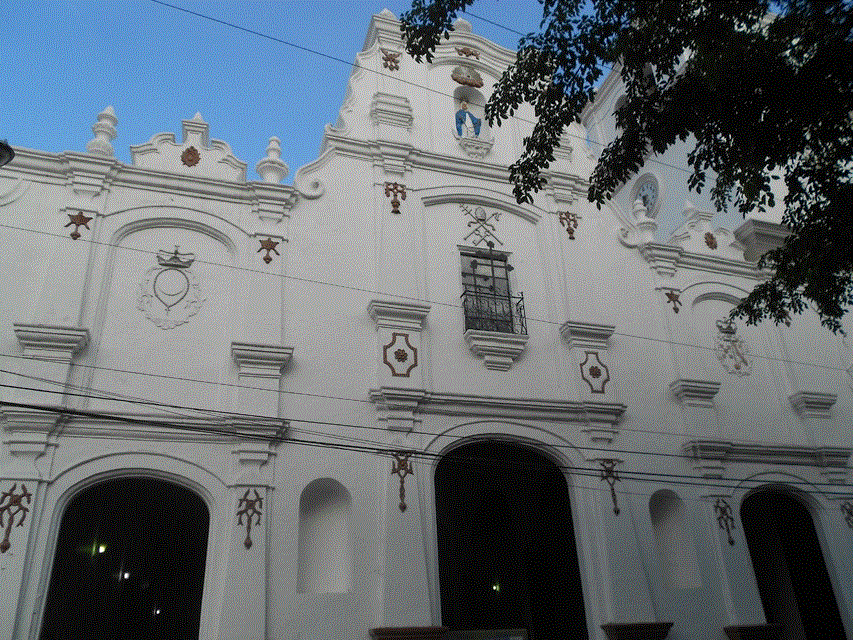
- All Saints Cathedral in Calabozo

Location
- Country: Venezuela
- Ecclesiastical province: Calabozo

Statistics
- Area: 32,000 km^{2} (12,000 sq mi)
- Population: Total; Catholics: (as of 2006); 560,000; 519,000 (92.7%)
- Parishes: 24

Information
- Denomination: Roman Catholic
- Rite: Roman Rite
- Established: 7 March 1863 (163 years ago)
- Cathedral: All Saints Cathedral

Current leadership
- Pope: Leo XIV
- Archbishop: Manuel Felipe Díaz Sánchez

Map

The Roman Catholic Archdiocese of Calabozo (Latin: Archidioecesis Calabocensis) is a Roman Catholic archdiocese in Calabozo, Venezuela. It was a diocese until 1995.

== History ==
The original diocese of Calabozo, embracing the section of Guárico and portions of the sections of Apure, Zamora, Portuguesa, Cojedes and Guzman Blanco, was created 7 March 1863 by Pius IX as a suffragan of the Archdiocese of Caracas (Santiago de Venezuela), and its first bishop was consecrated 30 October 1881. John Paul II elevated the diocese to an archdiocese on 17 June 1995. As a metropolitan archdiocese, it has 2 suffragans:

- San Fernando de Apure
- Valle de la Pascua

== Bishops ==
=== Ordinaries ===
- Salustiano Crespo † (4 Aug 1881 – 12 Jul 1888)
- Felipe Neri Sendra (Sendrea) † (25 Sep 1891 – 9 May 1921)
- Arturo Celestino Álvarez † (9 May 1921 – 8 Jan 1952)
- Antonio Ignacio Camargo † (8 Jan 1952 – 2 Sep 1957) Appointed, Bishop of Trujillo
- Domingo Roa Pérez † (3 Oct 1957 – 16 Jan 1961) Appointed, Bishop of Maracaibo
- Miguel Antonio Salas Salas, C.I.M. † (16 Jan 1961 – 20 Aug 1979) Appointed, Archbishop of Mérida
- Helímenas de Jesús Rojo Paredes, C.I.M. (24 Mar 1980 – 27 Dec 2001)
- Antonio José López Castillo (27 Dec 2001 – 22 Dec 2007) Appointed, Archbishop of Barquisimeto
- Manuel Felipe Díaz Sánchez (10 Dec 2008 – present)

=== Coadjutor bishops ===
- Arturo Celestino Álvarez † (1919-1921)
- Antonio Ignacio Camargo † (1949-1952)

=== Auxiliary bishops ===
- Antonio Ignacio Camargo † (1947-1949), appointed Coadjutor here
- Víctor Manuel Pérez Rojas † (1998-2001), appointed Bishop of San Fernando de Apure

== See also ==
- Roman Catholicism in Venezuela
