= José Hernán Sánchez Porras =

Venezuelan Roman Catholic bishop

- Military Ordinary of Venezuela
- Church: Catholic Church
- In office: 19 December 2000 – 13 October 2014
- Predecessor: Marcial Augusto Ramírez Ponce
- Successor: Benito Adán Méndez Bracamonte

Orders
- Ordination: 25 June 1967
- Consecration: 16 February 2001 by Tulio Manuel Chirivella Varela

Personal details
- Born: 31 March 1944 Palmira, Táchira, United States of Venezuela
- Died: 13 October 2014 (aged 70)
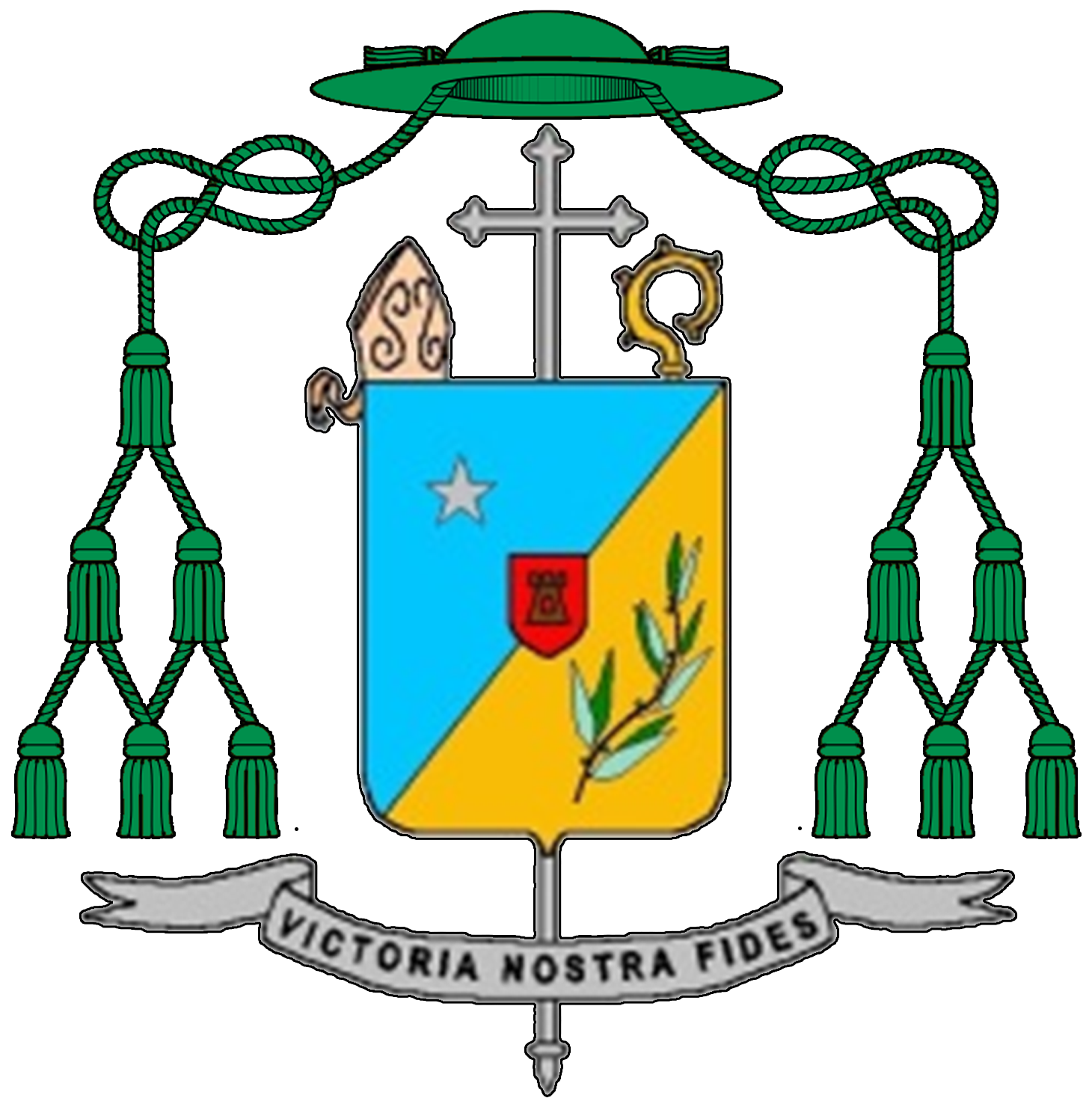
- Coat of arms

José Hernán Sánchez Porras (31 March 1944 – 13 October 2014) was a Roman Catholic bishop.

== Career ==
Ordained to the priesthood on 25 June 1967, Sánchez Porras was named bishop of the Military Ordinariate of Venezuela on 19 December 2000 and was ordained bishop on 16 February 2001.
