= Diocese of Trujillo, Venezuela =

Roman Catholic diocese in Venezuela

Diocese of Trujillo Dioecesis Truxillensis in Venetiola

Catholic

Location
- Country: Venezuela
- Ecclesiastical province: Mérida

Statistics
- Area: 7,400 km^{2} (2,900 sq mi)
- Population: Total; Catholics: (as of 2004); 712,697; 677,062 (95.0%)

Information
- Rite: Latin Rite
- Established: 4 June 1957 (69 years ago)
- Cathedral: Catedral Nuestra Señora de la Paz

Current leadership
- Pope: Leo XIV
- Bishop: José Trinidad Fernández Angulo

Map

The Roman Catholic Diocese of Trujillo (Latin: Dioecesis Truxillensis in Venetiola) is a diocese located in the city of Trujillo in the ecclesiastical province of Mérida in Venezuela.

== History ==
On 4 June 1957 Pope Pius XII established the Diocese of Trujillo from the Metropolitan Archdiocese of Mérida.

The episcopal headquarters is in the city of Trujillo, where the Cathedral of Our Lady of Peace is located.

Its territory is divided into 79 parishes, a Rectory and a Vicariate.

== Bishops ==
=== Ordinaries ===
- Antonio Ignacio Camargo † (2 Sep 1957 – 13 Dec 1961)
- José Léon Rojas Chaparro † (13 Dec 1961 – 11 Jun 1982)
- Vicente Ramón Hernández Peña † (11 Jun 1982 – 3 Apr 2012)
- Cástor Oswaldo Azuaje Pérez, OCD † (3 Apr 2012 – 8 Jan 2021)
- José Trinidad Fernández Angulo (15 Jul 2021 – present)

=== Coadjutors bishops ===
- José Léon Rojas Chaparro † (1961)
- Rosalio José Castillo Lara, SDB † (1973-1975), did not succeed to see; appointed Secretary of the Pontifical Commission for the Revision of the Code of Canon Law
- Vicente Ramón Hernández Peña † (1976-1982)

=== Other priests of this diocese who became bishops ===
- Joaquín José Morón Hidalgo †, appointed Bishop of Valle de la Pascua in 1992
- José de la Trinidad Valera Angulo, appointed Auxiliary Bishop of Caracas, Santiago de Venezuela in 1997
- José Luis Azuaje Ayala, appointed Auxiliary Bishop of Barquisimeto in 1999
- Ramón José Aponte Fernández, appointed Bishop of Valle de la Pascua in 2004
- Benito Adán Méndez Bracamonte, appointed Bishop of Venezuela, Military in 2015
- Carlos Alfredo Cabezas Mendoza, appointed Bishop of Punto Fijo in 2016

== See also ==
- Roman Catholicism in Venezuela
