= Catholic Church sexual abuse cases in Venezuela =

- Part of Catholic Church sexual abuse cases
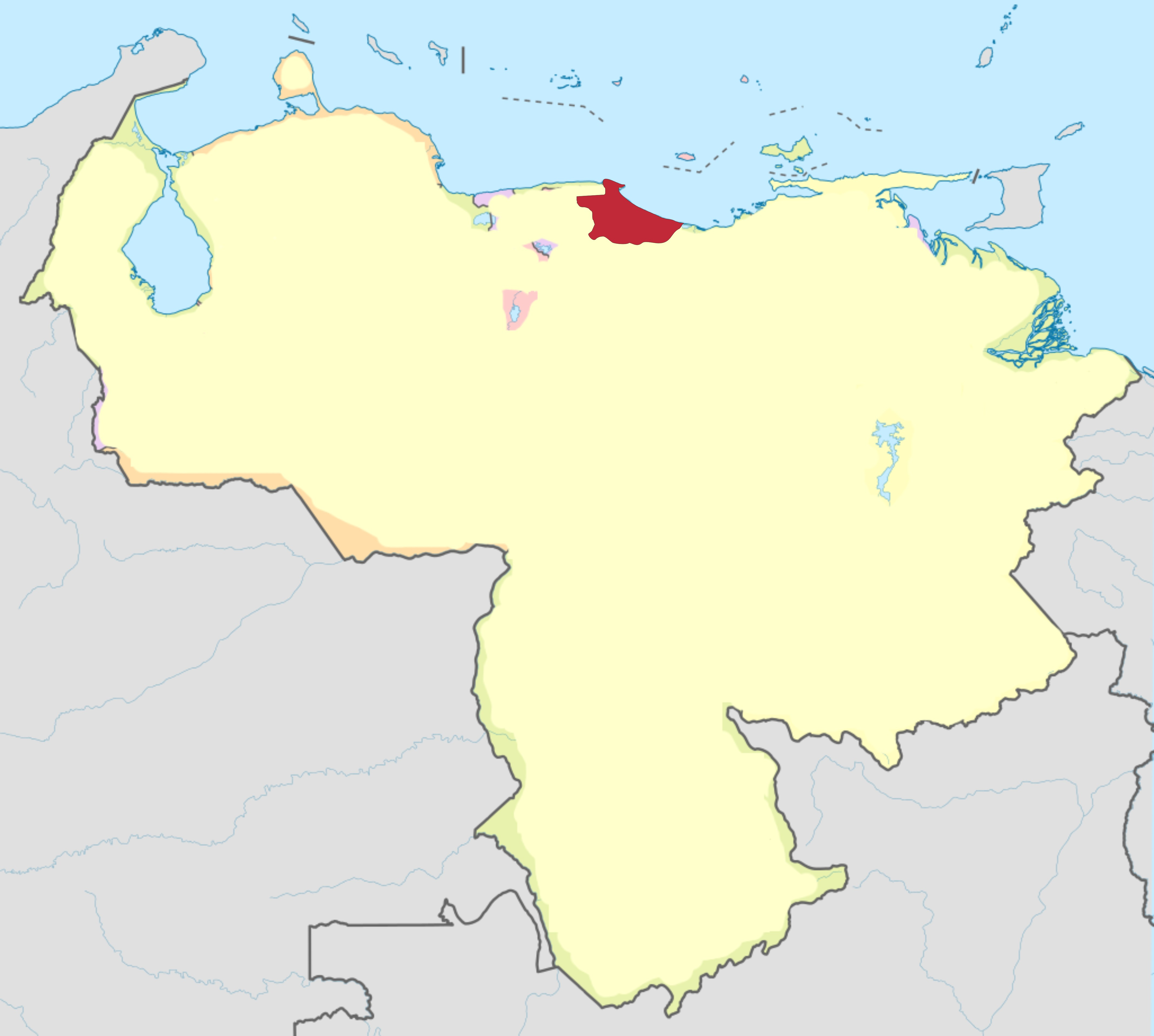
- Map of the Roman Catholic Archdiocese of Caracas in Venezuela
- Date: 2001–2022
- Location: Venezuela
- Cause: Sexual abuse of minors and vulnerable adults by Catholic clergy; institutional failures and improper handling of allegations
- Participants: Clergy of the Catholic Church in Venezuela; victims and survivors; Venezuelan courts and civil authorities; Venezuelan Catholic hierarchy
- Outcome: Public scandals and media reports; church investigations and commitments to policy responses; continued public debate
- Verdict: Mixed (some convictions, limited penalties, and returning to ministry)
- Convictions: Multiple priests convicted or accused (various outcomes reported)

In 2022, a scandal unfolded in Venezuela after the American newspaper The Washington Post published a report detailing an original investigation in Catholic priests in Venezuela who were accused and/or convicted of sexual abuse. The report revealed that of the at least 10 Catholic priests accused and/or convicted of sexual abuse between 2001 and 2022, three served little or no time in sentence and returned to priesthood. The Washington Post mentioned cases that occurred in Anzoátegui, Falcón, Lara, Mérida and Zulia, although there have been complains in at least eleven states in Venezuela.

The Church confirmed the veracity of the report, admitting the existence of cases of abuse that same year, announcing an investigation and actions to prevent sexual abuse in the future. This scandal follows others that occurred in Mexico, Argentina, Chile, Colombia and Peru.

== Cases ==
=== Background ===
According to the International Children's Rights Network, the first case of ecclesiastical sexual abuse brought to court in Venezuela was in 2013, when a priest was legally accused of sexually abusing four girls and women, aged between 14 and 22. In 2013, the same priest was involved in another case of ten orphaned children, who reported he had sexually abused them during their residence in a church-run home for children with HIV. In 2018, the priest was arrested for having sexually abused a girl for three years.

The Spanish newspaper El País published a report in March 2022 about sexual abuse case from the 1960s, which a priest at the Salesiano San Francisco de Sales school abusing an infant in the school's care. The newspaper contacted the Society of Saint Francis de Sales of Spain, which clarified that the Salesian order in Venezuela would investigate the case.

=== Cases reported by The Washington Post ===
The Washington Post journalist Ana Vanessa Herrero interviewed victims of harassment and ecclesiastical sexual abuse. She also tried to meet with the Venezuelan Episcopal Conference, which did not respond to her interview requests. According to Herrero, there are complaints in at least eleven states of Venezuela.

In Lara state, priest Luis Alberto Mosquera had been accused in 1996 by a twelve-year-old aspiring altar boy of sexually abusing him by threatening him with a gun. Mosquera was convicted to seven years in prison in 2006 for sexual abuse of a six-year-old boy, but served only two years in prison and was then allowed to return to the priesthood.

In Zulia state, priest Rafael Márquez, who ran a network of homes for street children, was charged with violent lewd acts against 12 minors under 16 years of age "in the presence of other children and adolescents". Márquez's sentence had not been made public.

In the state of Anzoátegui, priest Enrique Castro Azócar was accused of sexual abuse on Twitter in 2018 and arrested the following year, pleading guilty to two counts of sexual abuse of a child and being sentenced to five years in prison. The father of one of his victims stated that he had been harassed and threatened because of his request for justice.

In Falcón state, a priest pleaded guilty to committing a carnal act against a 14-year-old girl. He was granted house arrest on the condition that he stay away from the victim, however, he returned to the Church, and was actively participating by June 2022.

According to a court, there was a case in Mérida state where a priest exchanged text messages with a 13-year-old girl, took her to a hotel room and kissed her. The girl testified that the priest tried to lift up her shirt. The priest's lawyers argued that the girl wanted to leave with him and that no sexual act was consummated. He was found not guilty of aggravated lewd acts in 2006.

In most cases, the victims came from environments with limited economic resources. The application of "therapeutic transfer" was evident, used in other cases, where priests with inappropriate behavior and/or proven abuse were relocated to other parts, sometimes other countries, to hide the past of the abusers and avoid police investigations.

== Reactions ==
=== Human rights organizations ===
Following the publication of The Washington Post's report, 66 NGOs for the rights of minors, including CECODAP, signed a joint document where they demanded that the State and the Church investigate the complaints of the American newspaper.

=== Episcopal Conference ===
In 2022, the Church recognized the events and apologized, organizing an investigation into the matter, without clarifying the number of victims and ensuring that measures had been taken in retaliation against the abusers. The first vice president of the Episcopal Conference of Venezuela, Bishop Mario Moronta, declared: "We feel deeply dismayed and hurt by the situations of abuse" and asserted that the Church "has provided collaboration to clarify the facts."

On July 6, 2022, Bishop Moronta announced the suspension and investigation of priest Luis Alberto Mosquera, who had been denounced in the report.

=== United Socialist Party of Venezuela ===
The deputy to the National Assembly and vice president of the United Socialist Party of Venezuela, Diosdado Cabello, exonerated the Venezuelan judicial system for the release of the convicted and their return to the Church, arguing that the entire It was the Church's fault and criticizing the then cardinal Baltazar Porras and the rest of the leadership as "immoral."

== See also ==
- Catholic Church sexual abuse cases in Chile
- Catholic sexual abuse cases in Latin America
- Sexual abuse in Santa Fe de la Vera Cruz archdiocese
- Sexual abuse cases of Marcial Maciel
