= Juan María Leonardi Villasmil =

- Bishop of Punto Fijo
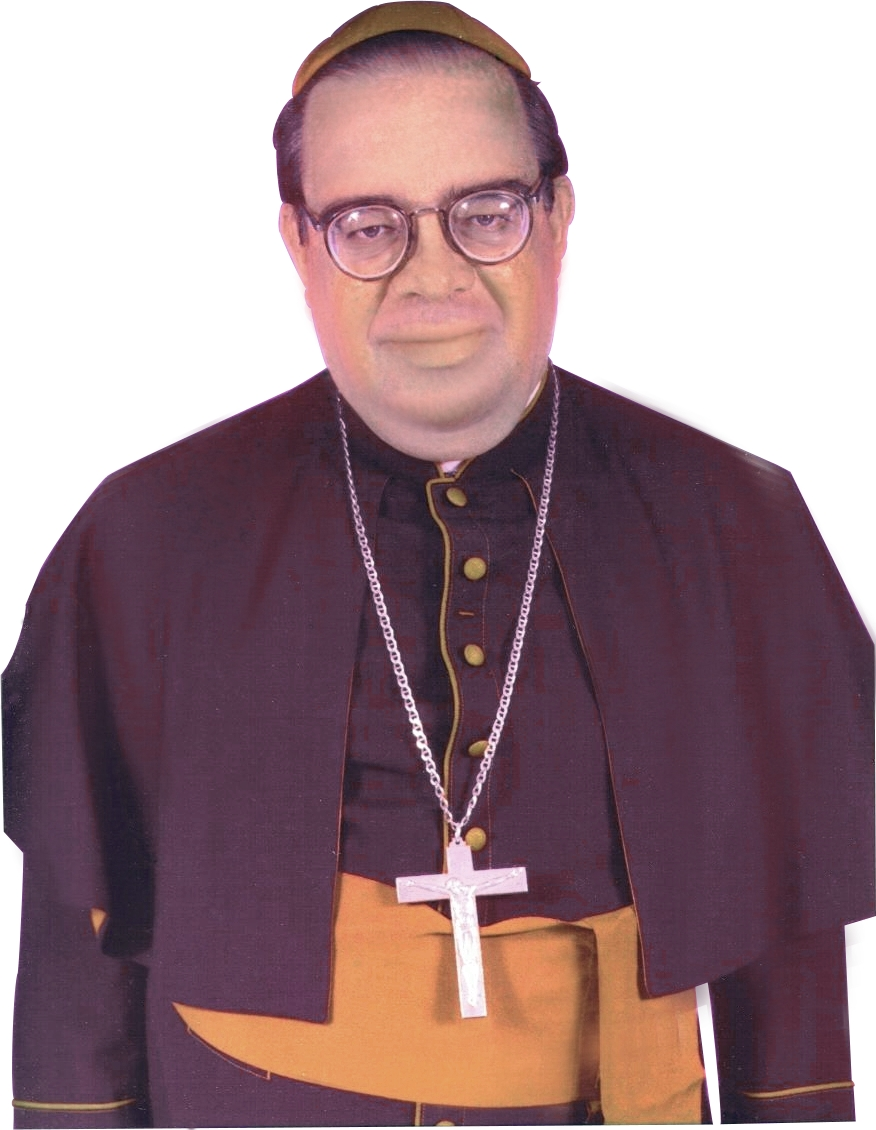
- Church: Catholic Church
- Diocese: Diocese of Punto Fijo
- In office: 12 July 1997 – 7 June 2014
- Predecessor: Diocese erected
- Successor: Carlos Alfredo Cabezas Mendoza
- Previous posts: Titular Bishop of Lesvi (1994-1997); Auxiliary Bishop of Mérida (1994-1997)

Orders
- Ordination: 4 August 1979
- Consecration: 8 April 1994 by Baltazar Enrique Porras Cardozo

Personal details
- Born: 11 February 1947 Boconó, Trujillo, United States of Venezuela
- Died: 7 June 2014 (aged 67) Maracaibo, Zulia, Venezuela

Juan María Leonardi Villasmil (11 February 1947, Boconó – 7 June 2014) was a Roman Catholic bishop.

Ordained to the priesthood in 1979, Villasmil was named titular bishop of Lesvi and auxiliary bishop of the Roman Catholic Archdiocese of Mérida, Venezuela, in 1994. In 1997, he was appointed bishop of the Roman Catholic Diocese of Punto Fijo in 1997. He died while still in office.
