= Cástor Oswaldo Azuaje Pérez =

Venezuelan Catholic bishop (1951–2021)

Càstor Oswaldo Azuaje Pérez
- Bishop of Trujillo
- Church: Catholic Church
- Archdiocese: Archdiocese of Maracaibo (former auxiliary bishop)
- Diocese: Diocese of Trujillo
- See: Trujillo
- Elected: 2012
- In office: 2012–2021
- Predecessor: Vicente Ramón Hernández Peña
- Successor: José Manuel Romero Barrios
- Other posts: Titular Bishop of Vertara (2007–2012); Auxiliary Bishop of Maracaibo (2007–2012)

Orders
- Ordination: 1975
- Consecration: 2007 by Ubaldo Ramón Santana Sequera, Ramón Antonio Linares Sandoval, and Baltazar Enrique Porras Cardozo
- Rank: Bishop

Personal details
- Born: Càstor Oswaldo Azuaje Pérez; October 19, 1951 Venezuela
- Died: January 8, 2021 (aged 69) Valera, Trujillo, Venezuela
- Denomination: Catholic
- Occupation: Bishop

Càstor Oswaldo Azuaje Pérez (19 October 1951 – 8 January 2021) was a Venezuelan Catholic bishop.

== Biography ==
He was born in Venezuela and was ordained to the priesthood in 1975. He served as titular bishop of Vertara and as auxiliary bishop of the Archdiocese of Maracaibo, Venezuela, from 2007 to 2012. He then served as bishop of the Diocese of Trujillo, from 2012 until his death in 2021.

Azuaje Pérez died from COVID-19 in Valera, Trujillo, on 8 January 2021, at the age of 69, during the COVID-19 pandemic in Venezuela.

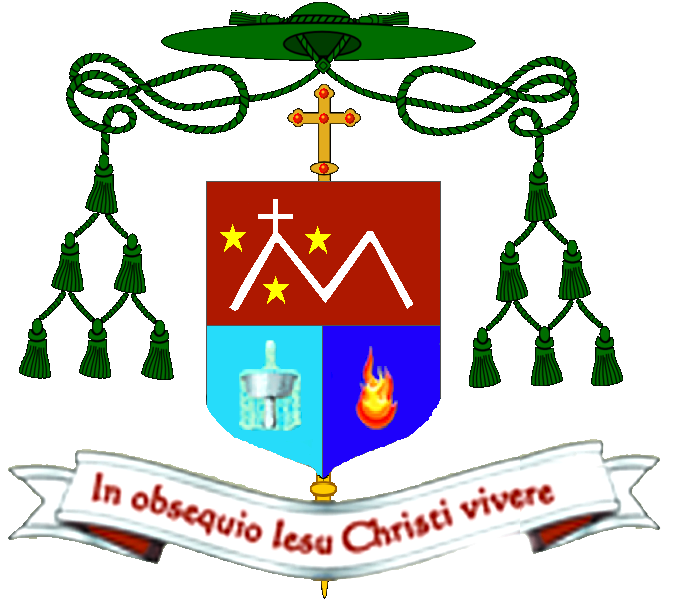
Coat of arms
