= Diocese of San Cristóbal de Venezuela =

Roman Catholic diocese in Venezuela

Diocese of San Cristóbal de Venezuela Dioecesis Sancti Christophori in Venetiola

Catholic

Location
- Country: Venezuela
- Ecclesiastical province: Mérida

Statistics
- Area: 11,000 km^{2} (4,200 sq mi)
- Population: Total; Catholics: (as of 2004); 1,500,000; 1,250,000 (83.3%)

Information
- Rite: Latin Rite
- Established: 12 October 1922 (104 years ago)
- Cathedral: Catedral de San Cristóbal

Current leadership
- Pope: Leo XIV
- Bishop: Lisandro Alirio Rivas Durán
- Auxiliary Bishops: Juan Alberto Ayala Ramírez

Map

The Roman Catholic Diocese of San Cristóbal de Venezuela (Latin: Dioecesis Sancti Christophori in Venetiola) is a diocese located in the city of San Cristóbal in the ecclesiastical province of Mérida in Venezuela.

== History ==
On 12 October 1922 Pope Pius XI established the Diocese of San Cristóbal de Venezuela from the Diocese of Mérida.

== Special churches ==
- Minor Basilicas:
  - Basílica de Nuestra Señora de la Consolación, Táriba
  - Basílica del Espíritu Santo, La Grita

== Bishops ==
=== Ordinaries ===
- Tomás Antonio Sanmiguel Díaz (22 June 1923 – 6 July 1937)
- Rafael Ignacio Arias Blanco (12 November 1939 – 23 April 1952) Appointed, Coadjutor Archbishop of Caracas
- Alejandro Fernández Feo-Tinico (23 April 1952 – 26 October 1984)
- Marco Tulio Ramírez Roa (26 October 1984 – 26 February 1998)
- Mario del Valle Moronta Rodríguez (14 April 1999 – 14 December 2024)
- Lisandro Alirio Rivas Durán (14 December 2024 – present)

=== Auxiliary Bishop ===
- Juan Alberto Ayala Ramírez (2020-

=== Other priests of this diocese who became bishops ===
- José Léon Rojas Chaparro, appointed Coadjutor Bishop of Trujillo in 1961
- José Hernán Sánchez Porras, appointed Bishop of Venezuela, Military in 2000
- Jorge Anibal Quintero Chacón, appointed Bishop of Margarita in 2008
- Francisco Gerardo Escalante Molina, appointed nuncio and titular Archbishop in 2016

== See also ==
- Roman Catholicism in Venezuela

== Sources ==
- GCatholic.org
- Catholic Hierarchy ^{[self-published]}
