= Diocese of Punto Fijo =

Roman Catholic diocese in Venezuela

Diocese of Punto Fijo Dioecesis Punctifixensis

Catholic
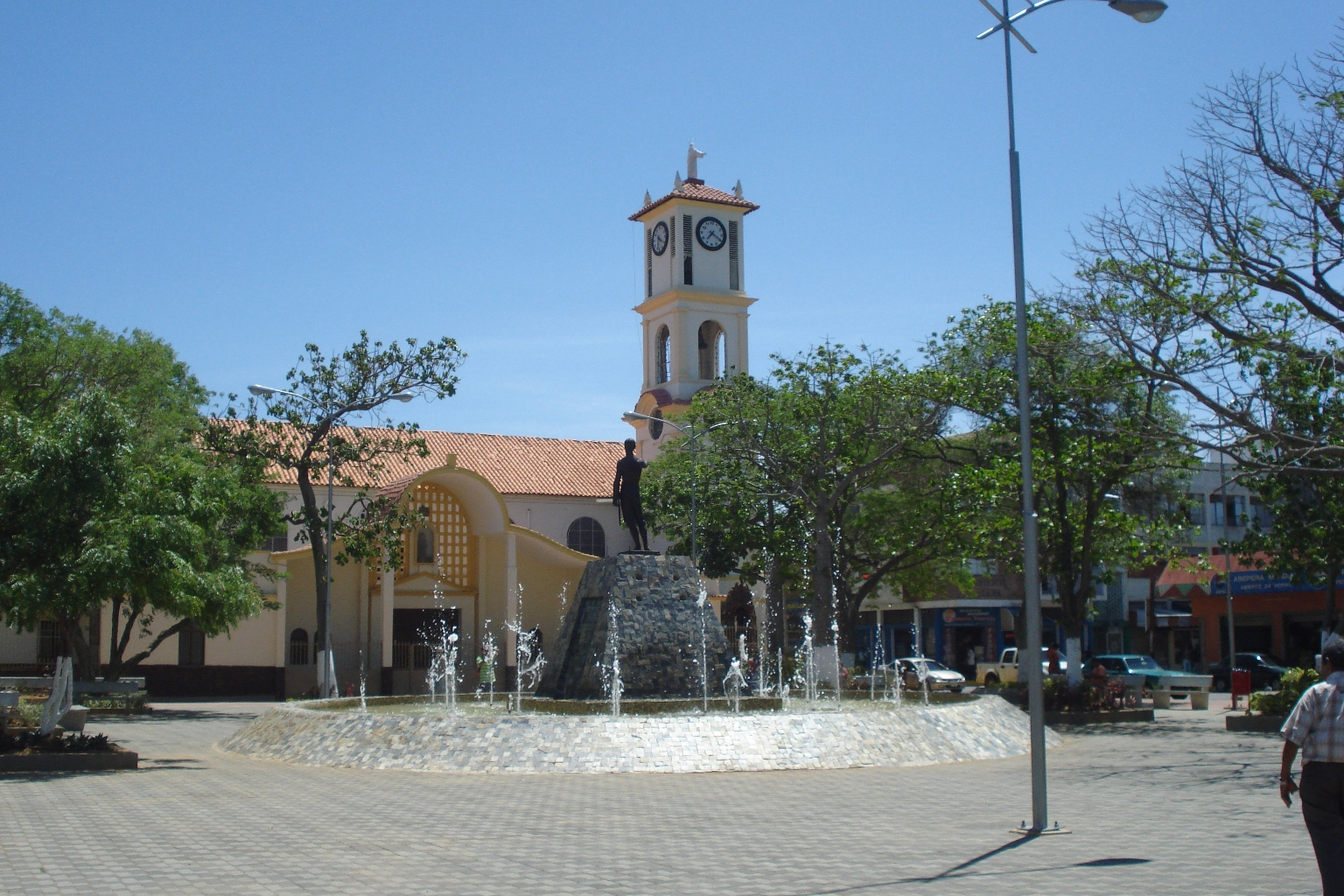
- Cathedral of Our Lady of Coromoto

Location
- Country: Venezuela
- Ecclesiastical province: Coro

Statistics
- Area: 3,405 km^{2} (1,315 sq mi)
- Population: Total; Catholics: (as of 2004); 267,700; 252,954 (94.5%)

Information
- Denomination: Catholic Church
- Rite: Latin Rite
- Established: 12 July 1997 (29 years ago)
- Cathedral: Catedral Nuestra Señora de Coromoto

Current leadership
- Pope: Leo XIV
- Bishop: Luis Enrique Rojas Ruiz

Map

The Roman Catholic Diocese of Punto Fijo (Latin: Dioecesis Punctifixensis) is a diocese located in the city of Punto Fijo in the ecclesiastical province of Coro in western Venezuela.

== History ==
On 12 July 1997 Pope John Paul II established the Diocese of Punto Fijo from the Diocese of Coro.

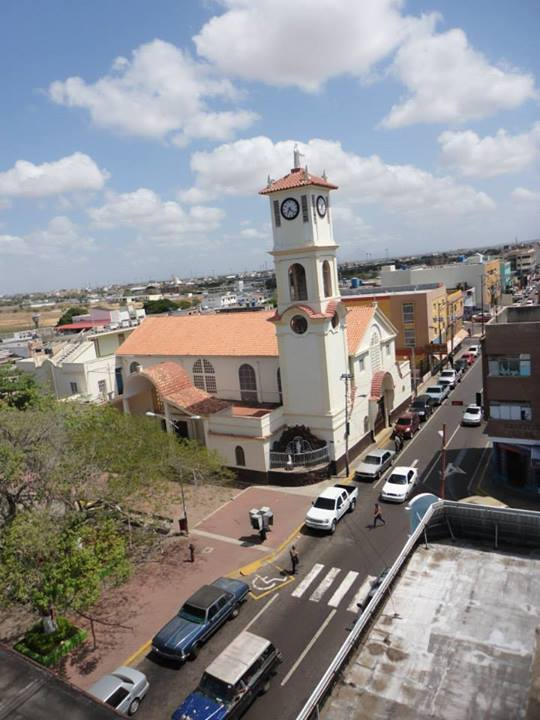
Our Lady of Coromoto Cathedral

In 2020, the Papal Foundation awarded the Diocese a grant of $15,600 for meals for children and seniors. In 2026, formation discernment was held in the Diocese, organized by the Pontifical Mission Society.

== Bishops ==
- Juan María Leonardi Villasmil (12 July 1997 – 7 June 2014)
- Carlos Alfredo Cabezas Mendoza (4 June 2016 – 8 December 2022), appointed Bishop of Ciudad Guayana
- Luis Enrique Rojas Ruiz (12 July 2023 – Present)

== See also ==
- Roman Catholicism in Venezuela
