= Catholic Church in Venezuela =

The Catholic Church in Venezuela is part of the worldwide Catholic Church, under the spiritual leadership of the Pope in Rome. The Roman Catholic Church in Venezuela comprises nine archdioceses, three vicariates, a military ordinariate, and two Eastern Rite exarchates under the spiritual leadership of the Pope, the Curia in Rome and the Venezuelan Bishops Conference. According to The World Factbook, 96% of the population was Roman Catholic in 2009. In 2018, Latinobarómetro, estimated that 66% of the population is Roman Catholic.

Since the Second Vatican Council, the Roman Catholic Church in Venezuela has been weakened by a lack of diocesan and religious vocations. Many priests serving in Venezuela are foreign-born. Before President Hugo Chávez's government took power, Protestant churches began to successfully proselytize, especially among the urban poor; however, this diminished into the 21st century. In the past, the Catholic Church did not have the funds, the personnel, or the enthusiasm to stem effectively this new challenge to its hegemony, but it believed it faced a greater threat with the new government of Chávez.

Although President Chávez self-identified as a practicing Roman Catholic, his policies troubled the Venezuelan Roman Catholic hierarchy, especially in the area of religious education. Besides its universities and colleges, the Roman Catholic Church also administers some 700 other schools throughout the country, mostly subsidized by the Venezuelan state. In 2007, Cardinal Jorge Urosa, the Archbishop of Caracas, called for peaceful demonstrations against any direct government involvement in overseeing the Church's administration of schools. The Church also was critical of the government’s goal to remove religious education from public schools during normal school hours.

== Theology ==
Map of dioceses of Venezuela

The Catholic Church in Venezuela heavily focuses on the veneration of the Virgin Mary. This is exemplified by such figures as the Our Lady of Coromoto in Portuguesa state, Virgen del Valle in Nueva Esparta and Our Lady of the Rosary of Chiquinquirá in the western part of the country.

== History ==
The history of Roman Catholicism in Venezuela dates back to the colonial period. Historically, the church has never been as prominent in Venezuela as it has in neighboring Colombia. In addition, that the Spanish clergy, in general, sided with their mother country rather than with the forces of independence, did not endear the church to the early Venezuelan patriots.

=== Colonial period ===
In 1515 Cumaná was the first European settlement founded in South America by Franciscans and Dominicans, but the monks there were being harassed by indigenous people and Spaniards operating slave raids from the nearby island of Cubagua. Friars founded it with the name of Nueva Toledo, due to successful attacks by the indigenous people, it had to be refounded several times. Bartolomé de las Casas, attempting a peaceful colonization scheme, was pre-empted by Gonzalo de Ocampo's 1521 punitive raids against the local indigenous people, in retaliation for the destruction of the Dominican convent at Chichiriviche.

Coro is the oldest city in the west of Venezuela. It was founded on July 26, 1527, by Juan de Ampíes as Santa Ana de Coro. It has a wide cultural tradition that comes from being the urban settlement founded by the Spanish conquerors who colonized the interior of the continent. It was the first capital of the Venezuela Province and head of the first bishop founded in South America. It was established on June 21, 1531, by the bull Pro Excellenti Praeeminentia of the Pope Clement VII. That diocese was suppressed on 20 June 1637 and its territory used to establish the Diocese of Caracas.

The Jesuits and Capuchin missionaries were part of the white population penetration, for which they learned the aboriginal languages. In 1672 Francisco de Puente la Reina and 10 other capuchin friars, passed to Cumaná where they resided during 40 years. This Navarrese founded the Conversion of the Christian Doctrine for the Chaima Indians. Friar Francisco Javier de Alfaro (Manuel Frías) moved from the convent of Los Arcos to Maracaibo; wrote a catechism for each group of native coianos, chaques and anatomists. Nicolás de Renteria missioned in Los Llanos in 1663. Friar Antonio de Idiazabal arrived in Venezuela in 1672 and died, ill, in Cumaná.

The expulsion of the Jesuits from Spain and its colonies was ordered by King Charles III in 1767 following the recent examples set by Portugal in 1759 and France in 1762. On the grounds that they had instigated the popular uprisings associated with the Esquilache Riots. Six years later, the Spanish monarch succeeded in having Pope Clement XIV suppress the Jesuit Order.

The Diocese of Caracas was elevated to Metropolitan Archdiocese by papal bull In universalis ecclesiae regimine issued by Pope Pius VII in the Basilica Santa Maria Maggiore in Rome on November 24, 1803, until this date having been a suffragan in the Ecclesiastical Province of the Archdiocese of Santo Domingo on Hispaniola, now in the Dominican Republic and primatial see of the Americas.

=== After the independence of Venezuela ===
Until the middle of the nineteenth century, the ranking clergy had close ties with the governing conservative oligarchy, and the church played a dominant role in the educational system. The rise to power of Liberals in the latter half of the nineteenth century, however, ushered in a period of anticlericalism. The government of Antonio Guzmán Blanco virtually crushed the institutional life of the church, even attempting to legalize the marriage of priests. These anticlerical policies remained in force for decades afterward.

=== 20th century ===
It was not until the mid-twentieth century that, under the influence of the Christian social movement that began to criticize the maldistribution of wealth, the church regained some of its former influence. Roman Catholic laymen played a prominent role in the founding of Copei (Social Christian Party) in 1946, and the announced disapproval of the church contributed to the fall of the dictator Marcos Pérez Jiménez in 1958. In the 1960s, the involvement of the church in education and welfare increased and, although the church had no formal ties with COPEI, many believed that the support of clergymen and church-affiliated institutions contributed to the electoral successes of COPEI in 1968 and 1978.

=== Present day ===
According to some sources, the church in Venezuela has been weakened by a traditional lack of native vocations. Many priests serving in Venezuela are foreign-born, although the inclusion of foreign clergy seems to be encouraged by many bishops throughout the Catholic world, especially in the United States. Before the government of Hugo Chávez, charismatic Protestant churches began to proselyte successfully, especially among the urban poor, although this has not posed a threat to the church nearly as much as the new government of Chávez has, especially in relation to religious education in public schools and the running of the church's 700 religious schools. Chávez was very dismissive of the role of the Catholic Church's bishops in Venezuelan society.

The Venezuelan Catholic Church has been vocal in opposing Nicolás Maduro's administration. Pope Francis was vocally neutral during the 2019 Venezuelan presidential crisis. The Episcopal Conference of Venezuela rejected Luis Parra's claim to the presidency of the National Assembly during a disrupted Board of Directors internal election on 5 January 2020. Days later, Luis Parra tried to attend a meeting of the organization alongside armed forces but he was denied entry.

Following the arrest of Nicolás Maduro by US forces, the Catholic Bishops issued a statement calling for unity and national reconciliation. The bishops also called for respect for national sovereignty, the release of all political prisoners and for money from the oil industry to be used to offset poverty.

In October 2026 the bishops issued a new statement calling for elections and the repeal of laws restricting the activity of NGOs in the country.

== See also ==
- Religion in Venezuela
- List of Catholic dioceses in Venezuela
- Evangelical Council of Venezuela
- Pan-Amazonian Ecclesial Network (REPAM)
- Catholic Church sexual abuse cases in Venezuela
