= García Fernández de Villamayor =

Castilian nobleman (c. 1170 – c. 1241)

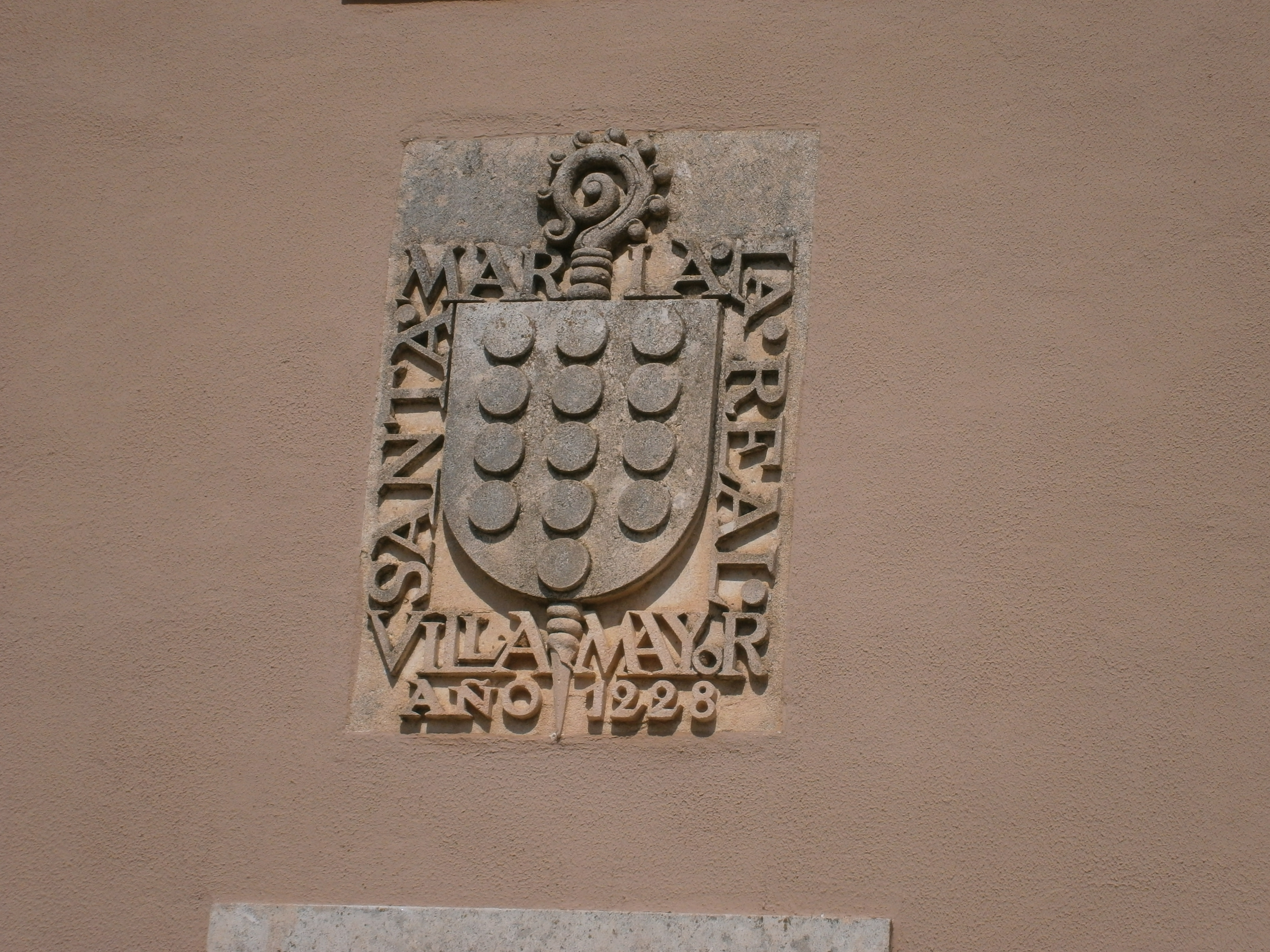
Monasterio de Villamayor de los Montes - 3

García Fernández de Villamayor (c. 1170 – c. 1241) was a Castilian nobleman.

His career unfolded primarily at court, where he served as Mayordomo mayor (royal high steward) to Queen Eleanor, Queen Berengaria, and King Ferdinand III. Along with his wife Mayor Arias, he was in charge of the education of Infante Alfonso, the first-born son of King Ferdinand who went on to become King Alfonso X.

== Biography ==
=== Family origins ===
García Fernández, founder of the House of Villamayor, was probably born in the 1170s near Villaldemiro. His name first appears on a document of 1194 in which the grandchildren of Ordoño Pérez and Urraca Fernández granted to the Bishop of Burgos properties their grandparents held in the town of Las Hormazas.

Although history knows him as García (or Garcí) Fernández de Villamayor, in the sources he is identified as "de Villaldemiro". Villamayor and Villaldemiro are towns located about 20 km south of Burgos, and it is in this area, around the basins of the rivers Arlanzón and Arlanza, that his holdings were clustered.

There is no direct documentary evidence to confirm the family origins of García Fernández. It has been proposed that he was a grandson of the García Ordóñez de Villamayor who appears in the 1170 treaty between Alfonso VIII of Castile and Alfonso II of Aragon, which would make his family a secondary branch of the House of Aza, although according to the most reliable studies, he was a descendant of Martín Díaz, member of a noble family of Tierra de Campos. His father was likely the same Fernando García who appears as a signatory to royal privileges during the reign of Alfonso VIII and who took part in 1212 in the Battle of Las Navas de Tolosa, although again there is no explicit confirmation in the documentary record. Moreover, his maternal ancestry is completely unknown.

García Fernández's first wife was Teresa Muñoz, to whom he was already married in 1203 and who died around 1212. She is possibly the daughter of Muño García and the sister of Ruy Muñoz de Guzmán (forebear of the House of Guzmán) and she held a sizeable inheritance concentrated in the area around Lerma. Three children were born of this marriage: Rodrigo, Fernando, and Mayor, with whom García Fernández signed an agreement in 1228 regarding the distribution of their mother's bequests. Another indication of the close relationship with the House of Guzmán is provided by the donations of the children of García Fernández to the Royal Abbey of Saint Dominic of Caleruega, made due to the "great affinity" which united them with his contemporary Saint Dominic.

After the death of Teresa Muñoz, and no later than 1216, García Fernández married Mayor Arias. At least seven children were born of this union: Juan, Alfonso, Diego, Teresa, Marina, Urraca, and Mencía. The family origins of Mayor are uncertain, although there are many indications of a close relationship with Galicia and the powerful Galician House of Limia.

=== Royal high steward ===
The post of Mayordomo mayor (maiordomus curie regis or royal high steward) was an important honor reserved for the foremost figures of the nobility. In contrast with those of the alférez, the obligations of the high steward touched upon the private sphere of the sovereign: his home, his table, the administration of the treasury, and the control of revenues and expenses, functions which conferred political influence and opportunities for personal enrichment. The high steward supervised a large number of servants, waiters, groomsmen, larderers, etc. Moreover, high stewards appear regularly as signatories to royal charters.

In principle, García Fernández can be considered to have belonged, by lineage and patrimony, to the middle nobility, far from the influence and prestige enjoyed at the time by families such as the House of Lara or the House of Haro. His later successful rise in social standing was due not to military prowess or matrimonial alliances, but rather to his position at court. He was high steward to Queen Eleanor, wife of King Alfonso VIII, between 1211 and 1213; to Queen Berengaria, daughter of Alfonso VIII and mother of Ferdinand III between 1217 and 1232; and finally to Ferdinand III himself between 1232 and 1238. He also appears on some documents as royal high steward to Ferdinand III between 1224 and 1230, a time when the post was held by Gonzalo Rodríguez Girón. It is possible that this indicates a close relationship with the Girón family, already attested in other sources, and that García Fernández served as steward to Gonzalo as well as to Queen Berengaria.

=== Education of Alfonso X and later career ===
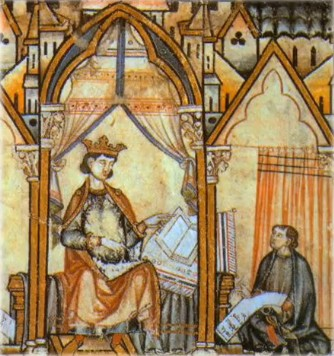
Alfonso X the Wise. Cantigas de Santa Maria (13th century)

According to the prevailing custom at court concerning the education of royal infantes, a custom later set down in the Siete Partidas, García Fernández was designated tutor to future King Alfonso X the Wise, along with Urraca Pérez as nanny. It seems that Alfonso recalled this period with nostalgia and gratitude; years later he justified some exemptions granted to the village of Celada del Camino with the following words:

(...) because Don García Ferrandez [sic] and his wife Doña Mayor Arias raised me and did me many services and especially because they raised me in Villaldemiro and in Celada.

— Charter of privileges granted to Celada del Camino by Alfonso X (1255)

It was in these years that Alfonso X encountered the Galician-Portuguese language, which he later would use in the composition of the Cantigas de Santa Maria.

In these important responsibilities the confidence which Berengaria and Ferdinand III placed in him was confirmed. He supported them during the rebellion of the nobility led by the House of Lara and later accompanied the king at the Siege of Jaén in 1230. Once his tutelage of Alfonso had come to an end, he became more involved in the military campaigns in Andalusia: he held the post of alcaide (commander of the fortress) of Úbeda in 1233 immediately after the city was taken, and took part, along with Ferdinand, in the conquest of Córdoba in 1236.

The royal family's favor also extended to his son Juan, who from 1242 already appears as a signatory to royal privileges granted by Ferdinand III, and who was appointed royal high steward by Alfonso X (who must have been his childhood playmate) as soon as he acceded to the throne. He held this post from 1252 to 1260, when he was named admiral of the fleet deployed to battle the Marinids in the attack on the port of Salé, and in the later conquest of Cádiz in 1264. Juan also appears, along with his brother Alfonso, as the men in charge of the demarcation of the border between Castile and Portugal as agreed in 1263.

=== Death ===
García Fernández dictated his will on 20 October 1241, according to a document whose authenticity is disputed due to its being a much later copy and to the problems of dating it presents:

This charter was made in Villaldemiro, Sunday the twentieth of October, in the year of Our Lord one thousand two hundred forty-one, of the Spanish Era year one thousand two hundred seventy-eight

— Testament of García Fernández

Spanish Era year 1278 indeed corresponds to AD 1240, but 20 October fell on a Sunday in 1241. In any event, García Fernández had already died by 1242 when his wife, Mayor Arias, made donations in his memory to Juan de Soria, Bishop of Burgos and to the Cathedral of Toledo.

The will allows us to measure the extent of his fortune at the time of his death. He bequeathed a total of 6000 maravedís to several ecclesiastical institutions, especially to Cistercian monasteries, including the one at Villamayor, to which he left a fifth of his personal effects and landed estates. To his son Juan went his knightly attire, his horse to the Knights Templar, and three goshawks to Queen Berengaria. He left his jewelry and other goods, not only to his wife and children, but also to the abbey at Villamayor and Infante Alfonso. To free those of his vassals who were then prisoners of the Moors he also set aside quantities between 100 and 500 maravedís, according to each case.

== Landed estates ==
García Fernández came to hold properties or feudal rights across a wide area which spread from Galicia to Andalusia. There is documentation confirming 75 such holdings, of which 72 were concentrated in Castile.

Throughout most of his life García Fernández pursued an active policy of land acquisition. In the first stage, coinciding with the period of his marriage to Teresa Muñoz from 1203 to 1212, these acquisitions centered on the area around Villaldemiro.

Between 1212 and 1216 the purchases halted, probably due to the repercussions of the Battle of Las Navas de Tolosa, in which he may have taken part, the death of Alfonso VIII, and the consequent political agitation. In 1216 acquisitions are recorded in Vilviestre de Muñó, near Villaldemiro, possibly related to his marriage to Mayor Arias.

The period of greatest expansion of his landed holdings corresponds to the years between 1219 and 1234, when his position at court as royal high steward under Berengaria and Ferdinand III allowed him to amass riches sufficient for the enlargement of his legacy. At the end of this period, in 1232 when he acceded to the position of royal high steward, we find the only case in which he held sole lordship over a village when the king granted him Manzaneda, in the Galician comarca of A Limia, in compensation, according to the donation document, for his support in attaining the crown of León. The unusual location could be related to the family origins of Mayor Arias, to whom in 1255 Alfonso X made another donation with the same conditions, that of Cevico de la Torre due to the "many services he had done for him". In this period he made several acquisitions in Celada, an area where the king himself had spent part of his childhood. Also important were the donations he received from the king in Andalusia as a result of the Castilian conquests of the period. These may include lands in Baeza, Úbeda, and Córdoba, as well as those received after his death by his wife and children in Seville and Benacazón.

Nevertheless from 1234 up to his death seven years later the purchases ceased, although his wife Mayor Arias added to them in later years. One possible explanation is a greater involvement in the military campaigns of the Reconquista in Andalusia.

Most of García Fernández's possessions were acquired as behetrías (communities with the right to choose their own lord) and, in fact, a good part of the information we have on their later development comes from the Becerro de las Behetrías de Castilla. Eventually his expansive domains were split up, due especially to the great number of his descendants, and by the middle of the 14th century the family held scant feudal rights even in the area of Villamayor.

=== Abbey of Santa María la Real of Villamayor ===
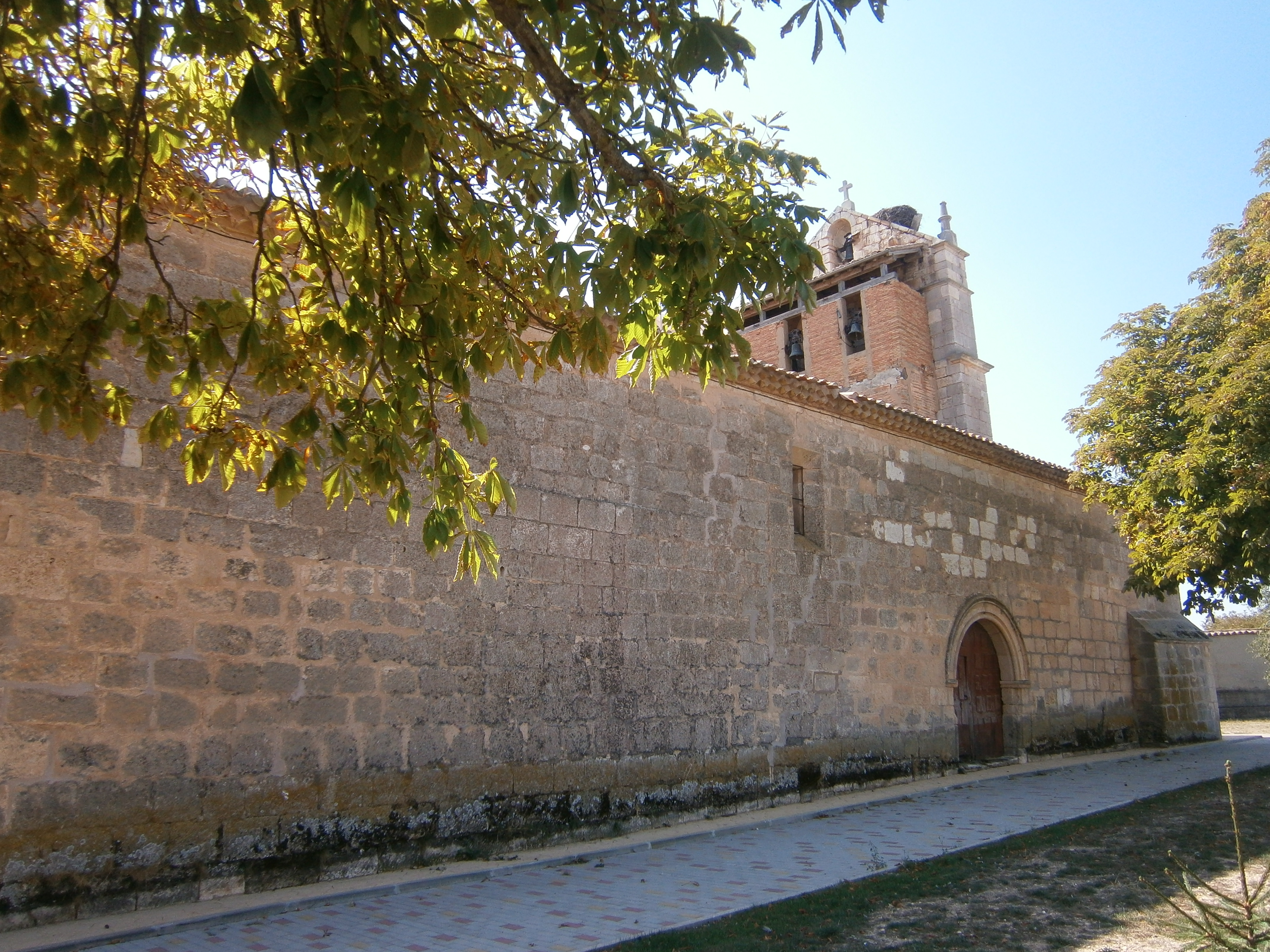
Monastery of Villamayor.

In 1223, García Fernández acquired a monastery dating back to the 11th or early 12th century and dedicated to Saint Vincent of Saragossa, and turned it into a Cistercian convent dedicated to Mary and Saint Vincent which was inaugurated in 1228. He placed it under the dependency of the Abbey of Santa María la Real de Las Huelgas in Burgos, while allowing it its legal and patrimonial independence. García Fernández endowed it abundantly both at its foundation as well as in his will.

It is from the archives of this abbey that a good part of the information we have on García Fernández comes: some 60 documents referring directly to him or to his wife Mayor Arias. Female members of the family continued to hold key posts in the abbey long after his death. The first abbess was Marina Arias, probably Mayor's sister, and García's daughters Marina and Mayor also led the community. The latter was still the abbess in 1286 when two granddaughters of the founder occupied the posts of prioress and precentrix.

== Marriage and children ==
García Fernández had three children from his marriage to Teresa Muñoz (c. 1203 – c. 1212):

- Rodrigo García de Villamayor (before 1212 – c. 1255)
- Fernán García de Villamayor (before 1212 – after 1259)
- Mayor García de Villamayor (before 1212 – after 1286)

From his second marriage to Mayor Arias (c. 1216 – c. 1241) were the following children:

- Juan García de Villamayor (before 1228 – after June 1266), served as mayordomo mayor to King Alfonso X
- Alfonso García de Villamayor (before 1226 – c. 1292), served as mayordomo mayor to King Alfonso X and adelantado mayor of Andalusia, and married Leonor Alfonso, illegitimate daughter of Alfonso de Molina, one of his descendants would be María Micaela G. de Molina who would be mistress of.
- Diego García de Villamayor (after 1216 – after 1286)
- Mencía García de Villamayor (after 1216 – after February 1262)
- Marina García de Villamayor (after 1216 – after February 1262)
- Teresa García de Villamayor (after 1216 – after February 1262)
- Urraca García de Villamayor (after 1216 – ?)

It is possible, although doubtful, that Elvira and Mayor were also children of this union.

| Preceded by Gonzalo Rodríguez Girón | High Steward of the King of Castile; 1232–1238 | Succeeded by Rodrigo González Girón |

== Bibliography ==
- Álvarez Borge, Ignacio (2008). "Los dominios de un noble en la corte castellana en la primera mitad del siglo XIII. García Fernández de Villamayor". Hispania. Revista Española de Historia (in Spanish). LXVIII (230). Madrid: Instituto de Historia, CCHS, CSIC: 647–706. ISSN 0018-2141.
- Estepa Díez, Carlos (2003). Las Behetrías Castellanas (in Spanish). Vol. 1. Valladolid: Junta de Castilla y León, Consejería de Cultura y Turismo. ISBN 9788497181181.
- Martínez Díez, Gonzalo (1994). "Orígenes familiares de Santo Domingo, los linajes de Aza y Guzmán". In Aniz Iriarte, Cándido; Díaz Martín, Luis Vicente (eds.). Santo Domingo de Caleruega, en su contexto socio-político, 1170-1221 (in Spanish). Editorial San Esteban. pp. 173–228. ISBN 9788487557774.
- Martínez Díez, Gonzalo; González Sánchez, Vidal (2000). Colección diplomática. Monasterio Cisterciense de Santa María la Real. Villamayor de los Montes (in Spanish). Burgos: Monasterio de Santa María la Real de Villamayor de los Montes. ISBN 9788487152627.
- Martínez Sopena, Pascual (1985). La Tierra de Campos occidental. Poblamiento, poder y comunidad del siglo X al XIII (in Spanish). Institución Cultural Simancas (Diputación Provincial de Valladolid). ISBN 9788450513905.
- Valdeón Baruque, Julio (2003). Alfonso X el Sabio: La forja de la España moderna (in Spanish). Círculo de Lectores, S.L. ISBN 84-672-1265-9.
- Veas Arteseros, Francisco; Veas Arteseros, María del Carmen (1986). "Alférez Mayor y Mayordomo Real en el siglo XIII". Miscelánea Medieval Murciana, Área de Historia Medieval (in Spanish). XIII. ISSN 0210-4903. Archived from the original on 2009-12-25.
