= Bernard Marie Fansaka Biniama =

Congolese Catholic prelate (born 1959)

The Most Reverend Bernard Marie Fansaka Biniama
- Bishop Emeritus of Popokabaka, Democratic Republic of the Congo
- Church: Catholic Church
- Archdiocese: Roman Catholic Archdiocese of Kinshasa
- See: Roman Catholic Diocese of Popokabaka
- Appointed: 29 June 2020
- Installed: 23 August 2020
- Term ended: 28 January 2026
- Predecessor: Louis Nzala Kianza
- Successor: Vacant

Orders
- Ordination: 21 February 1988
- Consecration: 23 August 2020 by Cardinal Fridolin Ambongo Besungu
- Rank: Bishop

Personal details
- Born: Bernard Marie Fansaka Biniama; 29 June 1959 (age 67) Misay, Archdiocese of Kinshasa, Kwango Province, Democratic Republic of the Congo

Styles of Bernard Marie Fansaka Biniama
- Reference style: Your Lordship; The Most Reverend
- Spoken style: His Lordship
- Religious style: Bishop

Bernard Marie Fansaka Biniama (born 29 June 1959) is a Congolese Catholic prelate who was the bishop of the Roman Catholic Diocese of Popokabaka in the Democratic Republic of the Congo from 29 June 2020 until his resignation on 28 January 2026. Before that, from 21 June 1988 until he was appointed bishop, he was a priest of the Roman Catholic Diocese of Kenge. He was appointed bishop on 29 June 2020 by Pope Francis. He was consecrated as bishop and installed at Popokabaka, Democratic Congo on 23 August 2020. His resignation was accepted by Pope Leo XIV on 28 January 2026.

== Background and education ==
He was born on 29 June 1959 in Misay, Bandundu Province (today Kwango Province), Democratic Congo. He attended the Saint Charles Lwanga Minor Seminary in Katende for his secondary school education. He studied at the faculty of philosophy at the Saint Augustin Interdiocesan Major Seminary in Kalonda from 1980 until 1983. He transferred to the faculty of theology at the Saint Cyprien Interdiocesan Major Seminary in Kikwit. He holds a Licentiate in biblical theology, awarded by the Catholic University of the Congo in 1994. He obtained a Doctorate in the same subject, from the Catholic University of Central Africa, in Cameroon in 2001, having studied there since 1998.

== Priest ==
On 21 February 1988, he was ordained a priest of the Roman Catholic Diocese of Kenge. He served as priest until 29 June 2020.

While a priest, he served in various roles including as:

- Teacher in the Saint Charles Lwanga Minor Seminary from 1981 until 1991.
- Studies for a licentiate in biblical theology at the Universitè Catholique du Congo from 1991 until 1994.
- Teacher at Saint Cyprien Minor Seminary in Kikwit from 1994 until 1998.
- Studies for a doctorate in biblical theology from the Catholic University of Central Africa in Yaoundé, Cameroon from 1998 until 2001.
- Parish priest of Notre Dame du Rosaire Parish, in Bandundu-Ville from 2003 until 2016.
- Founded the Centre des Etudes Ethnologiques et Sociologiques de Bandundu (CEESBA), in Bandundu-Ville in 2003.
- Director of CEESBA since 2003.
- Moderator of the diocesan clergy of Kenge Catholic Dioces from 2006 until 2020.
- Provincial secretary of the Political and Social Commission of the Episcopal Assembly of the Ecclesiastical Province of Kinshasa, since 2008.
- Resident Formator at the Interdiocesan Philosophy Seminary of Kalonda from 2018 until 2020.
- Lecturer at St. Cyprien Major Seminary in Kikwit from 2018 until 2020.

== Bishop ==
Pope Francis appointed him Bishop of the Roman Catholic Diocese of Popokabaka on 29 June 2020. He was consecrated and installed at Popokabaka on 23 August 2020 by the hands of Cardinal Fridolin Ambongo Besungu, Archbishop of Kinshasa assisted by Cardinal Laurent Monsengwo Pasinya, Archbishop Emeritus of Kinshasa and Bishop José Moko Ekanga, Bishop of Idiofa.

On 28 January 2026, Pope Leo XIV accepted the resignation letter submitted by Bishop Bernard Marie Fansaka Biniama from the pastoral care of the Diocese of Popokabaka. The Holy Father appointed the Reverend Abbot Cyrille Ikomba Mankelele to be Apostolic Administrator of the diocese until a suitable successor bishop is appointed.

== See also ==
- Catholic Church in the Democratic Republic of the Congo

== Succession table ==
Catholic Church titles
Preceded by Louis Nzala Kianza (22 April 1996 - 29 June 2020)	Bishop of Popokabaka (since 29 June 2020)	Succeeded by Vacant
