= Diocese of Thucca Terenbenthina =

Roman Catholic titular see

The Diocese of Thucca Terenbenthina is an ancient Titular See of the Roman Catholic Church. The diocese is also known as Tucca Terebentina or دڨة, (Latin : Dioecesis Thuccensis Terebenthina ).

== History ==
Also known as Tucca Terebentina, the diocese is an ancient episcopal see of the Roman province of Byzacena. In antiquity the bishopric was centered on Dougga.

The diocese was founded during the Roman Empire and survived through the Arian Vandal and Orthodox Byzantine empires, only ceasing to function with the Muslim conquest of the Maghreb. The bishopric was re-founded in name at least in the 20th century and it remains today a Roman Catholic Church titular see.

Very little is known of the history of the Bishopric. The donatist bishop Pascasio, who was present at the Carthage conference of 411 may have belonged to this town but it is uncertain.

Today Thucca Terebentina survives as a titular bishop's seat having been re-founded in the 1930s and the current titular bishop is Gerardo Antonio Zerdín Bukovec, apostolic vicar of San Ramón. Modern bishops have included:

- André Lefebvre (Bishop),(1967 - 1976 ) who was dismissed.
- Pío Bello Ricardo, (1977 - 1981) who was appointed bishop of Los Teques.
- Luis Sáinz Hinojosa,(1982 - 1987 ) who was appointed archbishop of La Paz.
- Gerardo Antonio Zerdín Bukovec, who has held the office since 19 January 2002.
