= Timothée Bodika Mansiyai =

Congolese Catholic prelate (born in 1964)

The Most Reverend Timothée Bodika Mansiyai
- Bishop of Kikwit, Democratic Republic of the Congo
- Church: Catholic Church
- Archdiocese: Roman Catholic Archdiocese of Kinshasa
- See: Roman Catholic Diocese of Kikwit
- Appointed: 19 November 2016
- Installed: 4 December 2016
- Predecessor: Marie-Edouard Mununu Kasiala
- Successor: Incumbent
- Other post: Auxiliary Bishop of Kinshasa (2 February 2012 - 19 November 2016)

Orders
- Ordination: 1 August 1990 by Eugène Moke Motsüri
- Consecration: 15 April 2012 by Cardinal Laurent Monsengwo Pasinya
- Rank: Bishop

Personal details
- Born: Timothée Bodika Mansiyai; 1 January 1962 (age 64) Kinshasa, Archdiocese of Kinshasa, Democratic Republic of the Congo

Styles of Timothée Bodika Mansiyai
- Reference style: Your Lordship; The Most Reverend
- Spoken style: His Lordship
- Religious style: Bishop

Timothée Bodika Mansiyai P.S.S. (born 1 January 1962) is a Congolese Catholic prelate who serves as Bishop of the Roman Catholic Diocese of Kikwit, in the Democratic Republic of the Congo, since 19 November 2016. Before that, from 2 February 2012 until 19 November 2016, he was Auxiliary Bishop of the Roman Catholic Archdiocese of Kinshasa. He was appointed bishop on 2 February 2012 by Pope Benedict XVI. He was consecrated and installed at Kinshasa, on 15 April 2012. He served as Titular Bishop of Naiera concurrently while auxiliary bishop. On 19 November 2016, The Holy Father, Pope Francis, transferred him to the Diocese of Kikwit as the Local Ordinary. He was installed at Kikwit on 4 December 2016. He is a member of the Society of Priests of Saint Sulpice.

== Background and education ==
Timothée Bodika Mansiyai was born on 1 January 1962 at Kinshasa, Archdiocese of Kinshasa, in the Democratic Republic of the Congo. He attended elementary school in his home area. He studied at the Pious XII Jesuit College in N'Djili, Kinshasa, for his secondary education. He studied philosophy at Saint André Kaggwa Major Seminary in Kinshasa. He then transferred to the Jean Paul I University Seminary, where he studied theology. He graduated with a Licentiate from there. He studied at the Catholic University of Toulouse, in France from 2001 until 2007, graduating with a doctorate in moral theology.

== Priest ==
He was ordained a priest of the Roman Catholic Archdiocese of Kinshasa on 1 August 1990 by the hands of Bishop Eugène Moke Motsüri, Titular Bishop of Lestrona. He made his perpetual vows as a member of the Society of Priests of Saint Sulpice in 1993. He served as priest until 2 February 2012.

As a priest, he served in various roles and locations, including:

- Pastor at St Cyprien Parish from 1990 until 1991.
- Treasurer and Professor of Moral Theology at the Jean XXIII Major Seminary from 1990 until 1992.
- Solitude sulpicienne Formation in Lyon, France from 1992 until 1993.
- Spiritual Director and Professor at the Jean XXIII Major Seminary from 1993 until 2001.
- Chaplain of a leprosy hospital in Kinshasa from 1993 until 2001.
- Initiator of the cultural and spiritual project for peace in the DRC (CRI du Congo) in 2000.
- Teacher at the Regional Seminary in Toulouse, France from 2001 until 2005.
- Studies leading to a doctorate in Moral Theology at the Catholic University of Toulouse, France from 2001 until 2007.
- Rector of the Saint André Kaggwa Seminary from 2007 until 2012.
- Professor of Philosophy and Moral Theology at the Saint André Kaggwa Seminary from 2007 until 2012.
- General Counselor of the Society of Sulpician Fathers from 2007 until 2012.

== As bishop ==
On 2 February 2012, Pope Benedict XVI appointed Reverend Father Timothée Bodika Mansiyai, Rector of the Seminary of Philosophy in Kinshasa and General Counselor of the Society of Sulpician Fathers, as Auxiliary Bishop of Kinshasa and concurrently as Titular Bishop of Naiera. He was consecrated and installed at Kinshasa, on 15 April 2012. The Principal Consecrator was Cardinal Laurent Monsengwo Pasinya, Archbishop of Kinshasa assisted by Bishop José Moko Ekanga, Bishop of Idiofa and Bishop Philippe Nkiere Keana, Bishop of Inongo.

On 19 November 2016, Pope Francis appointed him Bishop of the Diocese of Kikwit in the Metropolitan Ecclesiastical Province of Kinshasa. He was installed at Kikwit on 4 December 2016.

== See also ==
- Catholic Church in the Democratic Republic of the Congo

== Succession table ==
Catholic Church titles
Preceded by	Auxiliary Bishop of Kinshasa (2 February 2012 - 19 November 2016)	Succeeded by
Preceded by Marie-Edouard Mununu Kasiala (10 March 1986 - 19 November 2016)	Bishop of Kikwit (since 19 November 2016)	Succeeded by Incumbent
