= Luis Sáinz Hinojosa =

Bolivian prelate of the Catholic Church (1936–2022)

The Most Reverend Luis Sáinz Hinojosa
- Auxiliary Bishop Emeritus of Cochabamba
- Appointed: 12 September 2001
- Term ended: 29 August 2012
- Other post: Titular Archbishop of Iunca in Mauretania (2001–2022)
- Previous posts: Auxiliary Bishop of Cochabamba and Titular Bishop of Thucca Terebenthina (1982–1987); Archbishop of La Paz (1987–1996)

Orders
- Ordination: 26 August 1962
- Consecration: 31 July 1982 by Alfio Rapisarda

Personal details
- Born: 21 June 1936 Tiquipaya, Bolivia
- Died: 8 October 2022 (aged 86)

Luis Sáinz Hinojosa (21 June 1936 – 8 October 2022) was a Bolivian prelate of the Catholic Church.

Luis Sáinz Hinojosa was born on 21 June 1936 in Tiquipaya, Bolivia. He joined the Franciscans on 17 January 1961 and was ordained a priest on 26 August 1962.

On 8 May 1982, Pope John Paul II appointed him auxiliary bishop of Cochabamba and titular bishop of Thucca Terebenthina. He received his episcopal consecration on 31 July 1982 from the Apostolic Nuncio in Bolivia, Alfio Rapisarda, with Gennaro Maria Prata Vuolo, Archbishop of Cochabamba, and Luis Aníbal Rodríguez Pardo, Archbishop of Santa Cruz de la Sierra as co-consecrators.

On 24 February 1987, he was appointed Archbishop of La Paz and was installed there on 19 April. He resigned from that office on 1 August 1996 and then continued pastoral work, first in a village and then in Quillacollo.

On 12 September 2001 he was appointed auxiliary bishop of Cochabamba and titular archbishop of Iunca in Mauretania.

Pope Benedict XVI accepted his resignation for reasons of age on 29 August 2012.

Catholic Church titles
Preceded by —	Auxiliary Bishop of Cochabamba; 1982–1987, 2001–2012	Succeeded by —
Preceded by Darío de Jesús Monsalve Mejía	Titular Archbishop of Iunca in Mauretania; 2001–2022	Succeeded by Vacant
Preceded by Jorge Manrique Hurtado	Archbishop of La Paz; 1987–1996	Succeeded by Edmundo Luis Flavio Abastoflor Montero
Preceded by Pío Bello Ricardo	Titular Bishop of Thucca Terebenthina; 1982–1987	Succeeded by Anton Žerdín Bukovec
