= Víctor de la Peña Pérez =

Spanish Catholic bishop (1933–2015)

Víctor de la Peña Pérez O.F.M.
- Vicar Apostolic of Requena
- Church: Catholic Church
- See: Apostolic Vicariate of Requena
- In office: 15 May 1987 – 30 July 2005
- Predecessor: Odorico Leovigildo Saiz Pérez
- Successor: Juan Tomás Oliver Climent
- Other post: Titular Bishop of Avitta Bibba (1982-2015)
- Previous post: Auxiliary Bishop of Requena (1982-1987)

Orders
- Ordination: 3 July 1959
- Consecration: 3 July 1983 by Mario Tagliaferri

Personal details
- Born: 14 September 1933 Villaldemiro, Province of Burgos, Spanish Republic
- Died: 1 July 2015 (aged 81)
- Coat of arms

Victor de la Peña Pérez (14 September 1933 – 1 July 2015), was a bishop of the Roman Catholic Church.

He was born 14 September 1933 in Villaldemiro, Spain and was ordained a priest of Order of Friars Minor on 3 July 1959. On 3 July 1983 he was made auxiliary bishop of Requena (Peru) and titular bishop of Avitta Bibba.

On 15 May 1987 he was appointed Vicar Apostolic of Requena, Peru and he resigned this position on 30 July 2005, just short of his 71st birthday.
