= André Lefebvre (bishop) =

Belgian Catholic bishop (1902–1991)

André Lefebvre S.J.
- Bishop of Kikwit
- Church: Catholic Church
- Diocese: Diocese of Kikwit
- In office: 25 February 1955 – 29 November 1967
- Predecessor: Henri Van Schingen
- Successor: Alexander Mbuka-Nzundu
- Other post: Titular Bishop of Thucca Terenbenthina (1967-1976)
- Previous post: Titular Bishop of Raphanea (1955-1959)

Orders
- Ordination: 24 August 1934
- Consecration: 22 May 1955 by Alfredo Bruniera

Personal details
- Born: 26 January 1902 Tournai, Hainaut Province, Belgium
- Died: 15 May 1991 (aged 89)

André Lefèbvre (26 January 1902, Belgium – 15 May 1991) was a Roman Catholic bishop.

He was vicar apostolic (1955) and then bishop of the Roman Catholic Diocese of Kikwit (1959–1967), and titular bishop of Raphanea (1955) and then the Diocese of Thucca Terenbenthina (1967–1976).
