= Moronta (surname) =

Moronta is a surname. Notable people with the surname include:

- María Moronta (born 1996), Dominican boxer
- Mario Moronta (1949–2025), Venezuelan bishop
- Reyes Moronta (1993–2024), Dominican baseball player
