= Diocese of Kikwit =

Catholic diocese in the Democratic Republic of the Congo

Diocese of Kikwit Dioecesis Kikuitensis

Location
- Country: Democratic Republic of the Congo
- Ecclesiastical province: Kinshasa

Statistics
- Area: 62,000 km^{2} (24,000 sq mi)
- Population: Total; Catholics: (as of 2004); 3,809,220; 2,004,852 (52.6%)

Information
- Denomination: Catholic Church
- Sui iuris church: Latin Church
- Rite: Roman Rite

Current leadership
- Pope: Leo XIV
- Bishop: Timothée Bodika Mansiyai, P.S.S.

Website
- https://diocesedekikwit.org/

The Diocese of Kikwit (Latin: Kikuiten(sis)) is a Latin Church diocese of the Catholic Church located in the city of Kikwit in the ecclesiastical province of Kinshasa in the Democratic Republic of the Congo.

== History ==
- Established 18 April 1893 as Mission sui iuris of Kwango (or Koango), on territory split off from the then Apostolic Vicariate of Léopoldville
- Promoted on 31 January 1903 as Apostolic Prefecture of Kwango
- Gained territory in March 1921 from the Apostolic Vicariate of Upper Kasai
- Promoted on 28 March 1928 to Apostolic Vicariate of Kwango, hence entitled to a titular bishop
- Lost territory repeatedly:
  - On 1 April 1931 to establish the Apostolic Vicariate of Kisantu,
  - On 28 January 1935 to the same;
  - On 13 April 1937 to establish the Apostolic Prefecture of Ipamu
  - On 25 April 1939 to the same.
  - On 24 May 1950: to the Apostolic Vicariate of Léopoldville
- Renamed on 21 February 1955 as the Apostolic Vicariate of Kikwit
- Lost territory on 5 July 1957 to establish the Apostolic Prefecture of Kenge
- Promoted on 10 November 1959 as Diocese of Kikwit

== Bishops ==
=== Ordinaries ===
Ecclesiastical superiors of the mission sui iuris of Kwango (Koango)

(not available -- 1893-1903)

Apostolic Prefects of Kwango

- Julien Banckaert (1903 – 1911)
- Stanislas de Vos, Society of Jesus (S.J.) (1911 – 1928)

Apostolic Vicars of Kwango

- Silvain van Hee, S.J. (28 March 1928 – 20 February 1936), Titular Bishop of Possala (28 March 1928 – 26 March 1960)
- Enrico van Schingen, S.J. (17 December 1936 – 2 July 1954), Titular Bishop of Phelbes (17 December 1936 – 2 July 1954)

Apostolic Vicar of Kikwit

- André Lefèbvre, S.J. (25 February 1955 – 10 November 1959 see below), Titular Bishop of Raphanea (25 February 1955 – 10 November 1959)

Bishops of Kikwit

- André Lefèbvre, S.J. (see above 10 November 1959 – 29 November 1967), later Titular Bishop of Thucca Terebenthina (29 November 1967 – 15 September 1976)
- Alexander Mbuka-Nzundu (29 November 1967 – 14 October 1985), previously Titular Bishop of Cataquas & Auxiliary Bishop of Kikwit (24 June 1961 – 29 November 1967)
- Édouard Mununu Kasiala, O.C.S.O. (10 March 1986 – 19 November 2016), also Apostolic Administrator of Popokabaka (Congo-Kinshasa) (1991 – 22 April 1996); previously Titular Bishop of Aquæ Flaviæ & Auxiliary Bishop of Kikwit (8 November 1984 – 10 March 1986)
- Timothée Bodika Mansiyai, P.S.S. (since 19 November 2016)

=== Coadjutor vicars apostolic ===
- Charles Dauvin, S.J. (1948), died without being consecrated
- Joseph Guffens, S.J. (1949-1954)

=== Auxiliary bishops ===
- Alexander Mbuka-Nzundu (1961-1967), appointed Bishop here
- Marie-Édouard Mununu, O.C.S.O. (1984-1986), appointed Bishop here

== See also ==
- Roman Catholicism in the Democratic Republic of the Congo

== Sources and external links ==
- GCatholic.org, with incumbent biography links
- Catholic Hierarchy
