= Diocese of Idiofa =

Roman Catholic diocese in the Democratic Republic of the Congo

Coordinates: 4.9656°S 19.5912°E

Diocese of Idiofa Dioecesis Idiofaensis

Location
- Country: Democratic Republic of the Congo
- Metropolitan: Kinshasa

Statistics
- Area: 60,000 km^{2} (23,000 sq mi)
- Population: Total; Catholics: (as of 2004); 2,200,000; 1,100,000 (50.0%)

Information
- Rite: Latin Rite

Current leadership
- Pope: Leo XIV
- Bishop: José Moko Ekanga, P.S.S.
- Bishops emeritus: Louis Mbwôl-Mpasi, O.M.I.

The Roman Catholic Diocese of Idiofa (Latin: Idiofaën(sis)) is a diocese located in the city of Idiofa in the ecclesiastical province of Kinshasa in the Democratic Republic of the Congo.

== History ==
- 13 April 1937: Established as Apostolic Prefecture of Ipamu from the Apostolic Vicariate of Upper Kasai and Apostolic Vicariate of Koango
- 12 February 1948: Promoted as Apostolic Vicariate of Ipamu
- 10 November 1959: Promoted as Diocese of Ipamu
- 20 June 1960: Renamed as Diocese of Idiofa

== Leadership, in reverse chronological order ==
- Bishops of Idiofa (Roman rite), below
  - Bishop José Moko Ekanga, P.S.S. (26 May 2009 – present )
  - Apostolic Administrator Bishop Louis Nzala Kianza (31 May 2006 – 26 May 2009)
  - Bishop Louis Mbwôl-Mpasi, O.M.I. (20 May 1997 – 31 May 2006)
  - Bishop Eugène Biletsi Onim (21 May 1970 – 4 November 1994)
  - Bishop René Toussaint, O.M.I. (20 June 1960 – 21 May 1970); see below
- Bishop of Ipamu (Roman rite), below
  - Bishop René Toussaint, O.M.I. (10 November 1959 – 20 June 1960); see above & below
- Vicars Apostolic of Ipamu (Roman rite), below
  - Bishop René Toussaint, O.M.I. (16 January 1958 – 10 November 1959); see above
  - Bishop Alfonso Bossart, O.M.I. (12 February 1948 – May 1957); see below
- Prefect Apostolic of Ipamu (Roman rite)
  - Father Alfonso Bossart, O.M.I. (11 June 1937 – 12 February 1948); see above

== See also ==
- Roman Catholicism in the Democratic Republic of the Congo
