= Ovidio Pérez Morales =

Venezuelan Roman Catholic archbishop (born 1932)

Most Reverend Ovidio Pérez Morales
- Archbishop-Bishop Emeritus of Los Teques
- Church: Catholic Church
- Archdiocese: Coro
- Diocese: Los Teques
- Installed: 5 June 1999
- Term ended: 30 December 2004
- Predecessor: Mario Moronta
- Successor: Freddy Jesús Fuenmayor Suárez
- Other post: President of the Episcopal Conference of Venezuela (1990–1996)
- Previous posts: Auxiliary Bishop of Caracas (1970–1980); Titular Bishop of Aquae Albae in Byzacena (1970–1980); Bishop of Coro (1980–1992); Archbishop of Maracaibo (1992–1999)

Orders
- Ordination: 26 October 1958
- Consecration: 19 March 1971 by José Humberto Quintero Parra

Personal details
- Born: Ramón Ovidio Pérez Morales; 26 June 1932 (age 94) Pregonero, Táchira, Venezuela
- Motto: Para que todos sean uno

Ramón Ovidio Pérez Morales (Note: In this Hispanic American name, the first or paternal surname is Pérez and the second or maternal family name is Morales.) (born 26 June 1932) is a Venezuelan Roman Catholic prelate, who held several high-ranking ecclesiastical positions, serving as Auxiliary Bishop of Caracas, Bishop of Coro, Archbishop of Maracaibo, and Archbishop-Bishop of Los Teques. He also served as the President of the Episcopal Conference of Venezuela (CEV) from 1990 to 1996.

Widely regarded as a pioneer of "digital evangelization", he is known in Venezuela as the "tweeting bishop" for his active role in social media-based commentary regarding faith and the nation's political situation.

== Early life and priesthood ==
Pérez Morales was born in Pregonero, Táchira State, on 26 June 1932. He moved to Caracas for his secondary education, graduating with a bachelor's degree in Philosophy and Literature from the Liceo Andrés Bello. Following his graduation, he initially began studying law at the Central University of Venezuela (UCV) before discerning his vocation to the priesthood. He later moved to Rome to complete his ecclesiastical studies, where he was ordained a priest on 26 October 1958.

== Episcopal ministry ==
=== Auxiliary Bishop of Caracas ===
On 2 December 1970, he was appointed Auxiliary Bishop of the Archdiocese of Caracas and Titular Bishop of Aquae Albae in Byzacena. He was consecrated on 19 March 1971 by Cardinal José Humberto Quintero Parra.

=== Bishop of Coro and Archbishop of Maracaibo ===
Pérez Morales was named Bishop of the Diocese of Coro on 20 May 1980. On 23 December 1992, he was promoted to Archbishop of Maracaibo, where he served for seven years during a transformative period for the Church in western Venezuela. During this time he also served as the President of the Episcopal Conference of Venezuela (CEV) from 1990 to 1996.

=== Archbishop-Bishop of Los Teques ===
Shortly after, on 5 June 1999, he was transferred to the Diocese of Los Teques with title of Archbishop ad personam. He served there until his retirement was accepted on 30 December 2004.

== Public influence and retirement ==
Even in retirement, Pérez Morales remains a significant moral voice. In January 2026, he noted the spiritual and civil weight of the Divina Pastora procession as a symbol of hope for the Venezuelan people during difficult political times.
