= Piotr Krupa =

Polish Roman Catholic prelate (1936–2024)

- Auxiliary Bishop Emeritus of Pelplin
- Appointed: 18 February 1984
- Term ended: 15 September 2011
- Other post: Titular Bishop of Aquae Albae in Byzacena (1984–2024)
- Previous post: Auxiliary Bishop of Koszalin-Kołobrzeg (1984–1992)

Orders
- Ordination: 14 May 1961 by Wilhelm Pluta
- Consecration: 15 April 1984 by Józef Glemp

Personal details
- Born: 19 June 1936 Braciejowa, Second Polish Republic
- Died: 4 March 2024 (aged 87) Tczew, Poland
- Motto: Adveniat Regnum Tuum; (May Your Kingdom Come)

Styles of Piotr Krupa
- Reference style: His Excellency; The Most Reverend
- Spoken style: Your Excellency
- Religious style: Bishop

Piotr Krupa (19 June 1936 – 4 March 2024) was a Polish prelate of the Catholic Church. He served as auxiliary bishop of Koszalin-Kołobrzeg from 1984 to 1992 and as auxiliary bishop of Pelplin from 1992 to 2011. He was also the titular bishop of Aquae Albae in Byzacena until his death.

== Biography ==
Piotr Krupa was born on 19 June 1936 in Braciejowa. In the years 1951–1955 he studied at the Secondary School in Złotów, where he obtained his secondary school leaving certificate. In the years 1955–1961 he completed philosophical and theological studies at the Major Seminary in Gościkowo-Paradyż. He was ordained a priest on 14 May 1961 in Gorzów Wielkopolski by Bishop Wilhelm Pluta, the local delegate of the Primate of Poland with the rights of a residential bishop. He continued his studies in moral theology in the years 1971–1976 at the Faculty of Catholic Theology of the Université des Sciences Humaines in Strasbourg. There, in 1972 he received a master's degree, in 1973 a bachelor's degree, and in 1975, on the basis of the dissertation Moral attitudes in extreme situations, a doctorate in moral theology. In 1980–1981, at the University of Strasbourg, he completed studies preparing for habilitation, obtaining the Diplôme d'Etudes Approfondies.

Krupa worked as a vicar in the following parishes: St. Trinity Church in Gubin (1961–1962), St. Michael the Archangel in Świebodzin (1962–1966), Christ the King in Kołczygłowy (1966–1970) and the Holy Savior in Zielona Góra (1970–1971). In 1972, as a result of changes in the organization of church structures in Poland, he was incardinated into the newly established Koszalin-Kołobrzeg diocese. In the years 1976–1978 he served as a notary in the Koszalin curia. In 1981, he was appointed vicar general of the diocese and director of the department of Catholic science. In 1979, he received the dignity of canon-theologian of the Koszalin cathedral chapter.

Krupa lectured on moral theology at the Major Seminary of the Diocese of Gorzów in Gościków-Paradyż (1976–1980) and at the Major Seminary in Koszalin (1981–1993). In the years 1978–1980 he held the office of rector of the Major Seminary of the Diocese of Gorzów in Gościków-Paradyż, and in the years 1981–1986 of the newly established Major Seminary in Koszalin (until 1982 based in Złocieniec). As an auxiliary bishop of Pelplin, he lectured in detailed moral theology at the Major Seminary in Pelplin and became the director of the Diocesan Theological College in Tczew.

On 18 February 1984, he was appointed auxiliary bishop of the Koszalin-Kołobrzeg diocese with the titular see of Aquae Albae in Byzacena. He was ordained a bishop on 15 April 1984 in the co-cathedral of the Assumption of the Blessed Virgin Mary in Kołobrzeg. They were given to him by Cardinal Józef Glemp, Primate of Poland, assisted by Jerzy Stroba, Metropolitan Archbishop of Poznań, and Ignacy Jeż, diocesan bishop of Koszalin-Kołobrzeg[1]. He adopted the words "Adveniat Regnum Tuum" (Thy Kingdom Come) as his episcopal motto. He held the office of vicar general in the diocese. In the diocesan curia, he served as chairman of the catechetical department and the department of Catholic science. He also belonged to the priestly council and the pastoral council.

On 25 March 1992, in connection with the reorganization of the structures of the Catholic Church in Poland, he was appointed auxiliary bishop of the Pelplin diocese. He took over the office of vicar general of the diocese. He became the chairman of the synodal teams of the diocese. He became a member of the priestly council, the college of consultors and the pastoral council. He became the editor of the "Monthly Journal of the Pelplin Diocese". In 1992, he was appointed provost of the cathedral chapter in Pelplin. On 15 September 2011, Pope Benedict XVI accepted his resignation from the duties of auxiliary bishop of Pelplin.

As part of the work of the Polish Episcopate, he became a member of the Commission for Sacred Construction, the Commission for Consecrated Life and the Working Group for Pastoral Contacts with the French Episcopate.

Krupa died at a hospital in Tczew, on 4 March 2024, at the age of 87. On 9 March, he was buried in the crypt of the Cathedral Basilica of the Assumption of the Blessed Virgin Mary in Pelplin.

== Honours ==
In 2021, he was granted honorary citizenship of the Gmina Zakrzewo commune (2021).

Catholic Church titles
Preceded by —	Auxiliary Bishop of Koszalin-Kołobrzeg; 1984–1992	Succeeded by —
Preceded by —	Auxiliary Bishop of Pelplin; 1992–2011	Succeeded by —
Preceded by Anthony Bevilacqua	Titular Bishop of Aquae Albae in Byzacena; 1984–2024	Succeeded by Vacant
