= Aquae in Numidia =

Aquae in Numidia is a former Roman city and bishopric and present Latin Catholic titular see in present Algeria.

== History ==
In Antiquity, the city (situated near modern Henchir-El-Hamman) was important enough in the Roman province of Numidia to become a suffragan bishopric, but later faded.

== Titular see ==
The diocese was nominally restored in 1933 and has had the following incumbents, both of the lowest (episcopal) and intermediary (archiepiscopal) ranks :

- Titular Archbishop Félix Scalais, Scheutists C.I.C.M. (1964.07.07 – 1967.08.17)
- Titular Bishop Francis James Harrison (1971.03.01 – 1976.11.09)
- Titular Bishop Patrick Laurence Murphy (1976.12.20 – 1986.04.08)
- Titular Bishop Juan Luis Martin Buisson, P.M.E. (1986.04.18 – ...), Apostolic Vicar emeritus of Pucallpa.

== See also ==
- Catholic Church in Algeria
