= André Mayamba Mabuti Kathongo =

André Mayamba Mabuti Kathongo (1931 – 12 April 2016) was a Democratic Republic of the Congo, Roman Catholic bishop.

Ordained to the priesthood in 1958, Mayamba Mabuti Kathongo served as bishop of the Roman Catholic Diocese of Popokabaka, Democratic Republic of the Congo from 1979 until 1993.
