= Apostolic Vicariate of Pucallpa =

Latin Catholic ecclesiastical jurisdiction in Peru

Apostolic Vicariate of Pucallpa Apostolicus Vicariatus Pucallpaënsis

Location
- Country: Peru
- Metropolitan: Immediately exempt to the Holy See

Statistics
- Area: 52,168 km^{2} (20,142 sq mi)
- Population: Total; Catholics: 538,000 (2010); 431,000 (2010)

Information
- Denomination: Catholic Church
- Sui iuris church: Latin Church
- Rite: Roman Rite

Current leadership
- Vicar Apostolic: Augusto Martín Quijano Rodríguez, S.D.B.
- Bishops emeritus: Juan Luis Martin Buisson, P.M.E. Gaetano Galbusera Fumagalli, S.D.B.

The Apostolic Vicariate of Pucallpa (Latin: Apostolicus Vicariatus Pucallpaënsis) is a Latin Church Apostolic vicariate of the Catholic Church in Peru. It is immediately exempt to the Holy See and not part of any ecclesiastical province.

Its cathedral is Catedral de la Inmaculada Concepción (dedicated to the Immaculate Conception), located in the episcopal see of Pucallpa in Coronel Portillo Province. It is the capital of that of the wider Ucayali region, in Peru's inland Amazon rainforest.

== History ==
- Established on March 2, 1956, as Apostolic Vicariate (a missionary pre-diocesan jurisdiction type, entitled to a titular bishop) of Pucallpa, on territory split off from the suppressed Vicariate Apostolic of Ucayali (along with two other vicariates: Apostolic Vicariate of San Ramon and Vicariate Apostolic of Requena).

== Ordinaries ==
Apostolic Vicars of Pucallpa

- Joseph Gustave Roland Prévost Godard, P.M.E. (November 11, 1956 – October 23, 1989), Titular Bishop of Ammædara (November 11, 1956 – November 13, 2005); previously Apostolic Prefect of Lindong 林東 (China) (November 28, 1946 – November 11, 1956)
- Juan Luis Martin Buisson, P.M.E. (October 23, 1989 – September 8, 2008), Titular Bishop of Aquæ in Numidia (April 18, 1986 – ...); succeeding as former Coadjutor Vicar Apostolic of Pucallpa (April 18, 1986 – October 23, 1989)
- Gaetano Galbusera Fumagalli, S.D.B. (September 8, 2008 – July 31, 2019), Titular Bishop of Mascula (July 18, 2007 – ...); succeeding as former Coadjutor Vicar Apostolic of Pucallpa (July 18, 2007 – September 8, 2008)

== See also ==
- Immaculate Conception Cathedral, Pucallpa
