= Odorico Leovigildo Saiz Pérez =

- Titular Bishop of Simingi
- Church: Roman Catholic Church
- See: Titular see of Simingi
- In office: 1973 – 2012
- Predecessor: Henry Joseph Kennedy
- Previous post(s): Apostolic vicariate of Requena; Bishop

Orders
- Ordination: 13 March 1937

Personal details
- Born: 6 February 1912; Revilla del Campo, Spain
- Died: 14 October 2012 (aged 100)

Odorico Leovigildo Saiz Pérez O.F.M. (6 February 1912 – 14 October 2012) was a Spanish Bishop of the Roman Catholic Church. At the age of 100, he was one of oldest bishop in the Church and the oldest Spanish bishop.

Saiz was born in Revilla del Campo, Spain, and ordained a priest on 13 March 1937 of the Order of Friar Minor. He was appointed Apostolic vicar of Requena, Peru on 26 November 1973 as well as Titular bishop of Simingi. Pérez retired as Apostolic vicariate of Requena, Peru on 15 May 1987.
