= Louis Mbwôl-Mpasi =

Congolese Roman Catholic bishop (born 1931)

His Excellency Louis Mbwôl-Mpasi O.M.I.
- Bishop Emeritus of Diocese of Idiofa
- Church: Catholic Church
- Diocese: Idiofa
- Appointed: 20 May 1997
- Term ended: 31 May 2006
- Predecessor: Eugène Biletsi Onim
- Successor: José Moko Ekanga
- Previous posts: Auxiliary Bishop of Isangi and Titular Bishop of Carcabia (1984–1988); Bishop of Isangi (1988–1997)

Orders
- Ordination: 26 January 1962
- Consecration: 25 November 1984 by Augustin Fataki Alueke

Personal details
- Born: 11 February 1931 (age 95) Ipamu, Kwilu Province, Belgian Congo
- Denomination: Roman Catholic

Louis Mbwôl-Mpasi, O.M.I. (born 11 February 1931) is a Congolese Roman Catholic prelate who served as bishop of the Roman Catholic Diocese of Idiofa from 1997 to 2006. He previously served as bishop of the Isangi from 1988 to 1997 and as auxiliary bishop of the same diocese from 1984 to 1988.

== Early life and priesthood ==
Louis Mbwôl-Mpasi was born on 11 February 1931 in Ipamu, Kwilu Province, in what was then the Belgian Congo. He joined the Missionary Oblates of Mary Immaculate, a Roman Catholic religious order, and was ordained a priest on 26 January 1962.

During his early priestly ministry he served as a parish vicar in several missions including Mapangu, Mikope, and Kimputu, and also taught at Mapangu. Between 1967 and 1969 he pursued further studies in Rome and Paris. After returning to Zaire (now the Democratic Republic of the Congo), he served as vicar and parish priest in Longwama and Ipamu from 1969 to 1977, and later became novice master of the Oblates in Ifwanzondo from 1977 to 1984.

== Episcopal ministry ==
On 4 June 1984, Pope John Paul II appointed Mbwôl-Mpasi auxiliary bishop of Isangi and titular bishop of Carcabia. He was consecrated a bishop on 25 November 1984 by Archbishop Augustin Fataki Alueke of Kisangani, with bishops Lodewijk Antoon Jansen and Eugène Biletsi Onim as co-consecrators.

He was appointed bishop of Isangi on 1 September 1988, succeeding Lodewijk Antoon Jansen. During his tenure there were internal tensions in the diocese reported in the 1990s.

He was appointed bishop of Idiofa on 20 May 1997.

On 31 May 2006, Pope Benedict XVI accepted his resignation from the pastoral governance of the Diocese of Idiofa upon reaching the canonical retirement age.
