= Apostolic Vicariate of Ucayali =

Former Latin Catholic jurisdiction in Peru

Apostolic Vicariate of Ucayali Apostolicus Vicariatus Ucayali

Location
- Country: Peru
- Ecclesiastical province: Exempt directly to the Holy See

Information
- Denomination: Catholic Church
- Sui iuris church: Latin Church
- Rite: Roman Rite

The Apostolic Vicariate of Ucayali (Latin: Apostolicus Vicariatus Ucayali) was a Latin Church ecclesiastical jurisdiction or apostolic vicariate of the Catholic Church in northeast Peru.

== History ==
The jurisdiction was established on February 5, 1900 as the Apostolic Prefecture of Ucayali, on territory split off from the Diocese of Ayacucho o Huamanga and Diocese of Huánuco. On July 14, 1925, it was promoted to as an apostolic vicariate and thus entitled to a titular bishop as its ordinary; the incumbent was elevated. The Apostolic Vicariate of Ucayali was suppressed on March 2, 1956 and its territory divided between three other new created apostolic vicariates: the Apostolic Vicariate of San Ramon, the Apostolic Vicariate of Requena and the Apostolic Vicariate of Pucallpa.

== Incumbent ordinaries ==
all incumbents were members of the Friars Minor (Franciscans, O.F.M.)
Apostolic Prefects of Ucayali

- Friar Augustin Alemany, O.F.M. (February 14, 1905 – September 1905)
- Friar Bernardo Irastorza, O.F.M. (September 1905 – 1912)
- Friar Francisco Miguel Irazola y Galarza, O.F.M. (January 28, 1913 – July 14, 1925 see below)

Apostolic Vicars of Ucayali

- Bishop Francisco Miguel Irazola y Galarza, O.F.M., Titular Bishop of Flavias (see above July 14, 1925 – 1939)
- Bishop León Bonaventura de Uriarte Bengoa, O.F.M., Titular Bishop of Madaurus (July 10, 1940 – March 2, 1956) (later Apostolic Vicar of San Ramon)
