= Iunca in Mauretania =

Roman Empire - Mauretania Caesariensis (125 AD)

The Diocese of Iunca in Mauretania is a suppressed residential see and current titular see of the Roman Catholic Church.

The bishopric was centered on an ancient Roman town, now lost to history, that was located in the Roman province of Mauretania Caesariensis, in today's Algeria. The ancient town flourished in late antiquity but did not last long after the Muslim conquest of the Maghreb. Today the bishopric survives only as a titular archbishopric and the archbishop until his death was Luis Sáinz Hinojosa.
