= St. Philip Neri Cathedral, Los Teques =

St. Philip Neri Cathedral
- Catedral de San Felipe Neri
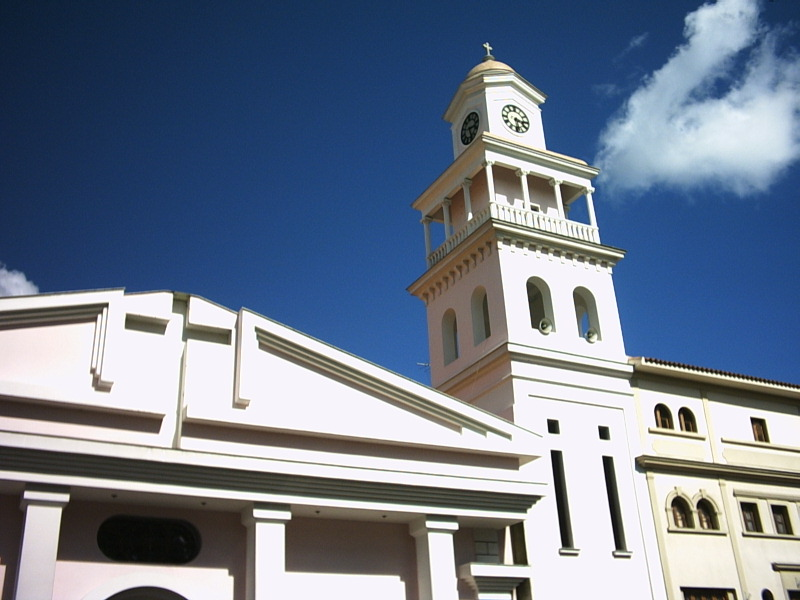
- St. Philip Neri Cathedral
- Location: Los Teques
- Country: Venezuela
- Denomination: Roman Catholic Church

The St. Philip Neri Cathedral (Spanish: Catedral de San Felipe Neri) Also Los Teques Cathedral It is the main cathedral of the Catholic Church and headquarters of the Diocese of Los Teques. The cathedral is located at the historic center of the city of Los Teques in the Municipality Guaicaipuro, Miranda state in Venezuela, specifically in front of the renowned Plaza Bolivar in Los Teques.

In the eighteenth century it was established as a modest oratory. It was in this place that the first pastor, Manuel Antonio Fernandez Feo, celebrated the first Mass on 17 September 1778. The first church opened solemnly on May 31, 1790.

== See also ==
- List of cathedrals in Venezuela
- Roman Catholicism in Venezuela
- St. Philip Neri
