= Thucca terebenthina =

Thucca Terebenthina is a titular see of the Roman Catholic Church, in Tunisia.

The cathedra of the diocese was in a now lost Roman town located in the Roman province of Byzacena and Africa proconsularis in what is today the Sahel region of Northern Tunisia. The current bishop is Anton Žerdín Bukovec of Peru, who replaced Luis Sáinz Hinojosa.
