= Apostolic Vicariate of Requena =

Latin Catholic ecclesiastical jurisdiction in Peru

Apostolic Vicariate of Requena Apostolicus Vicariatus Requenaënsis

Location
- Country: Peru
- Metropolitan: Immediately exempt to the Holy See

Statistics
- Area: 82,000 km^{2} (32,000 sq mi)
- Population: Total; Catholics: (as of 2022); 166,000; 146,000 (88.0%)
- Parishes: 8

Information
- Denomination: Catholic Church
- Sui iuris church: Latin Church
- Rite: Roman Rite
- Established: 2 March 1956; 70 years ago
- Secular priests: 7 (2 Diocesan, 5 Religious Orders)

Current leadership
- Pope: Leo XIV
- Vicar Apostolic: Alejandro Adolfo Wiesse León, O.F.M.
- Bishops emeritus: Juan Tomás Oliver Climent, O.F.M.

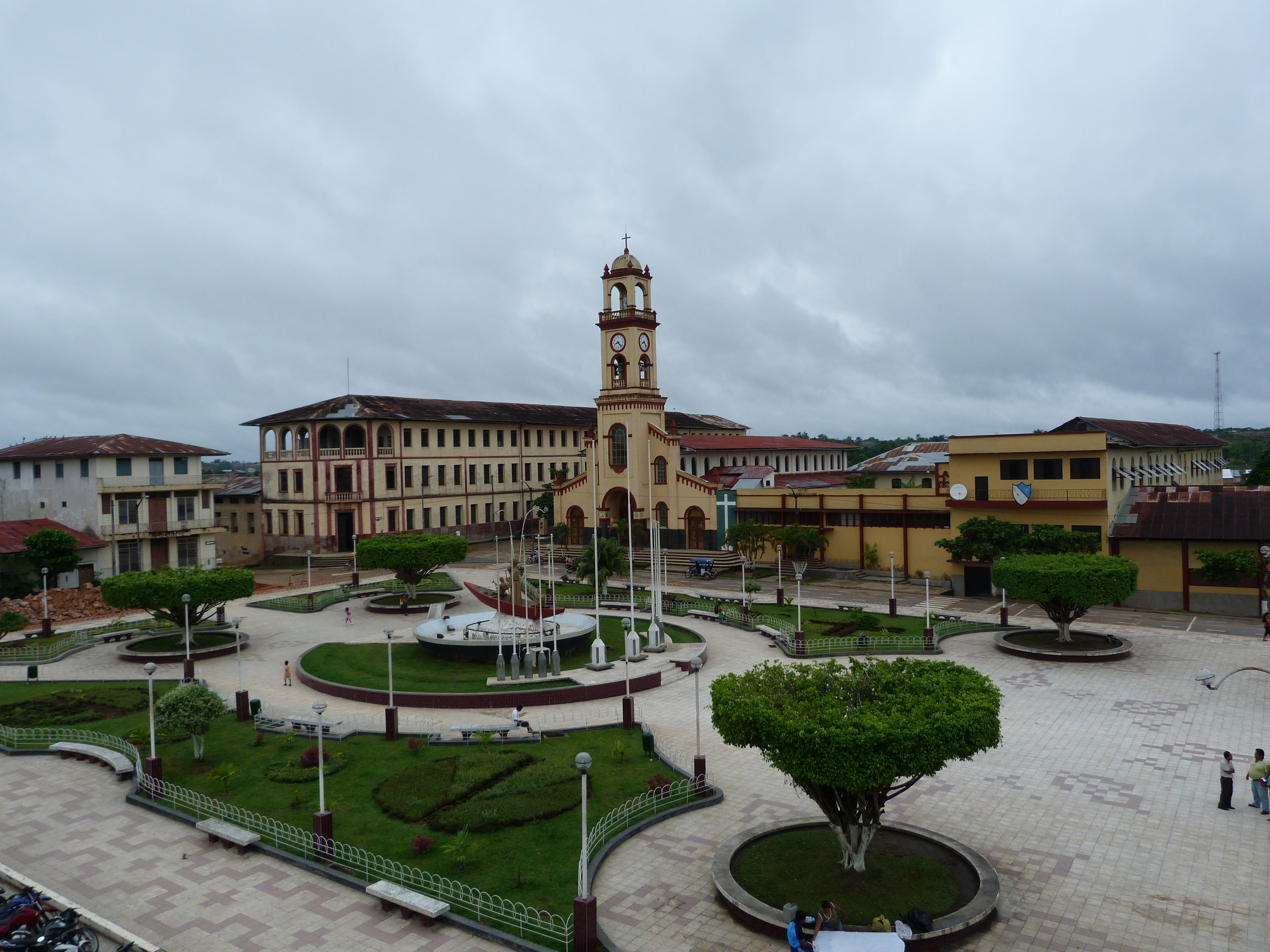
Requena, Loreto

The Apostolic Vicariate of Requena (Latin: Vicariatus Apostolicus Requenaënsis) is a Latin Church apostolic vicariate of the Catholic Church located in the episcopal see of Requena in Peru.

== History ==
- 2 March 1956: Established as Apostolic Vicariate of Requena from the suppressed Vicariate Apostolic of Ucayali (along with two other vicariates: Vicariate Apostolic of Pucallpa and Vicariate Apostolic of San Ramon).

== Bishops ==
Vicars Apostolic of Requena, in reverse chronological order

- Alejandro Adolfo Wiesse León, O.F.M. (4 Jun 2022 – Present)
- Juan Tomás Oliver Climent, O.F.M. (30 Jul 2005 – 4 Jun 2022), resigned
- Victor de la Peña Pérez, O.F.M. (15 May 1987 – 30 Jul 2005), resigned
- Odorico Leovigildo Sáiz Pérez, O.F.M. (26 Nov 1973 – 15 May 1987), retired
- Valeriano Ludovico Arroyo Paniego, O.F.M. (26 Jan 1957 – 26 Nov 1973), retired

Coadjutor vicar apostolic

- Juan Tomás Oliver Climent, O.F.M. (2004-2005)

Auxiliary bishop

- Victor de la Peña Pérez, O.F.M. (1982-1987), appointed Vicar Apostolic here
