= Marie-Édouard Mununu =

Congolese Roman Catholic prelate (1936–2022)

Monsignor Marie-Édouard Mununu
- Bishop Emeritus of Kikwit
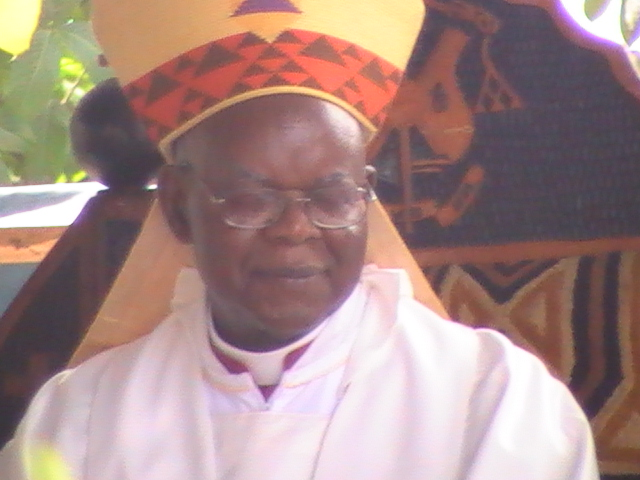
- Mununu in 2010
- Church: Catholic Church
- Archdiocese: Roman Catholic Archdiocese of Kinshasa
- Diocese: Roman Catholic Diocese of Kikwit
- Installed: 10 March 1986
- Term ended: 19 November 2016
- Predecessor: Alexander Mbuka-Nzundu
- Successor: Timothée Bodika Mansiyai
- Previous posts: Titular Bishop of Aquae Flaviae and Auxiliary Bishop of Kikwit (1984–1986)

Orders
- Ordination: 20 August 1967
- Consecration: 24 March 1985 by Alexander Mbuka-Nzundu

Personal details
- Born: Marie-Édouard Mununu-Kasiala; 15 August 1936 Buganda-Pindi, Belgian Congo
- Died: 5 December 2022 (aged 86) Brussels, Belgium
- Education: Notre Dame of Emmanual Monastery of Kasanza

Marie-Édouard Mununu-Kasiala (15 August 1936 – 5 December 2022) was a Congolese Roman Catholic prelate and Trappist monk. Prior of the Notre Dame of Emmanual Monastery of Kasanza in 1975, he was auxiliary bishop of Roman Catholic Diocese of Kikwit from 1985 to 1986 and subsequently bishop of Kikwit from 1986 to 2016.

== Biography ==
Mununu was one of the first Trappist monks in the Democratic Republic of the Congo. He entered the Monastère Notre-Dame de l'Emmanuel de Kasanza upon its foundation in 1958. On 20 August 1967, he was ordained a priest, the first Trappist priest in the country. In December 1975, he was elected Prior of the monastery.

On 8 November 1984, Pope John Paul II appointed him Auxiliary Bishop of Kikwit. On 24 March 1985, he was consecrated Bishop of Kikwit by his predecessor, Alexander Mbuka-Nzundu. On 19 November 2016, he retired from this position after more than 30 years in the role.

Marie-Édouard Mununu died in Brussels on 5 December 2022, at the age of 86.

Catholic Church titles
Preceded by Alexander Mbuka-Nzundu	Bishop of Kikwit; 1986–2016	Succeeded by Timothée Bodika Mansiyai
Preceded by —	Auxiliary Bishop of Kikwit; 1984–1986	Succeeded by —
Preceded by Stephen Naidoo	Titular Bishop of Aquae Flaviae; 1984–1986	Succeeded by Luis Augusto Castro Quiroga
