= Pío Bello Ricardo =

Pío Bello Ricardo SJ
- Bishop of Los Teques
- Church: Catholic Church
- Diocese: Diocese of Los Teques
- In office: 31 January 1981 – 2 December 1995
- Predecessor: Juan José Bernal Ortiz
- Successor: Mario Moronta
- Previous posts: Titular Bishop of Thucca Terenbenthina (1977-1981); Auxiliary Bishop of Los Teques (1977-1981)

Orders
- Ordination: 30 July 1951
- Consecration: 10 July 1977 by José Humberto Quintero Parra

Personal details
- Born: 5 May 1921 Guarenas, Miranda, United States of Venezuela
- Died: 27 July 2003 (aged 82)

Bishop Pío Bello Ricardo, SJ (Born 5 May 1921 (Venezuela), died 27 July 2003) was Titular Bishop of Thucca terebenthina and Auxiliary Bishop of Roman Catholic Diocese of Los Teques from 1977 to 1981, then Bishop of that diocese from 1981 to 1995.

== Life ==
Pío Bello Ricardo joined the Jesuit order and was ordained a priest on July 30, 1951.

Paul VI. appointed him on May 23, 1977 Auxiliary Bishop in Los Teques and Titular Bishop of Thucca Terebenthina. The Archbishop of Caracas, Santiago de Venezuela, José Humberto Cardinal Quintero Parra, consecrated him bishop on 10 July of the same year; Co-consecrators were Giovanni Mariani, Apostolic Nuncio to Venezuela, and Juan José Bernal Ortiz, Archbishop ad personam of Los Teques.

The Pope appointed him on January 31, 1981 Bishop of Los Teques. On 2 December 1995 John Paul II accepted his age-related resignation.
