= Immaculate Conception Cathedral, Pucallpa =

Coordinates: 8.3838°S 74.5331°W

Immaculate Conception Cathedral
- Catedral de la Inmaculada Concepción
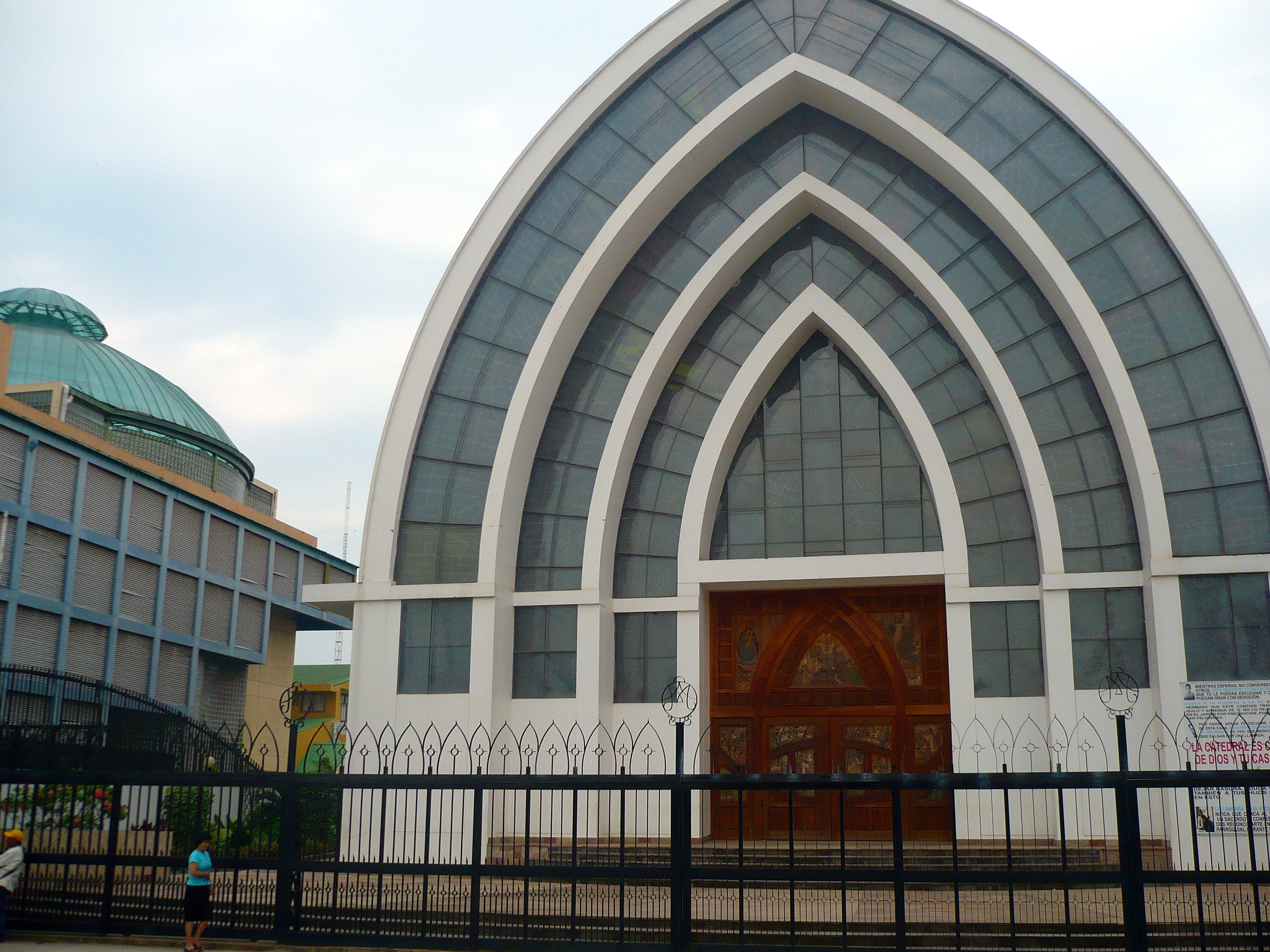
- Immaculate Conception Cathedral
- Location: Pucallpa
- Country: Peru
- Denomination: Roman Catholic Church

Architecture
- Style: Modern architecture
- Years built: 2004–2005

Administration
- Diocese: Apostolic Vicariate of Pucallpa

The Immaculate Conception Cathedral (also known as Pucallpa Cathedral or the Cathedral of Ucayali; Spanish: Catedral de la Inmaculada Concepción) is the most important Catholic church in the Department of Ucayali in Peru. The cathedral was inaugurated on December 8, 2005. Located next to the provincial municipality and the Plaza de Armas, it is the local tourism center. Dedicated to the Virgin Mary, the first building dates back to the 1950s. It was built by the Apostolic Vicariate of Pucallpa under the command of Bishop Juan Luis Martín Bisson, with the support of the donations and work of thousands of citizens interested in its success. The first demonstration of the TANS Perú plane crash of was held at the church a week after its inauguration.

The inhabitants hold masses mainly dedicated to Jesus Christ and his life in addition to remembering the patron saints: the Lord of Miracles, St. Martin de Porres, Mary of Nazareth, and St. Rose of Lima, but presented in a modern way and adapted to the jungle.

== See also ==
- Roman Catholicism in Peru
- Immaculate Conception Cathedral

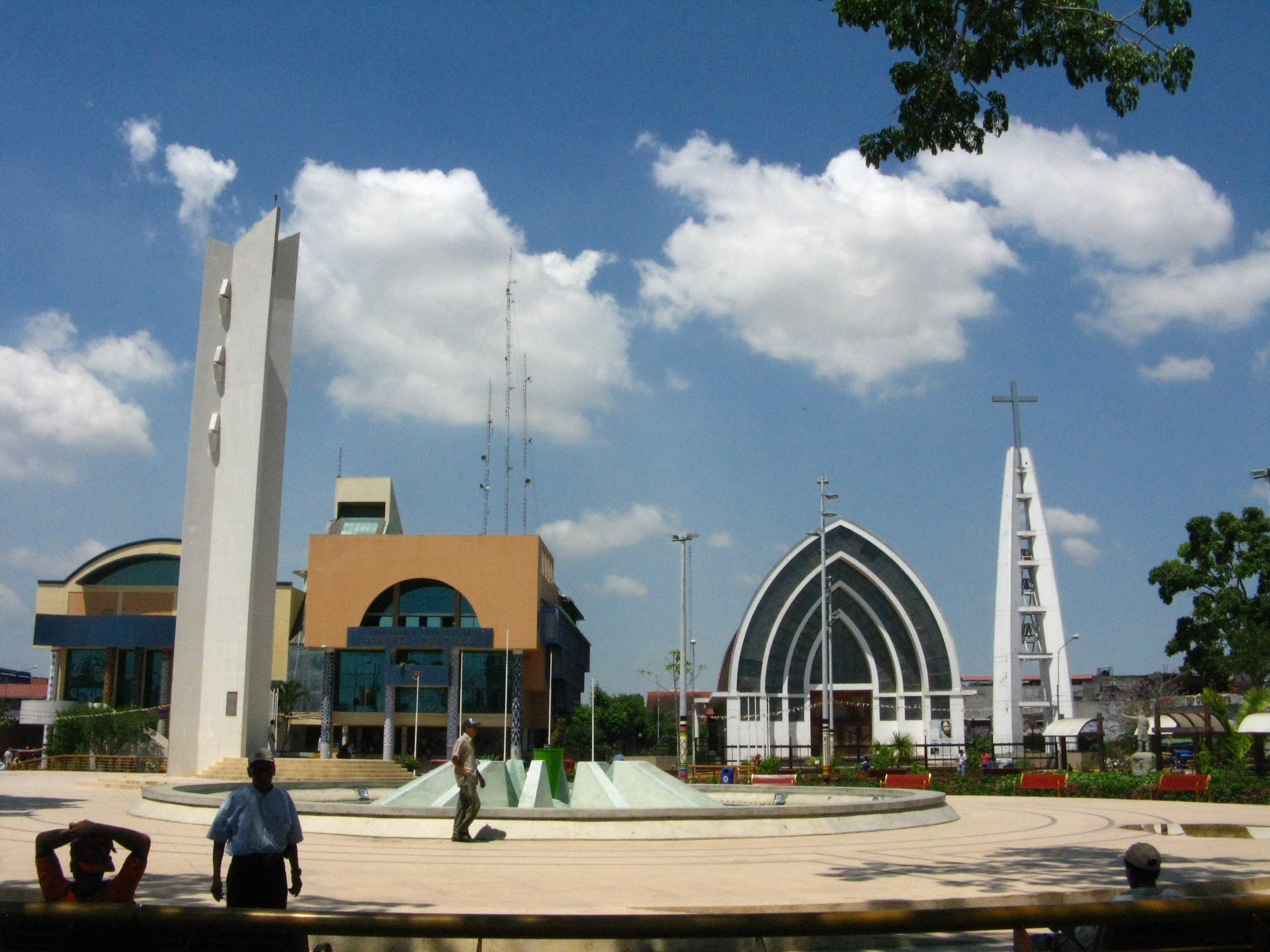
Another view
