= Julio Ojeda Pascual =

Roman Catholic bishop

Julio Ojeda Pascual O.F.M.
- Vicar Apostolic of San Ramón
- Church: Catholic Church
- See: Apostolic Vicariate of San Ramón
- In office: 30 March 1987 – 11 March 2003
- Predecessor: Luis María Blas Maestu Ojanguren
- Successor: Anton Žerdín Bukovec
- Other post: Titular Bishop of Fissiana (1987-2013)

Orders
- Ordination: 6 January 1957
- Consecration: 5 July 1987 by Juan Landázuri Ricketts

Personal details
- Born: 12 April 1932 Monasterio de Rodilla, Province of Burgos, Spanish Republic
- Died: 28 April 2013 (aged 81)

Julio Ojeda Pascual (12 April 1932 – 28 April 2013) was the Roman Catholic bishop of the Vicariate Apostolic of San Ramón, Peru.

Ordained to the priesthood in 1957, Ojeda Pascual was named bishop in 1987 and resigned in 2003.
