= Juan Luis Martin Buisson =

Canadian-born Peruvian Roman Catholic missionary and bishop (born 1934)

The Most Reverend Juan Luis Martin Buisson P.M.E.
- Titular bishop of Aquae in Numidia
- Church: Roman Catholic Church
- Diocese: Apostolic Vicariate of Pucallpa
- Appointed: 25 November 1989
- Term ended: 8 September 2008
- Predecessor: José Gustavo Prévost Godard
- Successor: Gaetano Galbusera Fumagalli
- Previous post: Coadjutor Apostolic Vicar of Pucallpa (1986–1989)

Orders
- Ordination: 1 July 1957
- Consecration: 17 August 1986 by Juan Landázuri Ricketts

Personal details
- Born: Jean-Louis Martin; 18 April 1934 (age 92) Trois-Rivières, Quebec, Canada
- Motto: Amor Verdad Justitia Paz

Juan Luis Martin Buisson P.M.E. (born as Jean-Louis Martin 18 April 1934) is a Canadian-born Peruvian Catholic prelate and missionary who served as Apostolic Vicar of Apostolic Vicariate of Pucallpa in Peru from 1989 until his retirement in 2008. A member of the Society of Foreign Missions of Quebec, he previously served as a missionary in Peru and Indonesia and as superior general of his religious congregation.

== Biography ==
=== Early life and priesthood ===
Martin Buisson was born on 18 April 1934 in Trois-Rivières, Quebec, Canada. He attended the Séminaire Saint-Joseph, where he developed his vocation to missionary work. He subsequently made theological studies at the Seminary of the Foreign Missions.

He was ordained a priest on 1 July 1957 for the Society of Foreign Missions of Quebec (PME).

Following his ordination, he made a missionary assignments in Peru and Indonesia, gaining pastoral experience in different cultural and ecclesiastical settings. In 1979, he was elected superior general of the Society of the Foreign Missions of Quebec, where served until 1985.

=== Episcopal ministry ===
On 18 April 1986, Martin Buisson was appointed titular bishop of Aquae in Numidia and coadjutor apostolic vicar of Apostolic Vicariate of Pucallpa, Peru. He received episcopal consecration on 17 August 1986.

He succeeded José Gustavo Prévost Godard as Apostolic Vicar of Pucallpa on 25 November 1989. In this position, he was responsible for the pastoral administration of the Catholic Church in the region, which includes extensive missionary territories in the Peruvian Amazon.

During his episcopate, Martin Buisson emphasized evangelization, Christian formation and social pastoral work. In an interview published by Agenzia Fides on 11 July 2006, he highlighted the shortage of priests in the vicariate, explaining that there was approximately one priest for every 25,000 inhabitants. He appealed for foreign priests willing to undertake missionary service in the Amazon region, preferably for periods of at least three years.

He described the pastoral challenges facing the vicariate, including the presence of numerous Indigenous communities, poverty, limited access to priests and the need for greater investment in religious education. He also identified social pastoral work, human rights, the promotion of women and children, and the pastoral care of prisoners as important areas of concern.

In August 2005, Pope John Paul II sent a telegram of condolence through Cardinal Angelo Sodano, then Secretary of State of the Holy See, addressed to Martin Buisson in his capacity as Apostolic Vicar of Pucallpa. The message expressed the Pope's sympathy for the victims of an aviation accident in Peru and offered condolences to their families.

=== Retirement ===
On 8 September 2008, Pope Benedict XVI accepted Martin Buisson's resignation from the pastoral government of the Apostolic Vicariate of Pucallpa, in accordance with canon 401 §1 of the Code of Canon Law. He was succeeded by his coadjutor, Gaetano Galbusera Fumagalli, a member of the Salesians of Don Bosco.

In 2008, he received recognition as an emeritus bishop from the Séminaire Saint-Joseph for his exceptional voluntary contribution to the community of Pucallpa. In 2011, the institution included him among its distinguished former students (Anciens émérites).
