= Aquae Albae in Byzacena =

Latin Catholic titular episcopal see

Aquae Albae in Byzacena was an Ancient city and bishopric in Roman Africa and remains a Latin Catholic titular see.

Its present location is Ain-Beida, in modern Tunisia (which has namesakes, notably in Algeria and Morocco).

== History ==
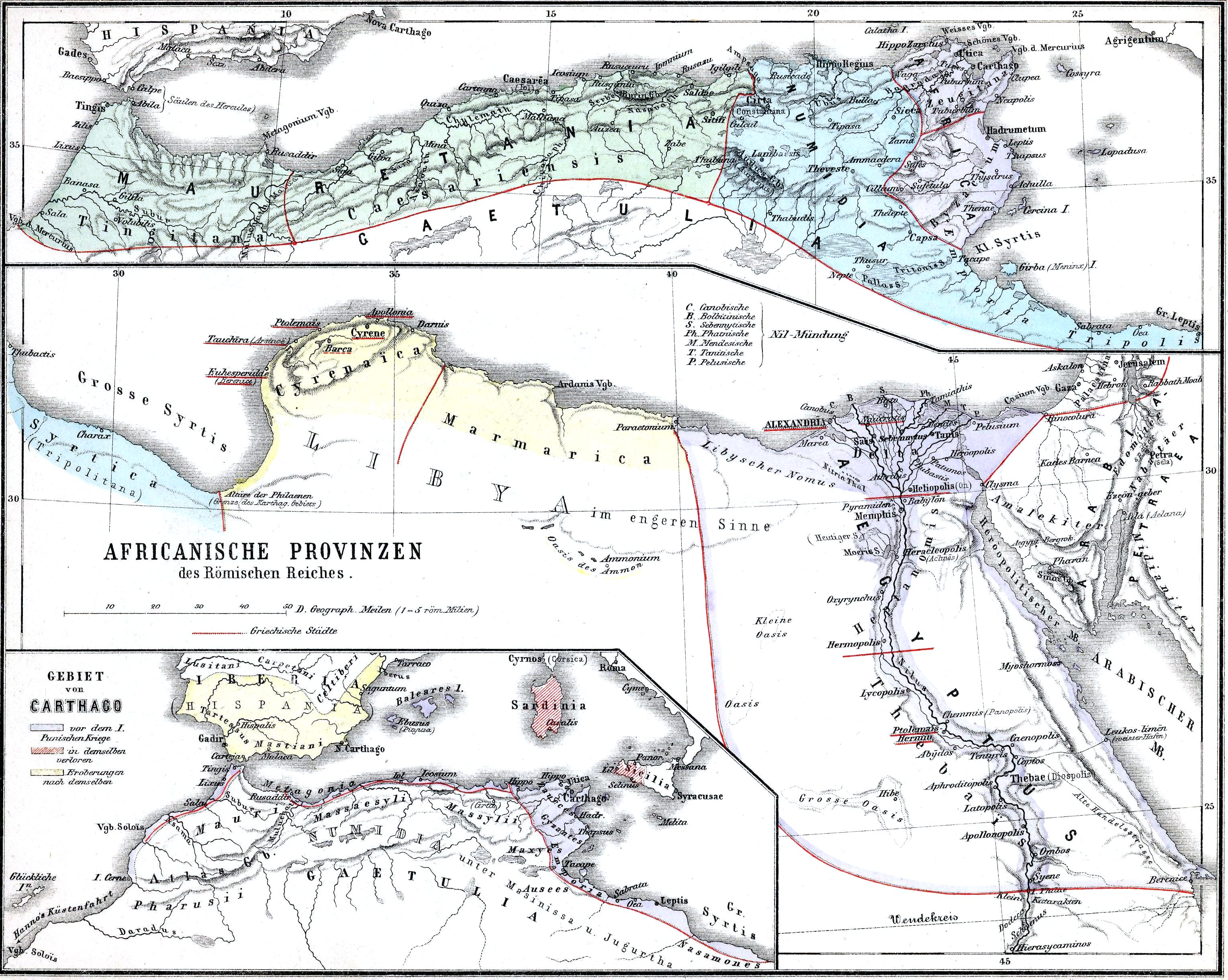
Roman Africa.

Aquae Albae was important enough in the Roman province of Byzacena to become one of the many suffragans of its capital Hadrumetum's Metropolitan Archbishop, but was to fade.

== Titular see ==
The diocese was nominally restored in 1933 as a Latin Catholic titular bishopric.

It has had the following incumbents, all of the lowest (episcopal) rank :

- Aimable Chassaigne (1962.01.23 – 1962.04.06)
- Paul Chevrier (1962.08.21 – 1968.10.04)
- Ramón Ovidio Pérez Morales (1970.12.02 – 1980.05.20) (later Archbishop)
- Anthony Joseph Bevilacqua (1980.10.04 – 1983.10.10) as Auxiliary Bishop of Brooklyn (NYC, USA) (1980.02.11 – 1983.10.10); later Bishop of Pittsburgh (USA) (1983.10.10 – 1988.02.11), Metropolitan Archbishop of Philadelphia (USA) (1988.02.11 – 2003.07.15), created Cardinal-Priest of SS. Redentore e S. Alfonso in Via Merulana (1991.06.28 – 2012.01.31)
- Piotr Krupa (1984.02.18 – 2024.03.04), Auxiliary Bishop emeritus of Pelplin (Poland)

== See also ==
- Aquae Albae in Mauretania
- Aquae in Byzacena
- Catholic Church in Algeria
- Catholic Church in Tunisia
