= Eugène Moke Motsüri =

- Titular bishop of Lestrona
- Church: Roman Catholic Church
- See: Titular see of Lestrona
- In office: 1970–2015
- Predecessor: none
- Successor: current

Orders
- Ordination: 9 June 1946

Personal details
- Born: 25 March 1916; Mongobele, Belgian Congo
- Died: 6 April 2015 (aged 99); Congo

Eugène Moke Motsüri (25 March 1916 – 6 April 2015) was a Democratic Republic of the Congo prelate of the Roman Catholic Church. He was one of the oldest living bishops and the oldest bishop in Africa until his death on 6 April 2015.

Motsüri was born in Mongobele, part of the Belgian Congo at the time, and ordained as a priest on 9 June 1946. Motsüri was appointed Auxiliary bishop of the Archdiocese of Kinshasa and titular bishop of Lestona on 1 September 1970. Motsüri stayed on as Auxiliary bishop of the Archdiocese of Kinshasa until his retirement on 11 May 1991.
