= Celada del Camino =

Coordinates: 42°16′N 3°56′W

- Municipality
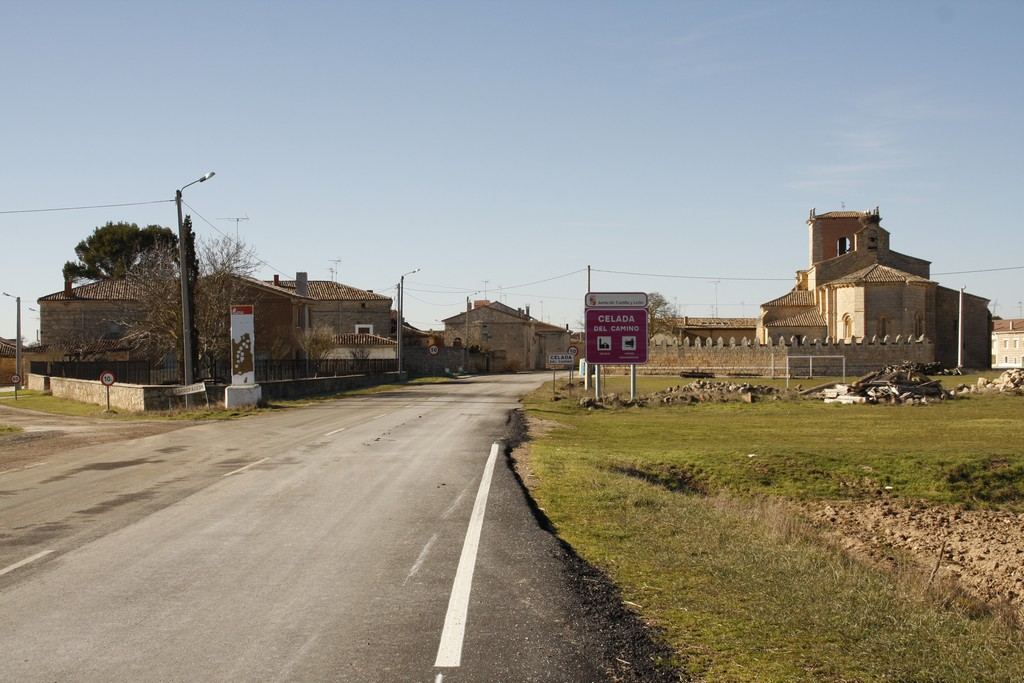
- View of Celada del Camino, 2010
- Interactive map of Celada del Camino
- Country: Spain
- Autonomous community: Castile and León
- Province: Burgos
- Comarca: Alfoz de Burgos

Area
  - Total: 13 km^{2} (5.0 sq mi)
- Elevation: 799 m (2,621 ft)

Population (2025-01-01)
  - Total: 91
  - Density: 7.0/km^{2} (18/sq mi)
- Time zone: UTC+1 (CET)
  - Summer (DST): UTC+2 (CEST)
- Postal code: 09226
- Website: https://www.celadadelcamino.es/

Celada del Camino is a municipality located in the province of Burgos, Castile and León, Spain. According to the 2004 census (INE), the municipality has a population of 99 inhabitants.
