= Villamayor de los Montes =

- municipality
- Coat of arms
- Interactive map of Villamayor de los Montes
- Coordinates: 42°06′21″N 3°45′56″W
- Country: Spain
- Autonomous community: Castile and León
- Province: Burgos

Area
  - Total: 40 km^{2} (15 sq mi)

Population (2025-01-01)
  - Total: 157
  - Density: 3.9/km^{2} (10/sq mi)
- Time zone: UTC+1 (CET)
  - Summer (DST): UTC+2 (CEST)

Villamayor de los Montes is a municipality located in the province of Burgos, Castile and León, Spain. According to the 2004 census (INE), the municipality has a population of 224 inhabitants.

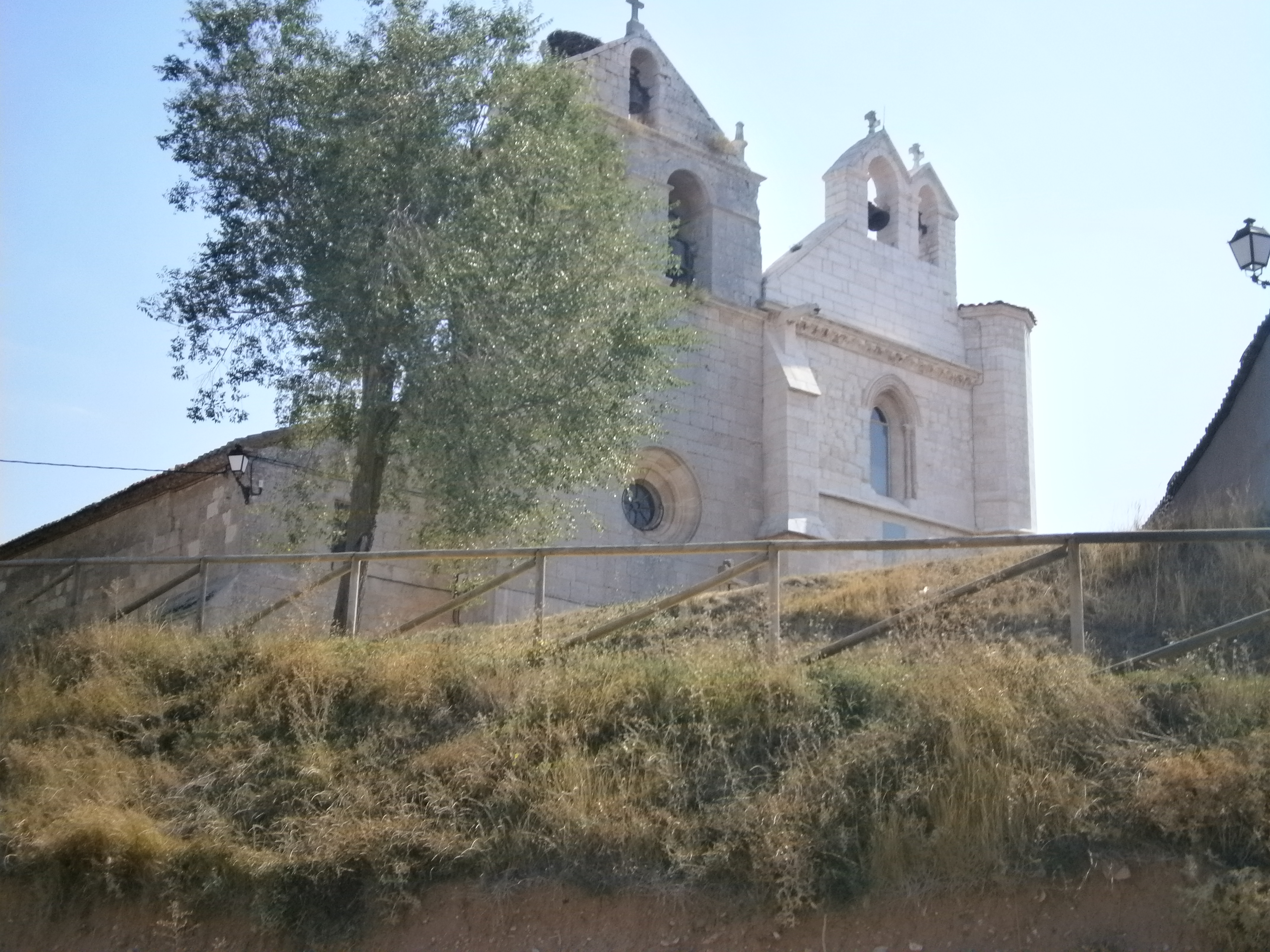
Monastery of Santa María la Real, Villamayor de los Montes
