= Diocese of Los Teques =

Roman Catholic diocese in Venezuela

Diocese of Los Teques Dioecesis Tequinensis

Catholic
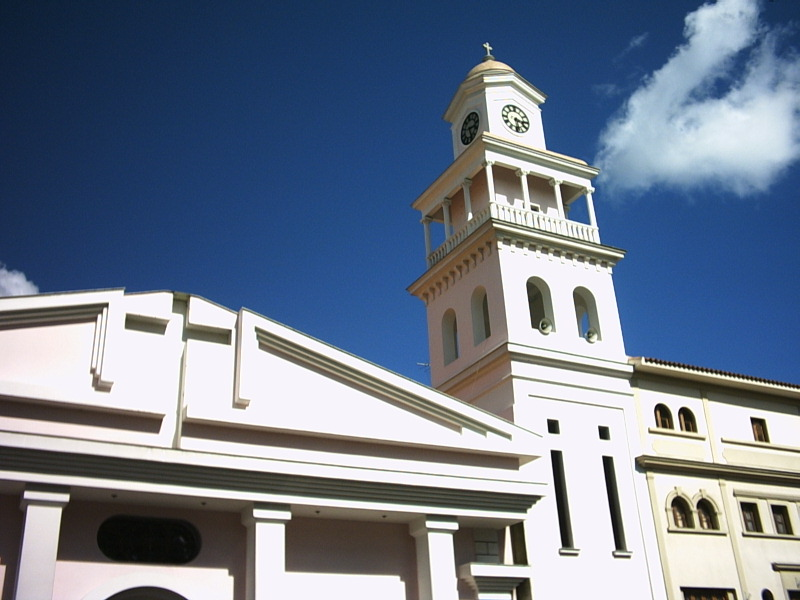
- Cathedral

Location
- Country: Venezuela
- Ecclesiastical province: Caracas

Statistics
- Area: 2,295 km^{2} (886 sq mi)
- Population: Total; Catholics: (as of 2004); 1,300,000; 1,100,000 (84.6%)

Information
- Denomination: Catholic Church
- Rite: Latin Rite
- Established: 23 July 1965 (61 years ago)
- Cathedral: St. Philip Neri Cathedral

Current leadership
- Pope: Leo XIV
- Bishop-Elect: Alberto Valentín Castillo García
- Bishops emeritus: Freddy Jesús Fuenmayor Suárez; Ramón Ovidio Pérez Morales

Map

The Roman Catholic Diocese of Los Teques (Latin: Dioecesis Tequinensis) is a diocese located in the city of Los Teques in the ecclesiastical province of Caracas in Venezuela.

== History ==
On 23 July 1965, Pope Paul VI established the Diocese of Los Teques from the Metropolitan Archdiocese of Caracas.

== Bishops ==
=== Ordinaries ===
- Juan José Bernal Ortiz (25 July 1965 – 19 October 1980), Archbishop (personal title)
- Pío Bello Ricardo, S.J. (31 January 1981 – 2 December 1995)
- Mario del Valle Moronta Rodríguez (2 December 1995 – 14 April 1999), appointed Bishop of San Cristóbal de Venezuela
- Ramón Ovidio Pérez Morales (5 June 1999 – 30 December 2004), Archbishop (personal title)
- Freddy Jesús Fuenmayor Suárez (30 December 2004 – 27 December 2025), retired
- Alberto Valentín Castillo García (27 December 2025 – Present)

=== Auxiliary bishop ===
- Pío Bello Ricardo, S.J. (1977–1981), appointed bishop here

== See also ==
- Roman Catholicism in Venezuela
