= Diocese of Popokabaka =

Roman Catholic diocese in the Democratic Republic of the Congo

Diocese of Popokabaka Dioecesis Popokabakaensis Diocèse catholique romain de Popokabaka

Location
- Country: Democratic Republic of the Congo
- Metropolitan: Kinshasa

Statistics
- Area: 45,000 km^{2} (17,000 sq mi)
- Population: Total; Catholics: (as of 1996); 792,000; 495,446 (62.6%)

Information
- Rite: Latin Rite

Current leadership
- Pope: Leo XIV
- Bishop: Bernard Marie Fansaka Biniama

The Roman Catholic Diocese of Popokabaka (Latin: Romano-Catholicae Dioecesis Popokabaka, French: Diocèse catholique romain de Popokabaka) is a diocese located in the city of Popokabaka in the ecclesiastical province of Kinshasa in the Democratic Republic of the Congo.

== History ==
- 24 June 1961: Established as Diocese of Popokabaka from the Diocese of Kisantu

== Bishops ==
=== Bishops of Popokabaka ===
- Pierre Bouckaert, S.J. (24 June 1961 – 1 December 1979)
- André Mayamba Mabuti Kathongo (1 December 1979 – 24 September 1993)
- Louis Nzala Kianza (22 April 1996 – 29 June 2020)
- Bernard Marie Fansaka Biniama (installed 23 August 2020 -)

=== Coadjutor bishop ===
- André Mayamba Mabuti Kathongo (1978-1979)

=== Other priest of this diocese who became bishop ===
- Charles Ndaka Salabisala, appointed auxiliary bishop of Kinshasa in 2020

== See also ==
- Roman Catholicism in the Democratic Republic of the Congo

== Sources ==
- GCatholic.org
- Catholic Hierarchy
