= Apostolic Vicariate of San Ramón =

Latin Catholic ecclesiastical jurisdiction in Peru

Apostolic Vicariate of San Ramón Apostolicus Vicariatus Sancti Raymundi Vicariato Apostólico de San Ramón

Location
- Country: Peru
- Metropolitan: Immediately exemption to the Holy See

Statistics
- Area: 80,000 km^{2} (31,000 sq mi)
- Population: Total; Catholics: 429,000 (2010); 322,000 (2010)

Information
- Denomination: Catholic Church
- Sui iuris church: Latin Church
- Rite: Roman Rite

Current leadership
- Bishop: Anton Žerdín Bukovec, O.F.M.

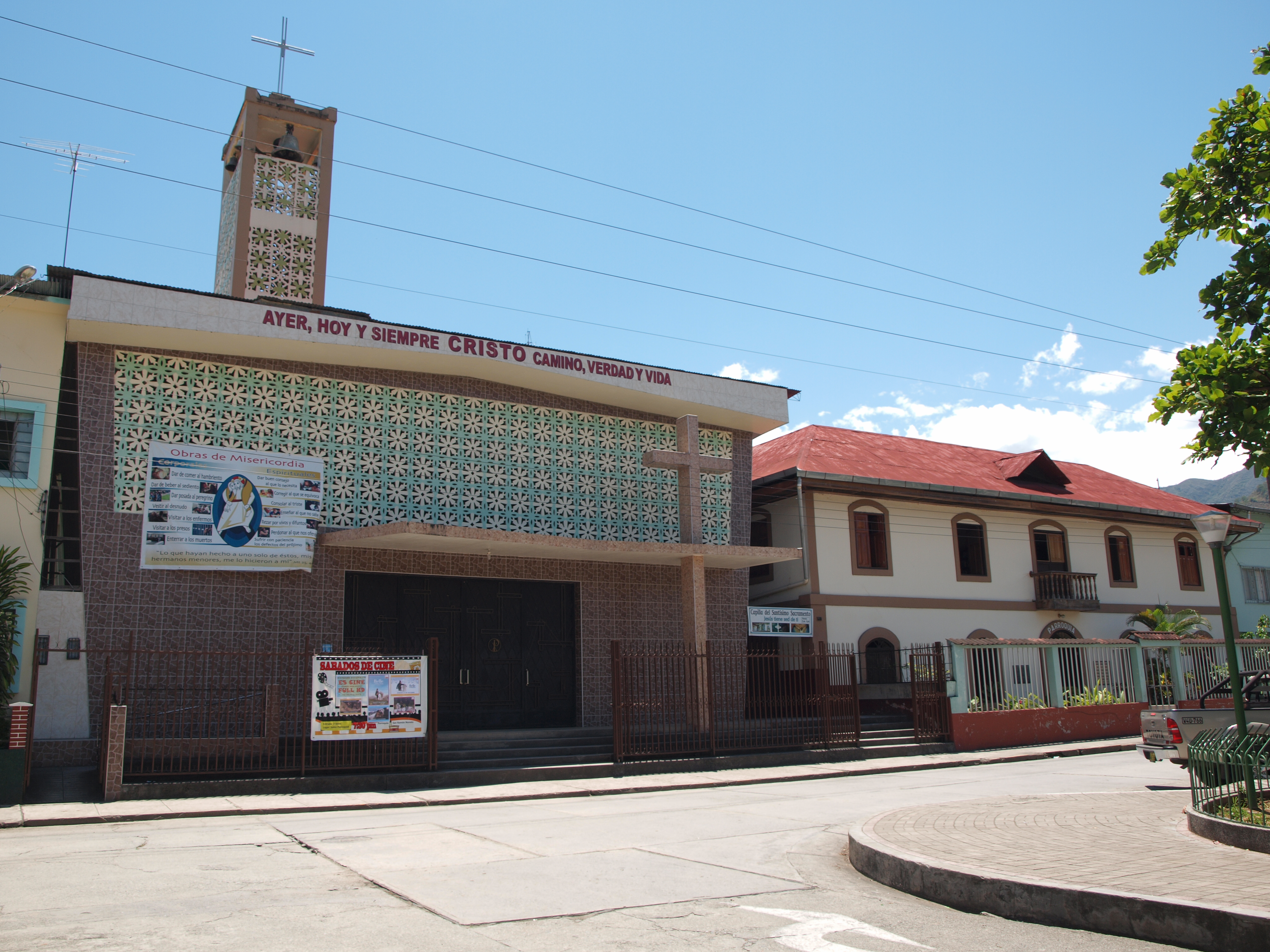
San Ramón Main Square

The Apostolic Vicariate of San Ramón (Latin: Apostolicus Vicariatus Sancti Raymundi) is a Latin Church apostolic vicariate of the Catholic Church located in the episcopal see of San Ramón in Peru.

== History ==
- March 2, 1956: Established as Apostolic Vicariate of San Ramón from the suppressed Vicariate Apostolic of Ucayali (along with two other vicariates: Vicariate Apostolic of Pucallpa and Vicariate Apostolic of Requena).

== Bishops ==
- Vicar Apostolics of San Ramon
  - Bishop León Buenaventura de Uriarte Bengoa, O.F.M. (March 2, 1956 – January 19, 1970)
  - Bishop Luis María Blas Maestu Ojanguren, O.F.M. (March 11, 1971 – January 24, 1987)
  - Bishop Julio Ojeda Pascual, O.F.M. (March 30, 1987 – March 11, 2003)
  - Bishop Anton Žerdín Bukovec, O.F.M. (March 11, 2003 – present)

=== Coadjutor Vicar Apostolic ===
- Anton (Gerardo Antonio) Žerdín Bukovec, O.F.M. (2002-2003)
