= Teresa Muñoz =

Catalan writer

Teresa Muñoz (born 1974) is a Catalan writer. She was born in Barcelona, and obtained her bachelor's and master's degrees from the University of Barcelona. Since then, she has been closely involved with teaching and publishing in Catalan.

Her debut novel Com si fos ahir was published in 2014 to critical praise. She has published three books, all in Catalan:

- Com si fos ahir
- Des del balco
- Vint-i-set dinosaures
