= José Moko Ekanga =

Congolese Catholic prelate (born 1958)

The Most Reverend José Moko Ekanga
- Bishop of Idiofa, Democratic Republic of the Congo
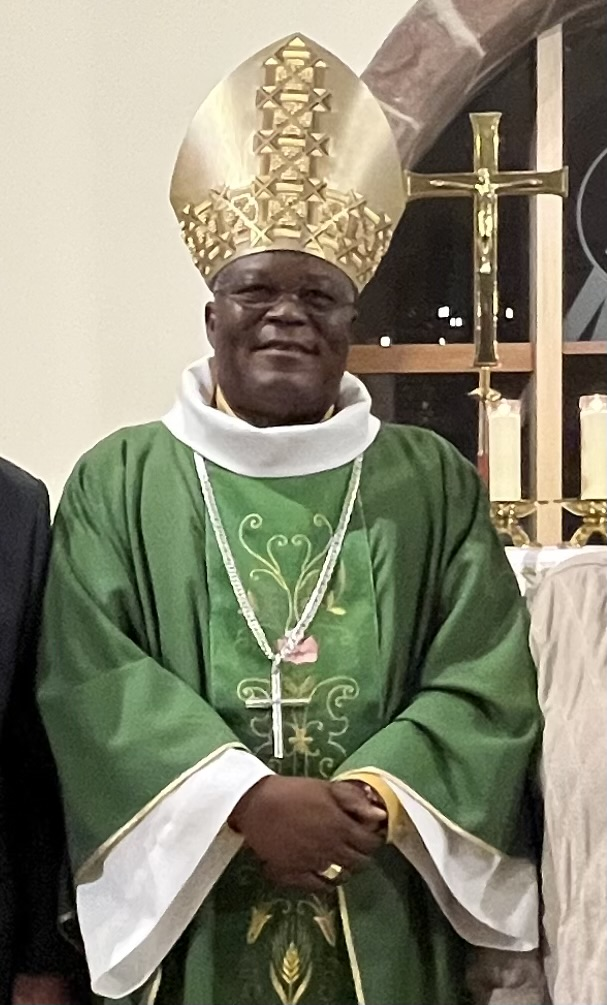
- Church: Catholic Church
- Archdiocese: Roman Catholic Archdiocese of Kinshasa
- See: Roman Catholic Diocese of Idiofa
- Appointed: 26 May 2009
- Installed: 15 August 2009
- Predecessor: Louis Mbwôl-Mpasi
- Successor: Incumbent

Orders
- Ordination: 21 February 1988
- Consecration: 15 August 2009 by Laurent Monsengwo Pasinya
- Rank: Bishop

Personal details
- Born: José Moko Ekanga; 18 July 1958 (age 67) Kinshasa, Belgian Congo

Styles of José Moko Ekanga
- Reference style: Your Lordship; The Most Reverend
- Spoken style: His Lordship
- Religious style: Bishop

José Moko Ekanga P.S.S. (born 18 July 1958) is a Congolese Catholic prelate who is the Bishop of the Roman Catholic Diocese of Idiofa in the Democratic Republic of the Congo since 26 May 2009. Before that, from 1 August 1986 until he was appointed bishop, he was a priest of the Roman Catholic Archdiocese of Kinshasa. He was appointed bishop on 26 May 2009 by Pope Benedict XVI. He was consecrated as bishop and installed at Idiofa, Democratic Congo on 15 August 2009. He is a member of the Society of the Priests of Saint Sulpice.

== Background and education ==
He was born on 18 July 1958 in Kinshasa, present time – Democratic Congo. He attended primary school in Kinshasa. He studied at the Literary School of Selembao, in Selembao for his secondary school education. He studied philosophy at the Saint Kaggwa Major Seminary. He then transferred to the Catholic University of the Congo in Kinshasa, where he studied Theology from 1979 until 1986. He graduated from there with a Licentiate in Biblical Theology. He holds a Doctorate in Sacred Scripture awarded by an institution in Lyon, France, where he studied from 1999 until 2005.

== Priest ==
On 1 August 1986, he was ordained a priest of the Roman Catholic Archdiocese of Kinshasa. He served as priest until 26 May 2009.

While a priest, he served in various roles including as:

- Spiritual Director at the Philosophical Major Seminary of St. Kaggwa, in Kinshasha from 1986 until 1988.
- Priest in the Community of Saint Sulpice in France from 1988 until 1989.
- Formator at the St. Kaggwa Seminary from 1989 until 1996.
- President of the Assembly of the Clergy of Kinshasa, based in Gombe from 1993 until 1997.
- Pastor of Saint Gyavira in Kinshasa from 1996 until 1998.
- Studies for a Doctorate in Sacred Scripture in Lyon, France from 1999 until 2005.
- Professor at the Saint Gal Seminary, in Benin, West Africa from 1999 until 2005.
- Pastor of the Parish of Saint Anne, in Kinshasa from 2005 until 2007.
- Pastor of Notre Dame Cathedral in Kinshasa from 2007 until 2008.
- Rector of the “Jean XXIII” University Seminary in Kinshasa from 2008 until 2009.
- Member of the Priestly Council of Kinshasa until 2009.

== Bishop ==
Pope Benedict XVI appointed him Bishop of the Roman Catholic Diocese of Idiofa on 26 May 2009. He was consecrated and installed at Idiofa on 15 August 2009 by the hands of Archbishop Laurent Monsengwo Pasinya, Archbishop of Kinshasa assisted by Bishop Louis Nzala Kianza, Bishop of Popokabaka and Bishop Marie-Edouard Mununu Kasiala, Bishop of Kikwit.

In October 2020 he was elected vice-president of the Episcopal Conference of the Democratic Republic of the Congo (CENCO). In 2023 he was elected President of the Association of Episcopal Conferences of Central Africa (ACEAC), that unites the Catholic Episcopal Conferences in Burundi, Rwanda and DR Congo.

== See also ==
- Catholic Church in the Democratic Republic of the Congo

== Succession table ==
Catholic Church titles
Preceded by Louis Mbwôl-Mpasi (20 May 1997 - 31 May 2006)	Bishop of Idiofa (since 26 May 2009)	Succeeded by Incumbent
