= Mario Moronta =

Venezuelan Roman Catholic bishop (1949–2025)

His Excellency Mario Moronta
- Bishop Emeritus of San Cristóbal de Venezuela
- Archdiocese: Mérida
- Diocese: San Cristóbal de Venezuela
- Appointed: April 14, 1999
- Term ended: October 31, 2024
- Predecessor: Marco Tulio Ramírez Roa
- Successor: Lisandro Alirio Rivas Durán
- Previous posts: Auxiliary Bishop of Caracas and Titular Bishop of Nova (1990–1995); Bishop of Los Teques (1995–1999)

Orders
- Ordination: April 19, 1975
- Consecration: May 27, 1990 by José Lebrún Moratinos

Personal details
- Born: Mario del Valle Moronta Rodríguez; February 10, 1949 Caracas, Venezuela
- Died: August 4, 2025 (aged 76) San Cristóbal, Táchira, Venezuela
- Education: Servidor y testigo
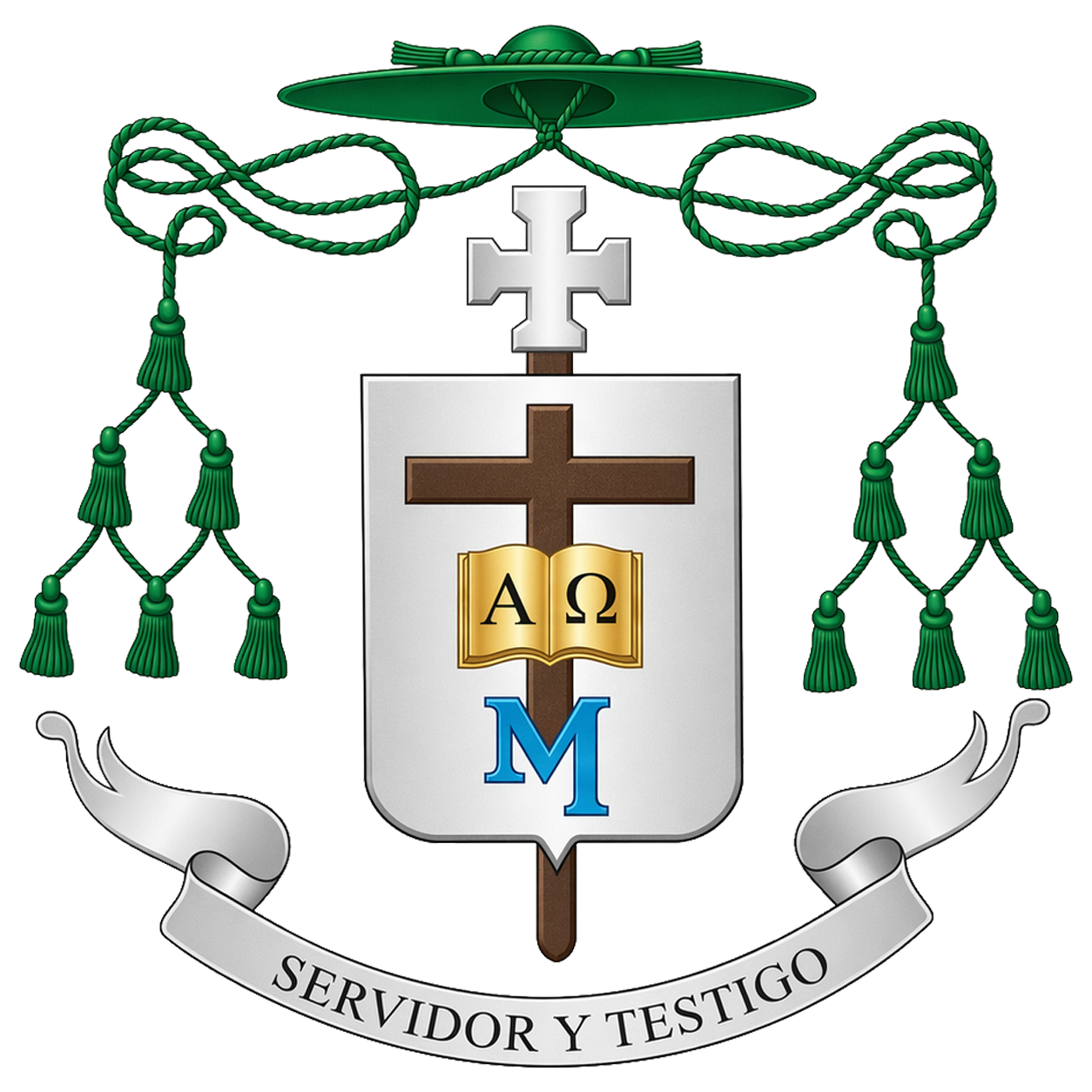
- Coat of arms

Styles of Mario Moronta
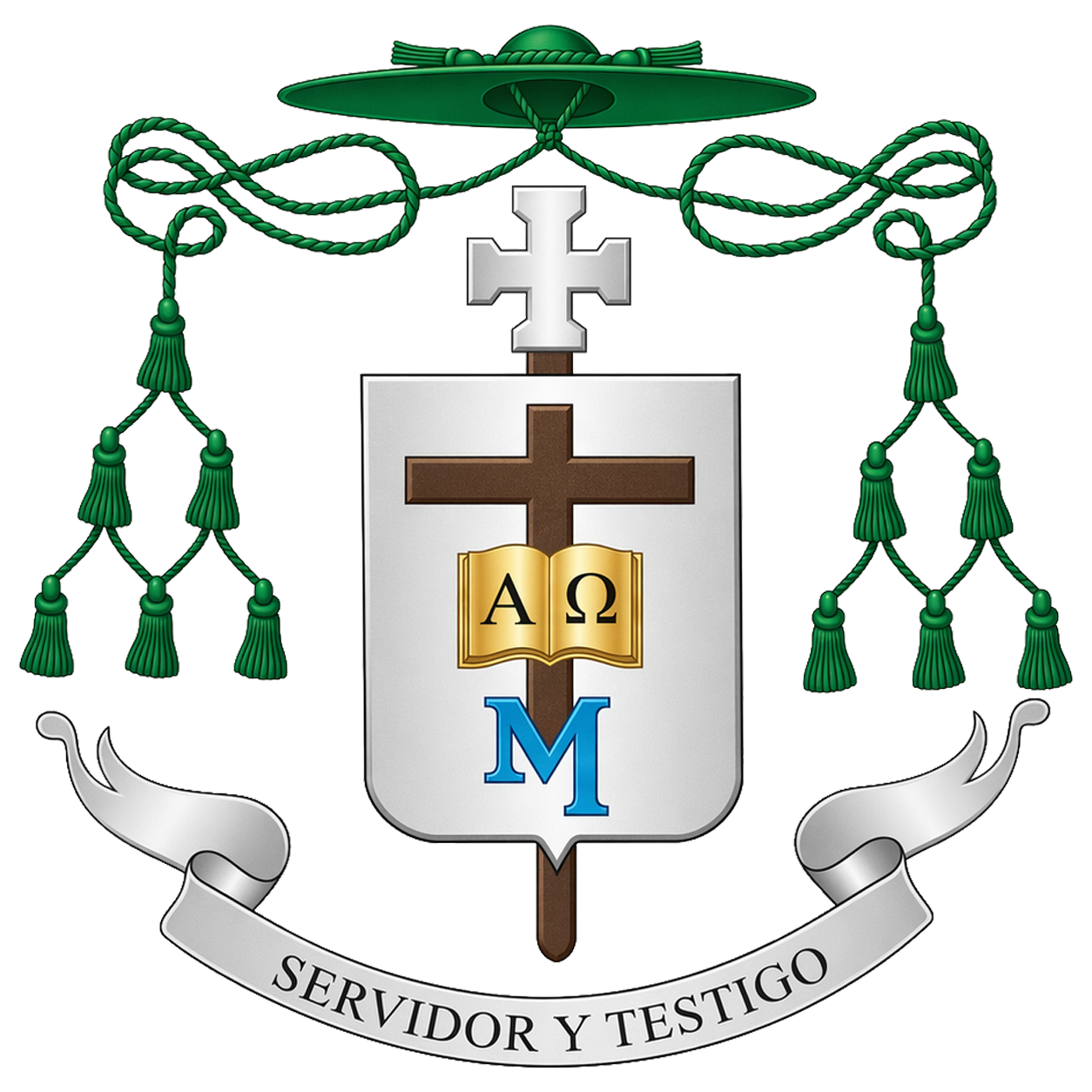
- Reference style: His Excellency; The Most Reverend
- Spoken style: Your Excellency
- Religious style: Bishop

Mario del Valle Moronta Rodríguez (Spanish: [ˈmaɾjo ðel ˈβaʎe moˈɾonta roðˈɾiɣes]; February 10, 1949 – August 4, 2025) was a Venezuelan Roman Catholic bishop. He was Bishop of the Diocese of San Cristóbal de Venezuela.

== Biography ==
Moronta was born in Caracas on February 10, 1949. He was ordained a priest on April 19, 1975, incardinated in the Diocese of Los Teques.

Moronta died in San Cristóbal, Táchira, Venezuela on August 4, 2025, at the age of 76.

Catholic Church titles
Preceded by Marco Tulio Ramírez Roa	Bishop of San Cristóbal de Venezuela; 1999–2024	Succeeded by Lisandro Alirio Rivas Durán
Preceded by Pío Bello Ricardo	Bishop of Los Teques; 1995–1999	Succeeded by Ramón Ovidio Pérez Morales
Preceded by Lajos Bálint	Titular Bishop of Nova; 1990–1995	Succeeded by Luigi De Magistris
Preceded by —	Auxiliary Bishop of Caracas; 1990–1995	Succeeded by —
