= Thucca Terenbenthina =

Ancient Roman-Berber town

Africa Proconsularis (125 AD)

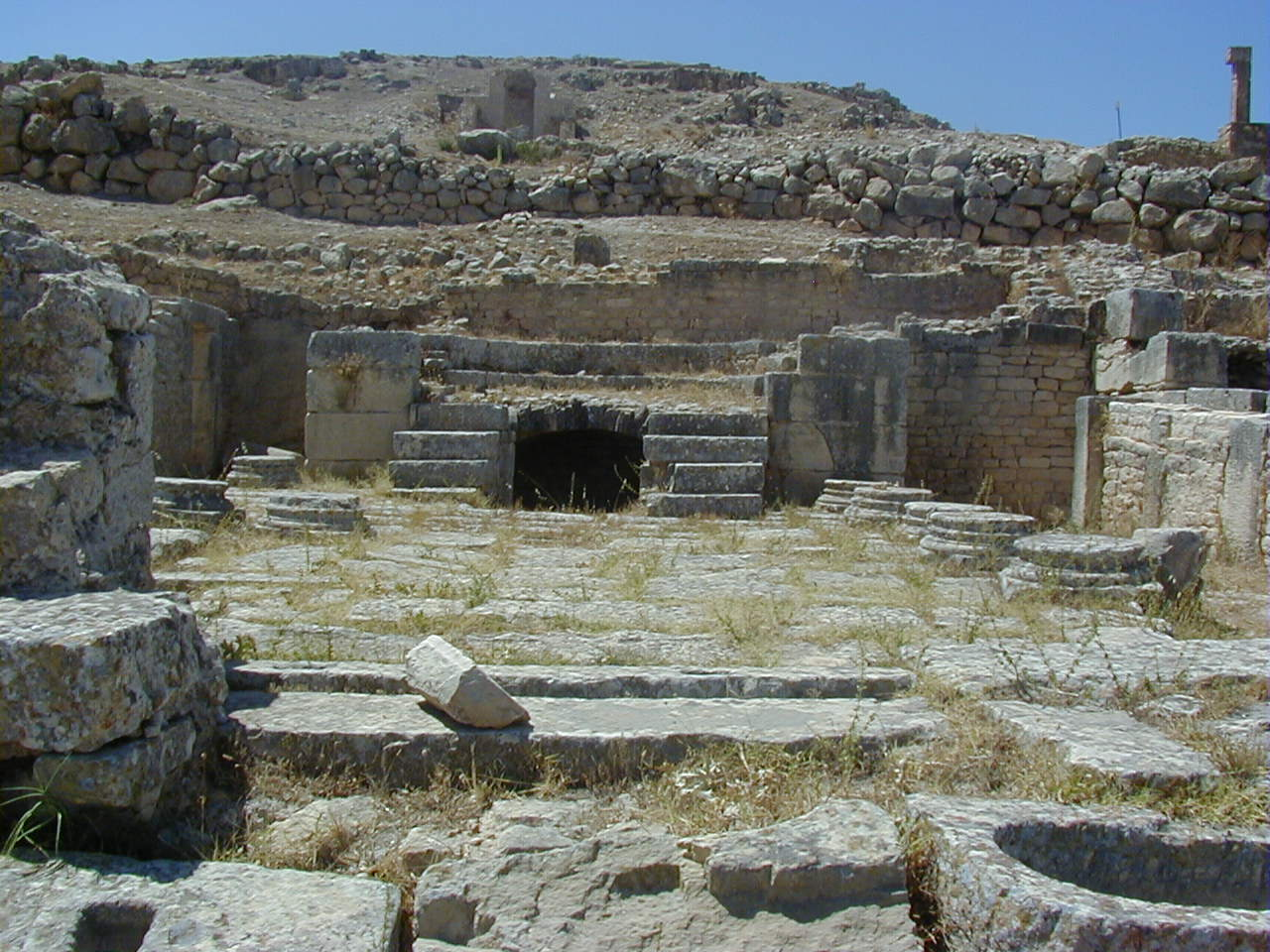
Only Church Building found in Thucca Terenbenthina.

Thucca Terenbenthina, also known as Thugga, was an ancient Roman-Berber town in the province of African Proconsularis. In late antiquity, it was made a municipium of the province of Byzacena. Thucca Terenbenthina is identified with ruins located in the modern town of Dougga, Tunisia.

The town of Thucca Terenbenthina was also seat of the small but ancient bishopric of Diocese of Thucca Terenbenthina which remains a titular see of the Roman Catholic Church to this day.
