= Villaldemiro =

Coordinates: 42°15′N 3°59′W

- municipality
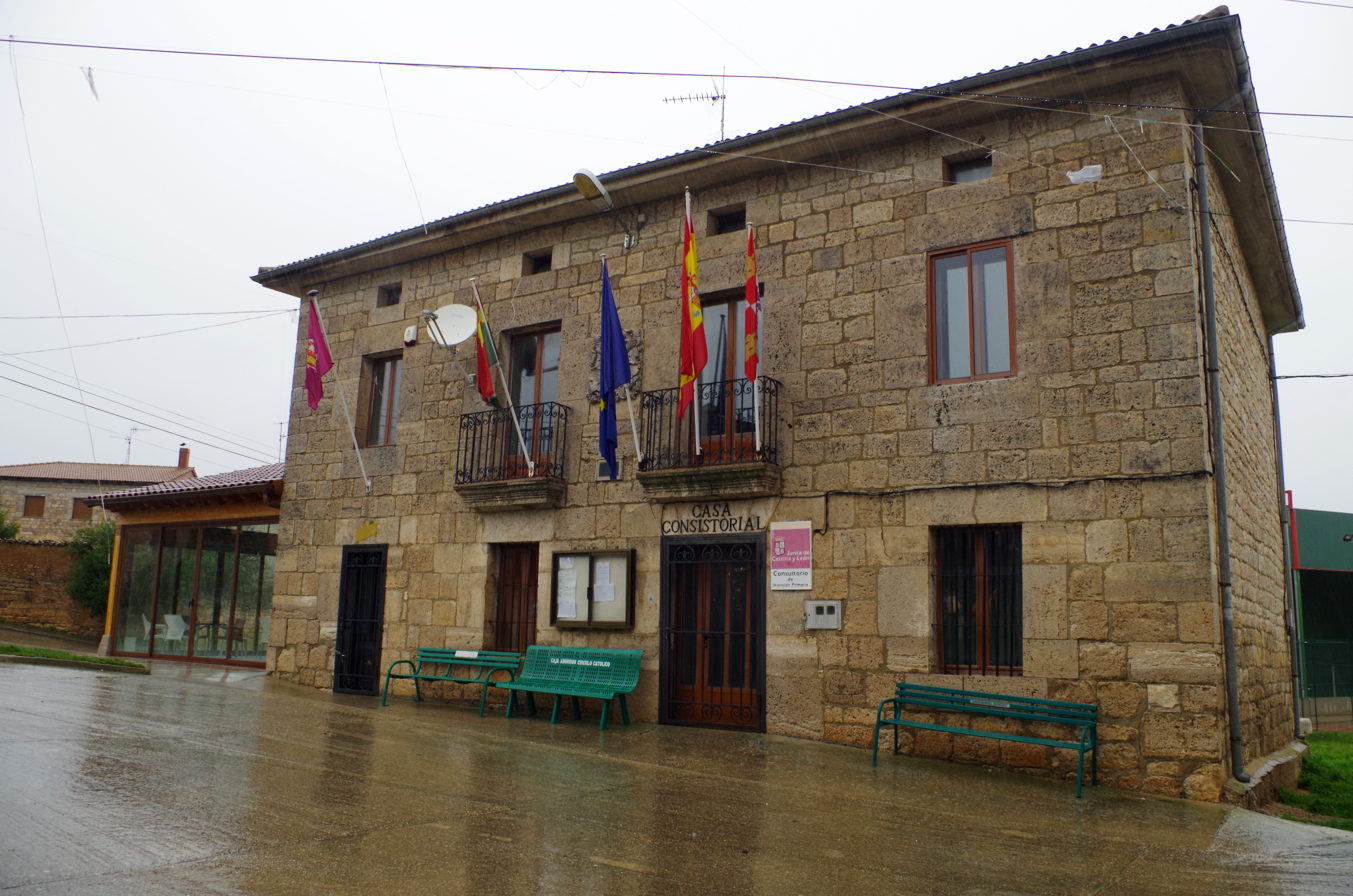
- Villaldemiro Town Hall

- Coat of arms
- Interactive map of Villaldemiro
- Country: Spain
- Autonomous community: Castile and León
- Province: Burgos

Area
  - Total: 13 km^{2} (5.0 sq mi)

Population (2025-01-01)
  - Total: 92
  - Density: 7.1/km^{2} (18/sq mi)
- Time zone: UTC+1 (CET)
  - Summer (DST): UTC+2 (CEST)

Villaldemiro is a municipality located in the province of Burgos, Castile and León, Spain. According to the 2004 census (INE), the municipality has a population of 70 inhabitants.
