= Louis Nzala Kianza =

Congolese Catholic priest (1946–2020)

Louis Nzala Kianza (6 February 1946 – 26 November 2020) was a Congolese Roman Catholic bishop.

== Biography ==
Nzala Kianza was born in the Democratic Republic of the Congo and was ordained to the priesthood in 1972. He served as bishop of the Roman Catholic Diocese of Popokabaka, Democratic Republic of the Congo from 1996 until his retirement in 2020. He also served as the apostolic administrator of the Roman Catholic Diocese of Idiofa, Democratic Republic of the Congo, from 2006 to 2009.
