= Anton Žerdín Bukovec =

Priest of Peru

The Most Reverend Gerardo Antonio Zerdín Bukovec O.F.M.
- Apostolic Coadjutor Vicar of San Ramón; Titular Bishop of Thucca terebenthina
- Church: Roman Catholic
- See: San Ramón
- Predecessor: Julio Ojeda Pascual

Orders
- Consecration: 14 April 2002 by Julio Ojeda Pascual
- Rank: Bishop

Personal details
- Born: 11 June 1950 (age 75) Lendava
- Denomination: Catholic

Gerardo Antonio Zerdín Bukovec (born 11 June 1950 in Lendava) is a Slovenian-Croatian prelate and Apostolic Vicar of San Ramón in Peru.

== Life ==
Gerardo Antonio Zerdín Bukovec joined the Order of Franciscans (OFM) and received the priestly ordination on 9 November 1975. Pope John Paul II appointed him on 19 January 2002 as Apostolic Coadjutor Vicar of San Ramón and titular bishop of Thucca terebenthina.

The Apostolic Vicariate of San Ramón, Julio Ojeda Pascual, gave him the bishop's ordination on 14 April of that year; Co-consecrators were Rino Passigato, Apostolic Nuncio in Peru, and Victor de la Peña Perez, Apostolic Vicar of Requena.
