= Revilla del Campo =

Coordinates: 42°13′N 3°32′W

- Municipality and town
- Coat of arms
- Interactive map of Revilla del Campo
- Country: Spain
- Autonomous community: Castile and León
- Province: Burgos
- Comarca: Alfoz de Burgos

Area
  - Total: 39.04 km^{2} (15.07 sq mi)
- Elevation: 951 m (3,120 ft)

Population (2025-01-01)
  - Total: 96
  - Density: 2.5/km^{2} (6.4/sq mi)
- Time zone: UTC+1 (CET)
  - Summer (DST): UTC+2 (CEST)
- Postal code: 09194
- Website: http://www.revilladelcampo.es/

Revilla del Campo is a municipality and town located in the province of Burgos, Castile and León, Spain. According to the 2004 census (INE), the municipality has a population of 132 inhabitants.
