= List of cathedrals in Venezuela =

This is the list of cathedrals in Venezuela.

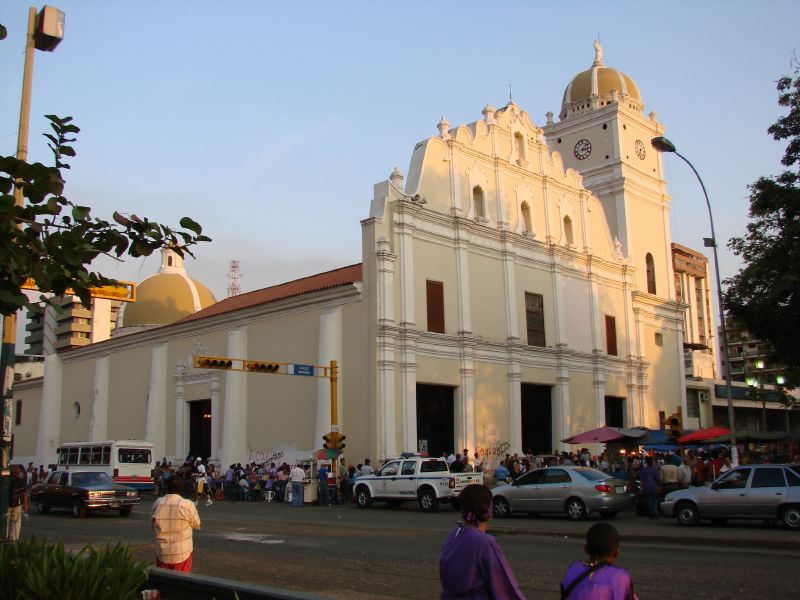
Cathedral of Our Lady of the Assumption in Maracay.

== Catholic ==
Cathedrals of the Catholic Church in Venezuela:

- Catedral de Nuestra Señora de la Corteza in Acarigua
- Cathedral of St. Christopher in Barcelona
- Cathedral of Our Lady of the Pillar in Barinas
- Cathedral of Our Lady of Mount Carmel in Barquisimeto
- Cathedral of Our Lady of the Rosary in Cabimas
- All Saints Cathedral in Calabozo
- Metropolitan Cathedral of St. Ann in Caracas
- Cathedral of St. John the Baptist in Carora
- Cathedral of St. Rose of Lima in Carúpano
- Cathedral of St. Thomas in Ciudad Bolívar
- Pro-Cathedral of Our Lady of Fatima in Ciudad Guayana
- Cathedral Basilica of St. Ann in Coro
- Metropolitan Cathedral of St. Agnes in Cumaná
- Cathedral of Our Lady of Perpetual Help in El Vigia
- Basílica Catedral Nuestra Señora de Coromoto in Guanare
- Catedral Nuestra Señora de Copacabana in Guarenas
- Our Lady of Mount Carmel Cathedral, Guasdualito
- Cathedral of St. Peter the Apostle in La Guaira
- Cathedral of St. Philip Neri in Los Teques
- Cathedral of Our Lady of Mount Carmel in Machiques
- Cathedral of Sts. Peter and Paul in Maracaibo
- Cathedral of Our Lady of the Assumption in Maracay
- Cathedral of Our Lady of the Assumption in La Asunción
- Cathedral of Our Lady of Mount Carmel in Maturín
- Cathedral Basilica of the Immaculate Conception in Mérida
- Cathedral of Mary Help of Christians in Puerto Ayacucho
- Cathedral of St. Joseph in Puerto Cabello
- Catedral of Our Lady of Coromoto in Punto Fijo
- Cathedral of the Immaculate Conception in San Carlos
- Cathedral of St. Christopher in San Cristóbal
- Cathedral of St. Philip the Apostle in San Felipe
- Cathedral of Our Lady of Mount Carmel in San Fernando de Apure
- Cathedral of St. Helen in Santa Elena de Uairén
- Cathedral of Our Lady of Peace in Trujillo
- Catedral de la Divina Pastora in Tucupita
- Cathedral Basilica of Our Lady of Help in Valencia
- Cathedral of Our Lady of Candelaria in Valle de la Pascua
- Cathedral of Our Lady of the Assumption in Maracay (Syriac Catholic)
- Cathedral of St. George in Caracas (Melkite Greek)

== See also ==
- List of cathedrals
