= José de Jesús Núñez Viloria =

Venezuelan Roman Catholic bishop (1938–2024)

His Excellency José de Jesús Núñez Viloria
- Bishop Emeritus of Ciudad Guayana
- Metropolis: Ciudad Bolívar
- Diocese: Ciudad Guayana
- Appointed: 13 January 1987
- Term ended: 21 July 1990
- Predecessor: Medardo Luis Luzardo Romero
- Successor: Ubaldo Ramón Santana Sequera
- Previous posts: Auxiliary Bishop of Ciudad Bolívar and Titular Bishop of Cenae (1982–1987)

Orders
- Ordination: 12 August 1962
- Consecration: 19 March 1982 by José Léon Rojas Chaparro

Personal details
- Born: 2 January 1938 Betijoque, Venezuela
- Died: 3 July 2024 (aged 86) Ciudad Bolívar, Venezuela

José de Jesús Núñez Viloria (2 January 1938 – 3 July 2024) was a Venezuelan Roman Catholic prelate, who served as an auxiliary bishop of Ciudad Bolívar (1982–1987) and a diocesan bishop of Ciudad Guayana (1987–1990).

== Biography ==
Núñez Viloria was born in Betijoque, Trujillo State in Venezuela and was ordained priest on 12 August 1962.

He was elected to the titular see of Cenae and at the same time appointed auxiliary bishop of the Roman Catholic Archdiocese of Ciudad Bolívar on 8 January 1982, he received the episcopal consecration on the following 19 March. On 13 January 1987, he was transferred as a diocesan bishop to the residential see of Ciudad Guayana and on 21 July 1990 he renounced the pastoral governance of the diocese.

Catholic Church titles
Preceded by Medardo Luis Luzardo Romero	Bishop of Ciudad Guayana; 1987–1990	Succeeded by Ubaldo Ramón Santana Sequera
Preceded by Carlos Alberto Etchandy Gimeno Navarro	Titular Bishop of Cenae; 1982–1987	Succeeded by Amédée Grab
Preceded by —	Auxiliary Bishop of Ciudad Bolívar; 1982–1987	Succeeded by —
