= Apostolic Vicariate of Puerto Ayacucho =

Latin Catholic ecclesiastical jurisdiction in Venezuela

Apostolic Vicariate of Puerto Ayacucho Vicariatus Apostolicus Portus Ayacuquensis Vicariato apostólico de Puerto Ayacucho
- Cathedral of Mary Help of Christians, Puerto Ayacucho

Location
- Country: Venezuela
- Ecclesiastical province: Immediately exempt to the Holy See
- Headquarters: Puerto Ayacucho, Amazonas, Venezuela

Statistics
- Area: 180,000 km^{2} (69,000 sq mi)
- Population: Total; Catholics: (as of 2024); 212,000; 151,000 (71.2%)
- Parishes: 13

Information
- Denomination: Catholic Church
- Sui iuris church: Latin Church
- Rite: Roman Rite
- Established: 5 February 1932; 94 years ago
- Cathedral: Cathedral of Mary Help of Christians, Puerto Ayacucho
- Secular priests: 24 (10 Diocesan, 14 Religious Orders)

Current leadership
- Pope: Leo XIV
- Vicar Apostolic: Jonny Eduardo Reyes Sequera, S.D.B.
- Bishops emeritus: José Ángel Divassón Cilveti, S.D.B.

Map

The Apostolic Vicariate (or Vicariate Apostolic) of Puerto Ayacucho (Latin: Apostolicus Vicariatus Portus Ayacuquensis) is a Latin Church missionary ecclesiastical jurisdiction or apostolic vicariate of the Catholic Church in Venezuela.

Its cathedral see, Catedral María Auxiliadora, is located in the town of Puerto Ayacucho, in Venezuela's Amazonas state. It is immediately exempt to the Holy See and not part of any ecclesiastical province.

== History ==
On 5 February 1932 Pope Pius XI established the Prefecture Apostolic of Alto Orinoco from territory taken from the then Diocese of Santo Tomás de Guayana (which meanwhile became the Metropolitan Archdiocese of Ciudad Bolívar).

It was elevated to a Vicariate Apostolic and given its present name by Pope Pius XII on 7 May 1953.

== Ordinaries ==
So far, all incumbents have been members of the missionary Salesians (S.D.B.) congregation

Apostolic Prefects of Alto Orinoco

- Enrico de Ferrari, S.D.B. (14 November 1932 – 3 August 1945)
- Cosme Alterio, S.D.B. (31 January 1947 – 21 August 1950), resigned
- Segundo García Fernández, S.D.B. (21 August 1950 – 7 May 1953 see below)

Apostolic Vicars of Puerto Ayacucho

- Segundo García Fernández, S.D.B. (see above 7 May 1953 – 5 October 1974), resigned
- Enzo Ceccarelli Catraro, S.D.B. (5 Octotber 1974 – 23 October 1989), resigned
- Ignacio Velasco, S.D.B. (23 October 1989 – 27 May 1995), appointed Archbishop of Caracas, Santiago de Venezuela
- José Ángel Divassón, S.D.B. (23 February 1996 – 14 October 2015), retired
- Jonny Eduardo Reyes Sequera, S.D.B. (14 October 2015 – Present)

== See also ==
- Roman Catholicism in Venezuela
