= Diocese of San Carlos =

Diocese of San Carlos may refer to one of the following Latin Catholic dioceses:

- Diocese of San Carlos (Philippines)
- Diocese of San Carlos de Ancud, in Chile
- Diocese of San Carlos de Bariloche, in Argentina
- Diocese of San Carlos de Venezuela
