= Pro-Cathedral of Our Lady of Fatima, Ciudad Guayana =

Pro-Cathedral of Our Lady of Fatima
- Pro-catedral de Nuestra Señora de Fátima
- Pro-Cathedral of Our Lady of Fatima
- Location: Ciudad Guayana
- Country: Venezuela
- Denomination: Roman Catholic Church

Administration
- Diocese: Roman Catholic Diocese of Ciudad Guayana

The Pro-Cathedral of Our Lady of Fatima (Spanish: Pro-catedral de Nuestra Señora de Fátima) Also Ciudad Guayana Pro-Cathedral is a religious building belonging to the Catholic Church and serves as the temporary cathedral or pro-cathedral of the Diocese of Ciudad Guayana in Ciudad Guayana (Dioecesis Civitatis guayanensis) in Puerto Ordaz, close to Guayana Avenue, part of Ciudad Guayana in Bolívar state in the east of the South American country of Venezuela.

As its name implies was dedicated to the Virgin Mary in her title of Our Lady of Fatima, which is very popular both in Portugal and Venezuela. This under the pastoral care of Bishop Mariano José Parra Sandoval. The church was elevated to the status of pro-cathedral on August 20, 1979 by the then Pope John Paul II by the bull Cun Nos. The temple was visited by the pope himself on 29 January 1985, during his tour of several regions inside Venezuela.

There is a monument dedicated to John Paul II around the building.

== See also ==
- List of cathedrals in Venezuela
- Roman Catholicism in Venezuela
- St. John Paul II Cathedral, Ciudad Guayana
