= Archdiocese of Ciudad Bolívar =

Latin Catholic archdiocese in Venezuela

Coordinates: 8.1436°N 63.5513°W

Archdiocese of Ciudad Bolívar Archidioecesis Civitatis Bolivarensis

Catholic
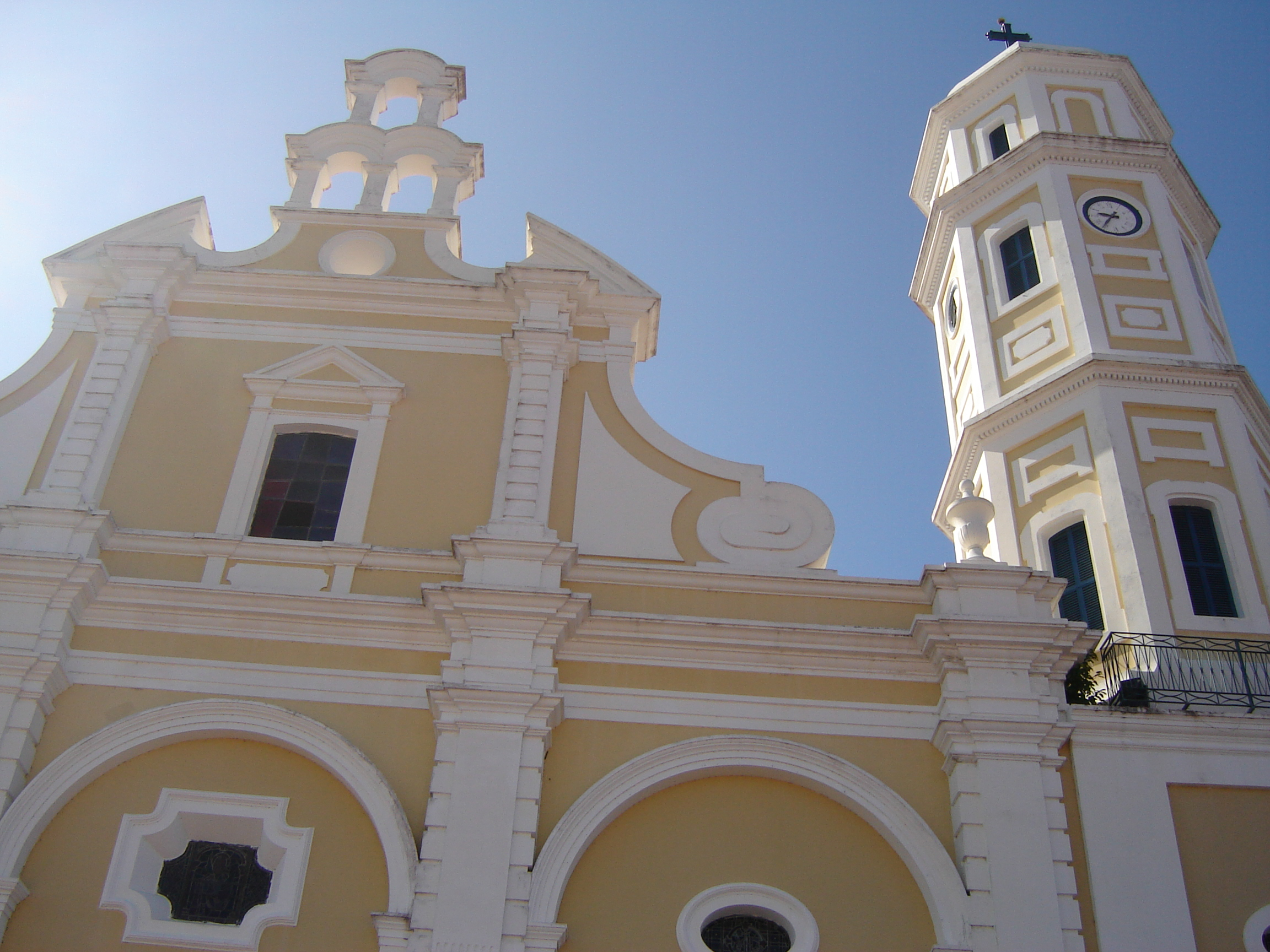
- Cathedral of St. Thomas

Location
- Country: Venezuela

Statistics
- Area: 109,769 km^{2} (42,382 sq mi)
- Population: Total; Catholics: (as of 2006); 570,000; 547,000 (96.0%)

Information
- Denomination: Catholic Church
- Sui iuris church: Latin Church
- Rite: Roman Rite
- Established: 20 May 1790 (236 years ago)
- Cathedral: St. Thomas Cathedral

Current leadership
- Pope: Leo XIV
- Archbishop: Ulises Antonio Gutiérrez Reyes, O. de M.

Map

The Archdiocese of Ciudad Bolívar (Latin: Civitatis Bolivaren(sis)) is a Latin Church archdiocese of the Catholic Church located in the city of Ciudad Bolívar in Venezuela. Established on 20 May 1790, it became part of the ecclesiastical province of the Archdiocese of Caracas. On 21 June 1958 it was elevated the diocese to the rank of metropolitan archdiocese.

== History ==
=== Diocese ===
The Diocese of Guayana, or Santo Tomás de Guayana, was erected on 20 May 1790, deriving its territory from the diocese of Puerto Rico (currently the archdiocese of San Juan). The original territory of the diocese included the mainland provinces of Guayana and Cumaná, as well as the island provinces of Trinidad and Margarita, in the captaincy general of Venezuela. The seat of the diocese was the city of Angostura (currently Ciudad Bolívar) also known as Santo Tomé de Guayana. Its first bishop was Francisco Ibarra Herrera from 19 December 1791 until 14 December 798, when he was named bishop of Caracas.

Originally a suffragan of the Archdiocese of Santo Domingo, on 24 November 1803, per the In universalis Ecclesiae regimine bull of Pope Pius VII it became part of the ecclesiastical province of the Archdiocese of Caracas.

On 4 March 1922, it ceded a portion of its territory for the erection of the Apostolic Vicariate of Caroní through the Quoties Romani bull of Pope Pius XI, and on 12 October of the same year it ceded a portion of its territory for the erection of the diocese of Cumaná (nowadays the Archdiocese of Cumaná) through the Ad munus papal bull. On 5 February 1932, another portion of its territory was ceded for the erection of the Apostolic Prefecture of the Upper Orinoco (currently the Apostolic Vicariate of Puerto Ayacucho) through the Quo melius decree of the Consistorial Congregation.

On 2 January 1953, following the Apostolicis sub plumbo Litteris decree of the Consistorial Congregation, it assumed the name of diocese of Ciudad Bolívar. On 7 June 1954, the Summa Dei bull of Pope Pius XII ceded a portion of its territory for the erection of the diocese of Barcelona (currently the Archdiocese of Barcelona).

On July 30, 1954, the Post latum decree of the Congregation of Propaganda Fide exchanged its territory with the apostolic vicariate of Caroní, receiving the parishes of Upata, San Félix, El Palmar, Guasipati, El Callao and Tumeremo, and transferring the territory west of the Paragua River which is in the basin of the Caroní River.

On May 24, 1958 it ceded another portion of its territory for the erection of the Diocese of Maturín through the Regnum Dei Bull of Pope Pius XII.

=== Archdiocese ===
On 21 June 1958 the Magna quidem bull of Pope Pius XII elevated the diocese to the rank of metropolitan archdiocese.

On 20 August 1979 the Cum nos Domini Nostri mandato bull of Pope John Paul II ceded another portion of its territory for the erection of the diocese of Ciudad Guayana. On 25 March 1988 it ceded the municipalities of Piar, Roscio and Sifontes for a substantial modification of the diocesan limits through the Quo aptius decree of the Congregation for Bishops.

== Bishops ==
=== Ordinaries ===
- Francisco de Ibarra y Herrera † (19 Dec 1791 – 14 Dec 1798) Appointed, Bishop of Caracas
- José Antonio García Mohedano † (11 Aug 1800 – 17 Oct 1804)
- Mariano Talavera y Garcés † (22 Dec 1828 – 1842)
- Mariano Fernández Fortique † (12 Jul 1841 – 6 Feb 1854)
- José Manuel Arroyo y Niño † (19 Jun 1856 – 30 Nov 1884)
- Manuel Felipe Rodríguez Delgado † (30 Jul 1885 – 13 Dec 1887)
- Antonio María Durán † (25 Sep 1891 – 18 Jul 1917)
- Sixto Sosa Díaz † (5 Dec 1918 – 16 Jun 1923) Appointed, Bishop of Cumaná
- Miguel Antonio Mejía † (22 Jun 1923 – 6 Oct 1947)
- Juan José Bernal Ortiz † (21 Oct 1949 – 25 Jul 1965) Appointed, Archbishop (Personal Title) of Los Teques
- Crisanto Darío Mata Cova † (30 Apr 1966 – 26 May 1986)
- Medardo Luis Luzardo Romero † (26 May 1986 – 27 Aug 2011)
- Ulises Antonio Gutiérrez Reyes, O. de M. (27 Aug 2011 – present)

=== Auxiliary bishops ===
- Tomás Enrique Márquez Gómez (1963–1966), appointed Bishop of San Felipe
- Francisco de Guruceaga Iturriza (1967–1969), appointed Bishop of Margarita
- José de Jesús Nuñez Viloria (1982–1987), appointed Bishop of Ciudad Guayana

== Suffragan dioceses ==
- Ciudad Guayana
- Maturín

== See also ==
- Catholic Church in Venezuela

== Sources ==
- GCatholic.org
- Catholic Hierarchy ^{[self-published]}
