= Kneiss =

Islands belonging to Tunisia

Coordinates: 34°21′2″N 10°17′59″E

Designations

Ramsar Wetland
- Official name: Iles Kneiss avec leurs zones intertidales
- Designated: 7 November 2007
- Reference no.: 1704

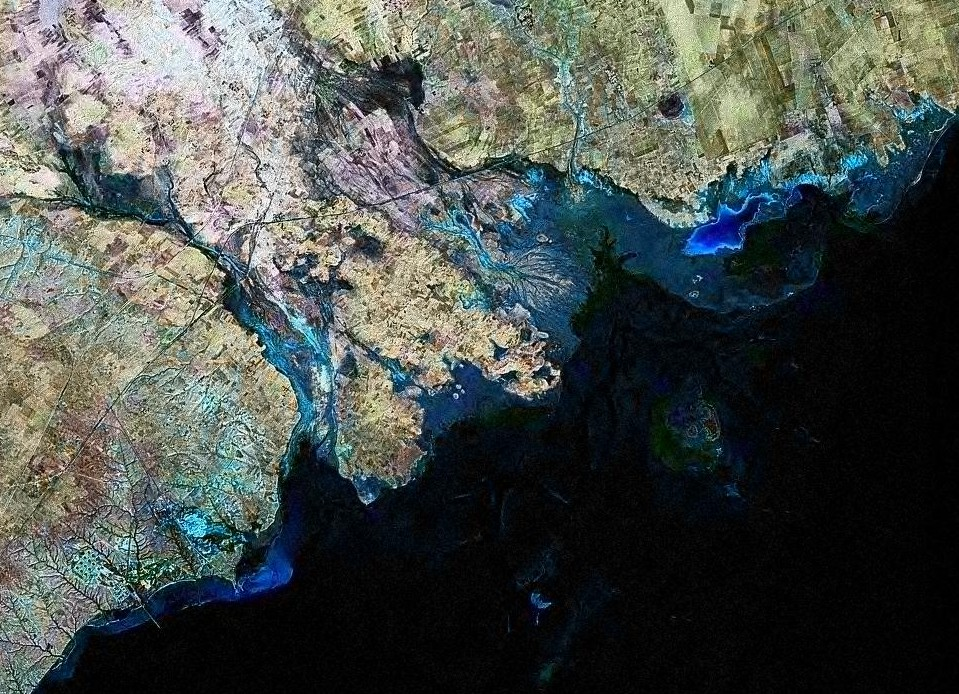
Satellite image of Kneiss Islands

Kneiss (Arabic: أرخبيل الكنائس) is an archipelago of small Islands in the Gulf of Gabes, located a few kilometers offshore of Tunisia, about 50 km south of Sfax.

Their names come from the plural form of the word knissa ([Christian] "church" in Tunisian Arabic) as the central island still bears archeological remains that correspond to Cenae, the monastery where Fulgentius of Ruspe relocated around the years 503 to 505 AD^{,}.

== Geography ==
In the 21st century, four Kneiss islands are emerging in a shoal area of 15km length over 10km width: The larger island of 2.5km diameter roughly circular shape is located in the North-East and named Dzirat el Bessila. The other 3 are islets on a South-South West axis: Dzirat el Hajar "the island of the rock" more North, Dzirat el Laboua "the island of the mud" in the middle and Dzirat el Gharbia "the Western island" the most South-West.

The existence of at least one "deserted and uninhabited" island is mentioned in the Greek Periplus of Pseudo-Scylax. In the Middle age, on Catalan Portolan charts, such as those of Gabriel de Vallseca, what are today 3 islets appear as only one elongated island and the Kneiss are called Frixols. The islands are collectively referred to on Arabic maps as Surkenis i.e. the "wall-of-Kneiss" because the string of islands with their surrounding mudflats constitutes a "wall" to higher waves and protects the bay to the West.

== Environment ==
The vast expanse of mudflats (14,500 ha) and shallow water are an important bird habitat and are protected under the Ramsar convention. The offshore islands, along with the intertidal mudflats, the shoreline and the semi-desert grasslands of the adjacent mainland coast, have been designated an Important Bird Area (IBA) by BirdLife International because they support significant populations of wintering waterbirds and resident passerines.
