= St. Thomas Cathedral, Ciudad Bolívar =

Coordinates: 8.1438°N 63.5511°W

St. Thomas Cathedral
- Catedral de Santo Tomás
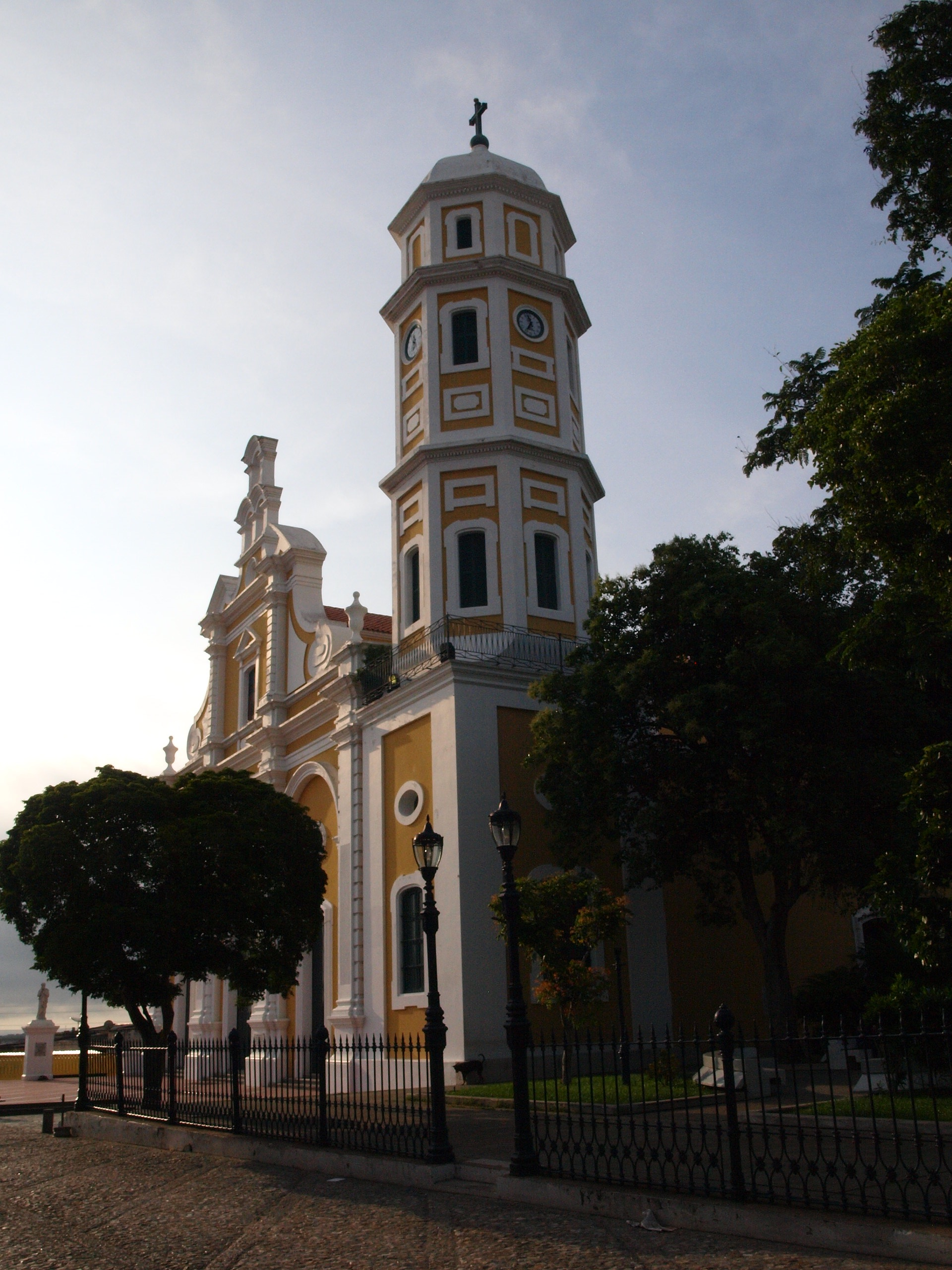
- St. Thomas Cathedral
- Location: Ciudad Bolívar
- Country: Venezuela
- Denomination: Roman Catholic Church

The Cathedral of St. Thomas (Spanish: Catedral de Santo Tomás de Ciudad Bolívar), also called Ciudad Bolívar Cathedral, is the cathedral of the Roman Catholic Archdiocese of Ciudad Bolívar. It is located opposite Bolívar Square in Ciudad Bolívar, capital of Bolívar State in the Guayana region in southern Venezuela.

It had previously served as the cathedral of the Diocese of Santo Tomas de Guiana, created in 1790 by Pope Pius VI with the support of King Charles IV of Spain. The city at the time was known as San Tomás de la Nueva Guayana.

The church building was not completed until 1841. It was formally consecrated in 1896, and between 1966 and 1986 was modified to suit the original plans. Its tower has a height of 44 meters and has a sculpture dedicated to St. Thomas.

The Archdiocese of Ciudad Bolívar (Archidioecesis Civitatis bolivarensis) was elevated to the status of metropolitan archdiocese by bull Magna quidemof Pope Pius XII on June 21, 1958, and St. Thomas' was designated the seat of the archbishop at that time.

== See also ==
- Catholic Church in Venezuela
- List of cathedrals in Venezuela
