= Diocese of San Carlos de Venezuela =

Roman Catholic diocese in Venezuela

Diocese of San Carlos de Venezuela Dioecesis Sancti Caroli in Venetiola

Catholic

Location
- Country: Venezuela
- Ecclesiastical province: Valencia in Venezuela

Statistics
- Area: 14,800 km^{2} (5,700 sq mi)
- Population: Total; Catholics: (as of 2004); 268,654; 258,090 (96.1%)

Information
- Rite: Latin Rite
- Established: 16 May 1972 (54 years ago)
- Cathedral: Catedral de la Inmaculada Concepción

Current leadership
- Pope: Leo XIV
- Bishop: Alexander Rivera Vielma
- Bishops emeritus: Jesús Tomás Zárraga Colmenares; Polito Rodríguez Méndez

Map

The Roman Catholic Diocese of San Carlos de Venezuela (Latin: Dioecesis Sancti Caroli in Venetiola) is a diocese located in the city of San Carlos in the ecclesiastical province of Valencia en Venezuela in Venezuela.

== History ==
On 16 May 1972 Pope Paul VI established the Diocese of San Carlos de Venezuela from Diocese of Valencia.

== Ordinaries ==
- Medardo Luis Luzardo Romero † (16 May 1972 – 20 Aug 1979) Appointed, Bishop of Ciudad Guayana
- Antonio Arellano Durán † (3 Jun 1980 – 27 Dec 2002)
- Jesús Tomás Zárraga Colmenares (27 Dec 2002 – 2014)
- Polito Rodríguez Méndez (8 Apr 2016 – 27 May 2025)
- Alexander Rivera Vielma (since 27 May 2025)

== See also ==
- Roman Catholicism in Venezuela

== Sources ==
- GCatholic.org
- Catholic Hierarchy ^{[self-published]}
