= Guarenas Cathedral =

Our Lady of Copacabana Cathedral
- Catedral de Nuestra Señora de Copacabana de Guarenas
- Our Lady of Copacabana Cathedral
- Location: Guarenas
- Country: Venezuela
- Denomination: Roman Catholic Church

Administration
- Diocese: Roman Catholic Diocese of Guarenas

The Our Lady of Copacabana Cathedral (Spanish: Catedral de Nuestra Señora de Copacabana de Guarenas) or simply Cathedral of Guarenas, is a religious building belonging to the Catholic Church and is located at Ambrosio Plaza Street on one side of the Bolívar Square, in the city of Guarenas, a city in the municipality Ambrosio Plaza, Miranda state, which serves as a "satellite city" of Caracas, in the South American country of Venezuela. It has objects and relics of great historical and religious value.

The first church on the site was built in rudimentary form in 1621. It was hit by an earthquake in 1766. In the early nineteenth century was rebuilt to make it much larger. in 1950 he became a major refurbishment with plans of Oreste Giovanni Della Piana. In January 1997 it is recognized as the Cathedral of the Diocese of Guarenas (Dioecesis Guarenensis) by decision of Pope John Paul II by the bull Maiori christifidelium.

As its name indicates is dedicated to the Virgin Mary in her title of Our Lady of Copacabana, whose veneration has its origins in the territory that today is Bolivia and spread throughout Spanish America from 1583.

== See also ==
- Basilica of Our Lady of Copacabana
- Catholic Church in Venezuela
- List of cathedrals in Venezuela
- Our Lady of Copacabana
