= Cenae =

Diocese of Cene

Africa Proconsularis

The diocese of Cene (Latin: Dioecesis Cenensis) is a suppressed and titular see of the Roman Catholic Church.

Cenae, identifiable with the island of Kneiss in today's Tunisia, are an ancient bishopric of the Roman province of Mauretania Caesariensis. There are only two bishops, Bonifacius and Vindemius, who took part in the 411 Carthaginian conference, which saw the Catholic baptists and donatists of Africa together.

In the life of Saint Fulgentius (6th century), the monk Ferrandus remembers that the saint retired to a monastery on the island. Archaeological excavations conducted in 1941 brought to light evidence and finds identifiable with this monastery.

Today the diocese survives as a titular see, and the current bishop is Sergi Gordo Rodríguez, auxiliary bishop of Barcelona.

== Known bishops ==
- Bonifacius (fl.411)
- Vindemius (fl.411) (Donatist)
- Antoon van Oorschoot (1949–1953)
- John Joseph Scanlan (1954–1968)
- John Joseph Fitzpatrick (1968–1971)
- John Robert Roach (1971–1975)
- Carlos Alberto Etchandy Gimeno Navarro (1975–1981)
- José de Jesús Núñez Viloria (1982–1987)
- Amédée Grab (1987–1995)
- Amancio Escapa Aparicio (1996–2017)
- Sergi Gordo Rodríguez (2017–current)
