= Our Lady of Corteza Cathedral =

- Catedral de Nuestra Señora de la Corteza
- Our Lady of Corteza Cathedral
- Location: Acarigua
- Country: Venezuela
- Denomination: Roman Catholic Church

The Our Lady of Corteza Cathedral (Spanish: Catedral de Nuestra Señora de la Corteza) also called Cathedral of Acarigua-Araure, or Parish Cathedral of Our Lady of Corteza is a religious building belonging to the Catholic Church and is located in the city of Acarigua-Araure in Portuguesa state in the plains region South American country of Venezuela.

It serves as the seat of the diocese of Acarigua (Dioecesis Acariguaruensis) that was created on December 27, 2002, with the papal bull Ad satius consulendum of Pope John Paul II.

Between 2007 and 2011 it underwent a restoration process that was made possible by contributions from Catholics and private enterprise. As its name indicates it was dedicated to the Virgin Mary in her title of Our Lady of Corteza, whose appearance Catholics believe it came in a trunk on February 11, 1702, when Venezuela was still a Spanish colony. The veneration of the Virgin of bark had ecclesiastical approval only from 1757.

== See also ==
- Caracas Cathedral
- List of cathedrals in Venezuela
- Roman Catholicism in Venezuela
