= Cerro El Toro (Upata) =

Coordinates: 8°01′N 62°24′W

Cerro El Toro is a mountain in northwest side of Upata, Venezuela. It has a height of 425 metres.
