= St. John Paul II Cathedral, Ciudad Guayana =

St. John Paul II Cathedral
- Catedral de San Juan Pablo II
- St. John Paul II Cathedral
- Location: Ciudad Guayana
- Country: Venezuela
- Denomination: Roman Catholic Church

The St. John Paul II Cathedral (Spanish: Catedral de San Juan Pablo II) Also Ciudad Guayana Cathedral is the name given to a project on construction of a religious building belonging to the Catholic Church and is located in the UD-251 area of Puerto Ordaz in the city of Ciudad Guayana, the largest population of Bolivar State, in the Guayana region in the southern part of the South American country of Venezuela.

It has the name of pope John Paul II because in the land where the cathedral is built, a Mass attended by the pope in 1985. Since then the place was known as the "Cross of the Pope" was held. In 1986, the Corporación Venezolana de Guayana custom design architects of the cathedral, and in 1997 was established as a Foundation. The state government collaborated with the construction from 2001 to 2005. The economic problems delayed its opening.

Since 2012 the foundation seeks funding for completion in 2015 the work of its first stage was completed in June. However, there are still three more stages for its inauguration resumed. Only 45% of the project has been built.

Once completed take the functions of the pro-cathedral of Our Lady of Fatima current temporary headquarters of the Roman Catholic Diocese of Ciudad Guayana.

== See also ==
- Roman Catholicism in Venezuela
- St. John Paul II Church
