= All Saints Cathedral, Calabozo =

Coordinates: 8.9342°N 67.4275°W

All Saints Cathedral
- Catedral de Todos Los Santos de Calabozo
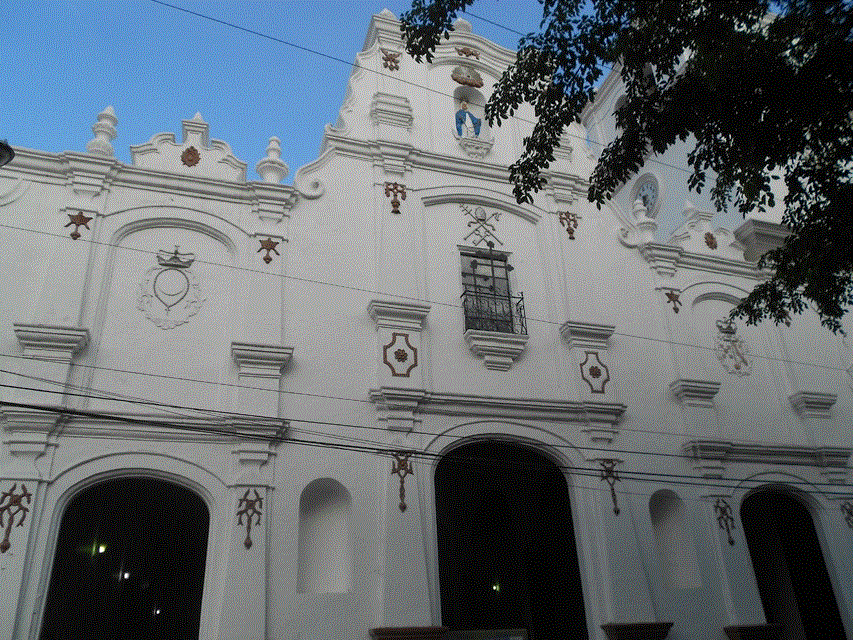
- All Saints Cathedral
- Location: Calabozo
- Country: Venezuela
- Denomination: Roman Catholic Church

The All Saints Cathedral (Spanish: Catedral de Todos Los Santos de Calabozo) or Metropolitan Cathedral of Calabozo is a baroque cathedral located in Calabozo, Guárico State, Venezuela.

The cathedral was established the day of the founding of Calabozo, on 1 February 1724, as regards Lucas Guillermo Castillo Lara in his book on the village of All Saints of Calabozo (Villa de Todos los Santos de Calabozo): "Father Cadiz blessed in God's name to land that received them and the men who peopled". All proclaimed one will be founded on behalf of the Royal Majesty; after Friar accompanied by the villagers planted a simple cross to secure the site of the future church, traced to string the rectangle of the square, he outlined the four first streets and distributed the twelve first solar until April 1729 when, during the visit of Bishop Juan José Calatayud, as such was built between 1754 and 1790 to slow its construction. The construction of the Second parish church begins, but in the twentieth century when the dome was built with the clock currently is icon of the city, and one of the most important of the Venezuelan state.

== See also ==
- List of cathedrals in Venezuela
- Roman Catholicism in Venezuela
