= Mudflat =

Coastal wetlands where sediments have been deposited by tides or rivers

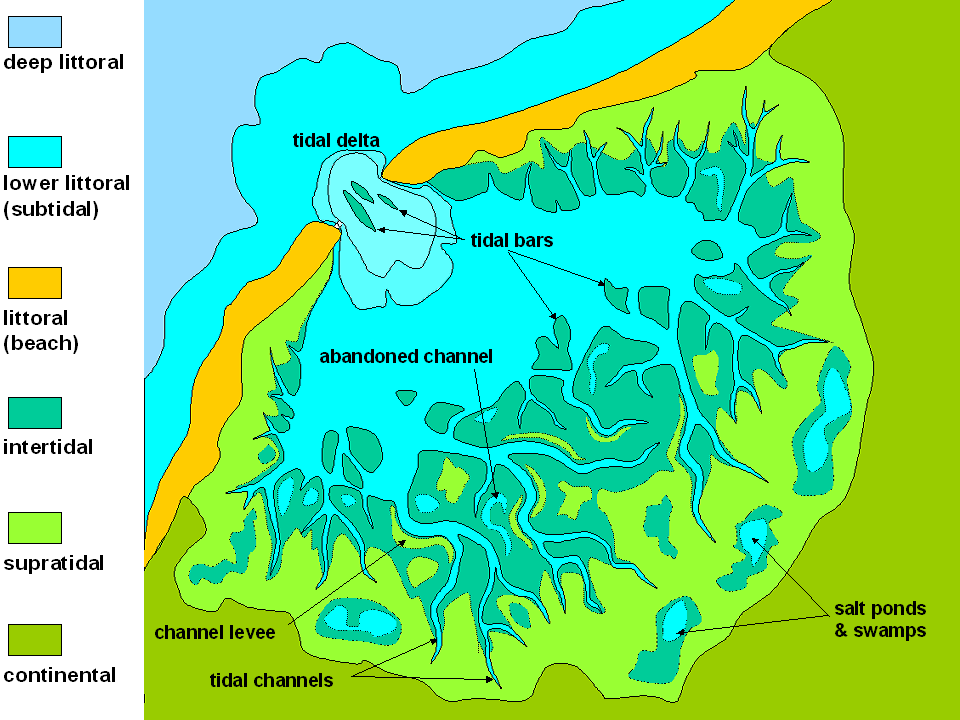
General sketch-map of a tidal plain, showing the typical tripartition in supratidal, intertidal and subtidal zones. The most apparent character of the area is the development of tidal channels, affecting mainly the intertidal zone. In this case, the tidal flat is protected seaward by a beach barrier, but in many cases (low-energy waves and longshore currents) the tidal flats may directly pass into a shallow marine environment.

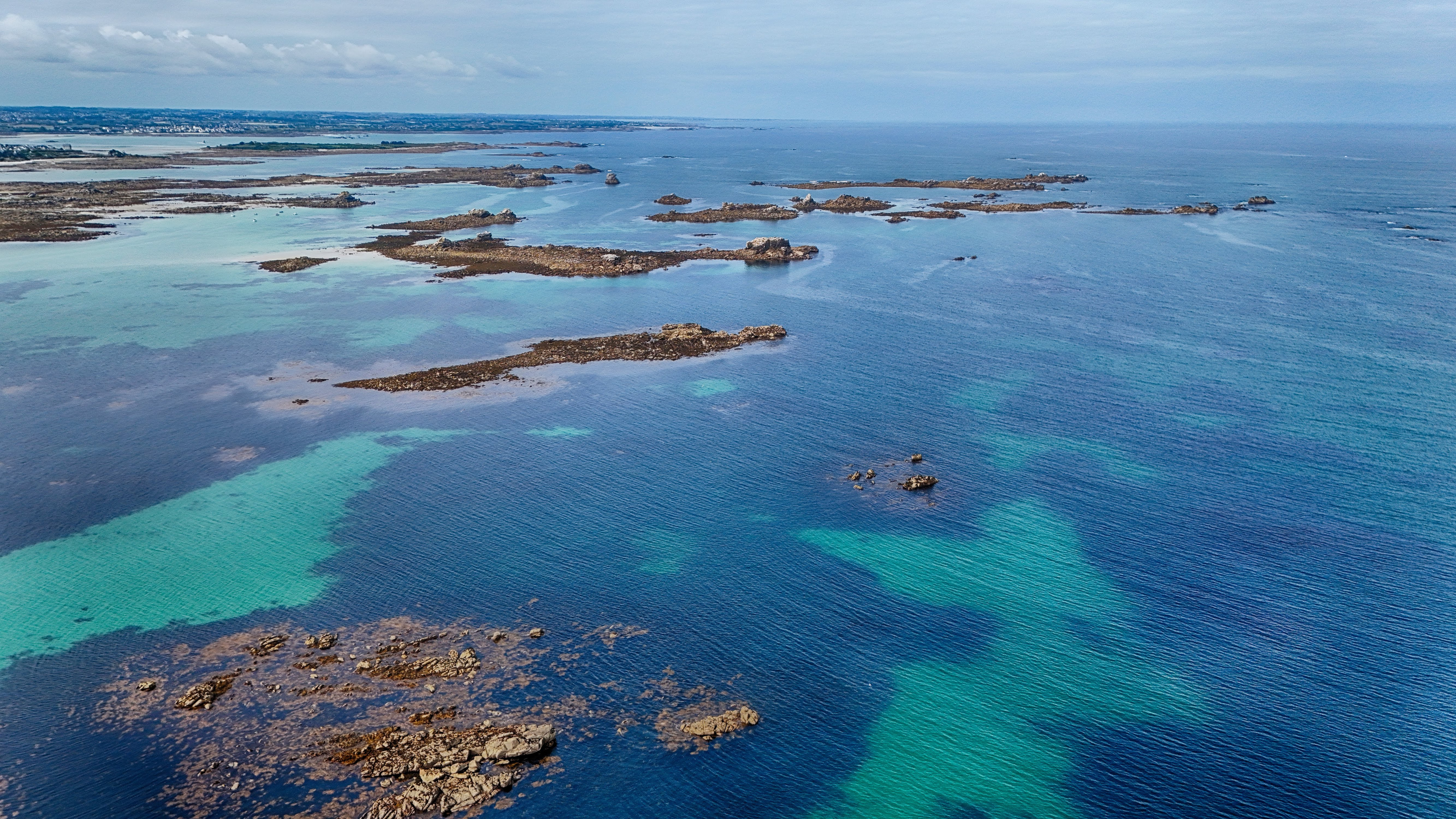
Aerial view of rocky tidal flats off the coast of Roscoff, Brittany, France

Mudflats or mud flats, also known as tidal flats or, in Ireland, slob or slobs, are coastal wetlands that form in intertidal areas where sediments have been deposited by tides or rivers. A global analysis published in 2019 suggested that tidal flat ecosystems are as extensive globally as mangroves, covering at least 127,921 km^{2} (49,391 mi^{2}) of the Earth's surface. They are found in sheltered areas such as bays, bayous, lagoons, and estuaries; they are also seen in freshwater lakes and salty lakes (or inland seas) alike, wherein many rivers and creeks end. Mudflats may be viewed geologically as exposed layers of bay mud, resulting from deposition of estuarine silts, clays and aquatic animal detritus. Most of the sediment within a mudflat is within the intertidal zone, and thus the flat is submerged and exposed approximately twice daily.

A recent global remote sensing analysis estimated that approximately 50% of the global extent of tidal flats occurs within eight countries (Indonesia, China, Australia, United States, Canada, India, Brazil, and Myanmar) and that 44% of the world's tidal flats occur within Asia (56,051 km^{2} or 21,641 mi^{2}). A 2022 analysis of tidal wetland losses and gains estimates that global tidal flats experienced losses of 7,000 km^{2} (2,700 mi^{2}) between 1999 and 2019, which were largely offset by global gains of 6,700 km^{2} (2,600 mi^{2}) over the same time period.

In the past tidal flats were considered economically unimportant areas and were often dredged and developed into agricultural land. Some mudflats can be extremely treacherous to walk on. For example, the mudflats surrounding Anchorage, Alaska, are made from fine glacial-silt which does not easily separate out its water, and, although seemingly solid, can quickly gel and become like quicksand when disturbed by stepping on it. Four people are known to have become stuck up to their waists and drowned when the tide came in, and many others are rescued from the Anchorage mudflats each year.

On the Baltic Sea coast of Germany in places, mudflats are exposed not by tidal action, but by wind-action driving water away from the shallows into the sea. This kind of wind-affected mudflat is called Windwatt in German.

== Ecology ==
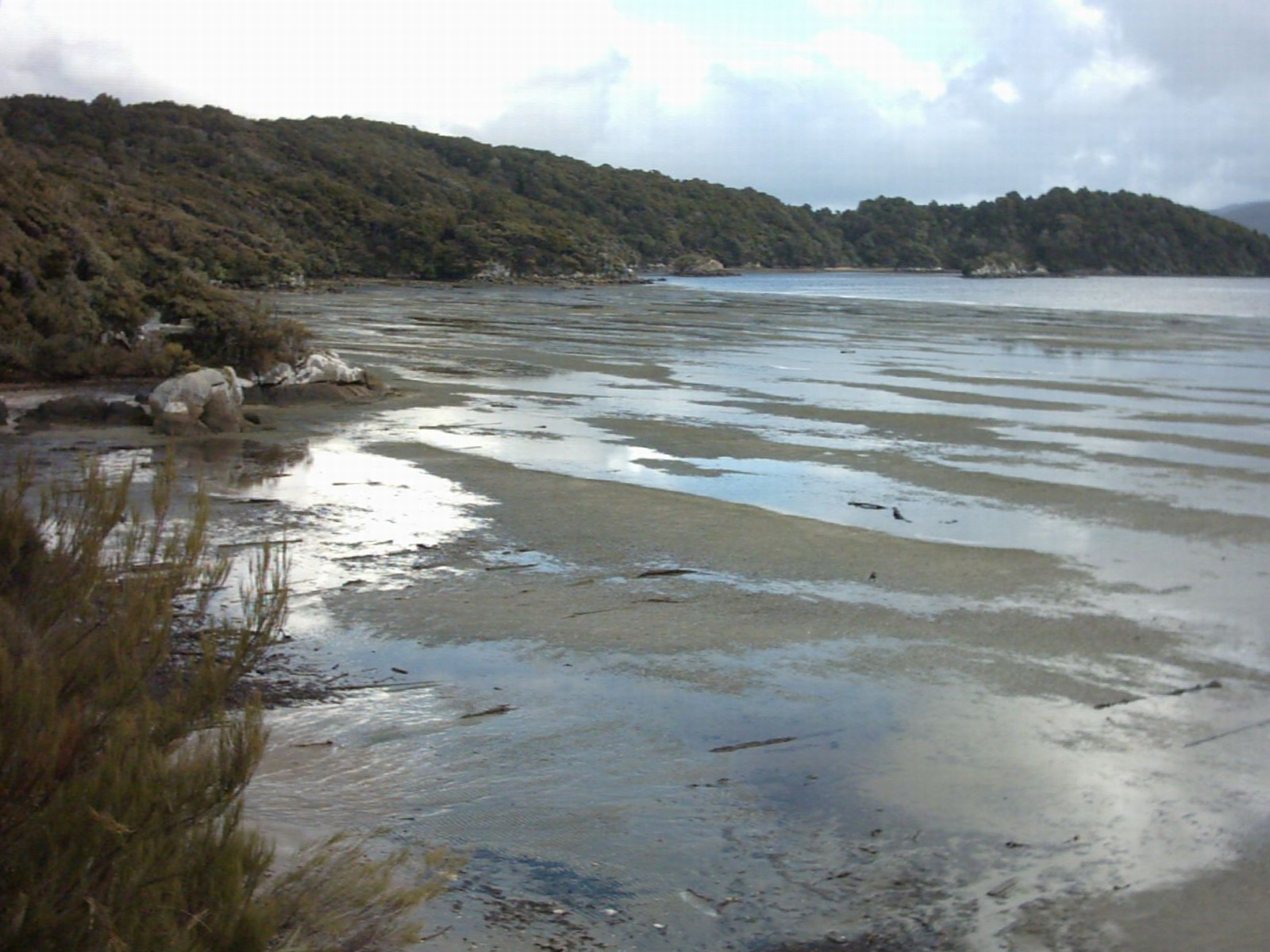
Mudflats near Oban on Stewart Island, New Zealand

Tidal flats, along with intertidal salt marshes and mangrove forests, are important ecosystems. They support a large population of wildlife, and are a key habitat that allows tens of millions of migratory shorebirds to migrate from breeding sites in the northern hemisphere to non-breeding areas in the southern hemisphere. They are often of vital importance to migratory birds, as well as certain species of crabs, mollusks and fish. In the United Kingdom mudflats have been classified as a Biodiversity Action Plan priority habitat.

The maintenance of mudflats is important in preventing coastal erosion. However, mudflats worldwide are under threat from predicted sea level rises, land claims for development, dredging due to shipping purposes, and chemical pollution. In some parts of the world, such as East and South-East Asia, mudflats have been reclaimed for aquaculture, agriculture, and industrial development. For example, around the Yellow Sea region of East Asia, more than 65% of mudflats present in the early 1950s had been destroyed by the late 2000s. It is estimated that up to 16% of the world tidal flats have disappeared since the mid-1980s.

Mudflat sediment deposits are focused into the intertidal zone which is composed of a barren zone and marshes. Within these areas are various ratios of sand and mud that make up the sedimentary layers. The associated growth of coastal sediment deposits can be attributed to rates of subsidence along with rates of deposition (example: silt transported via river) and changes in sea level.

Barren zones extend from the lowest portion of the intertidal zone to the marsh areas. Beginning in close proximity to the tidal bars, sand dominated layers are prominent and become increasingly muddy throughout the tidal channels. Common bedding types include laminated sand, ripple bedding, and bay mud. Bioturbation also has a strong presence in barren zones.

Marshes contain an abundance of herbaceous plants while the sediment layers consist of thin sand and mud layers. Mudcracks are a common as well as wavy bedding planes. Marshes are also the origins of coal/peat layers because of the abundant decaying plant life. Salt pans can be distinguished in that they contain thinly laminated layers of clayey silt. The main source of the silt comes from rivers. Dried up mud along with wind erosion forms silt dunes. When flooding, rain or tides come in, the dried sediment is then re-distributed.

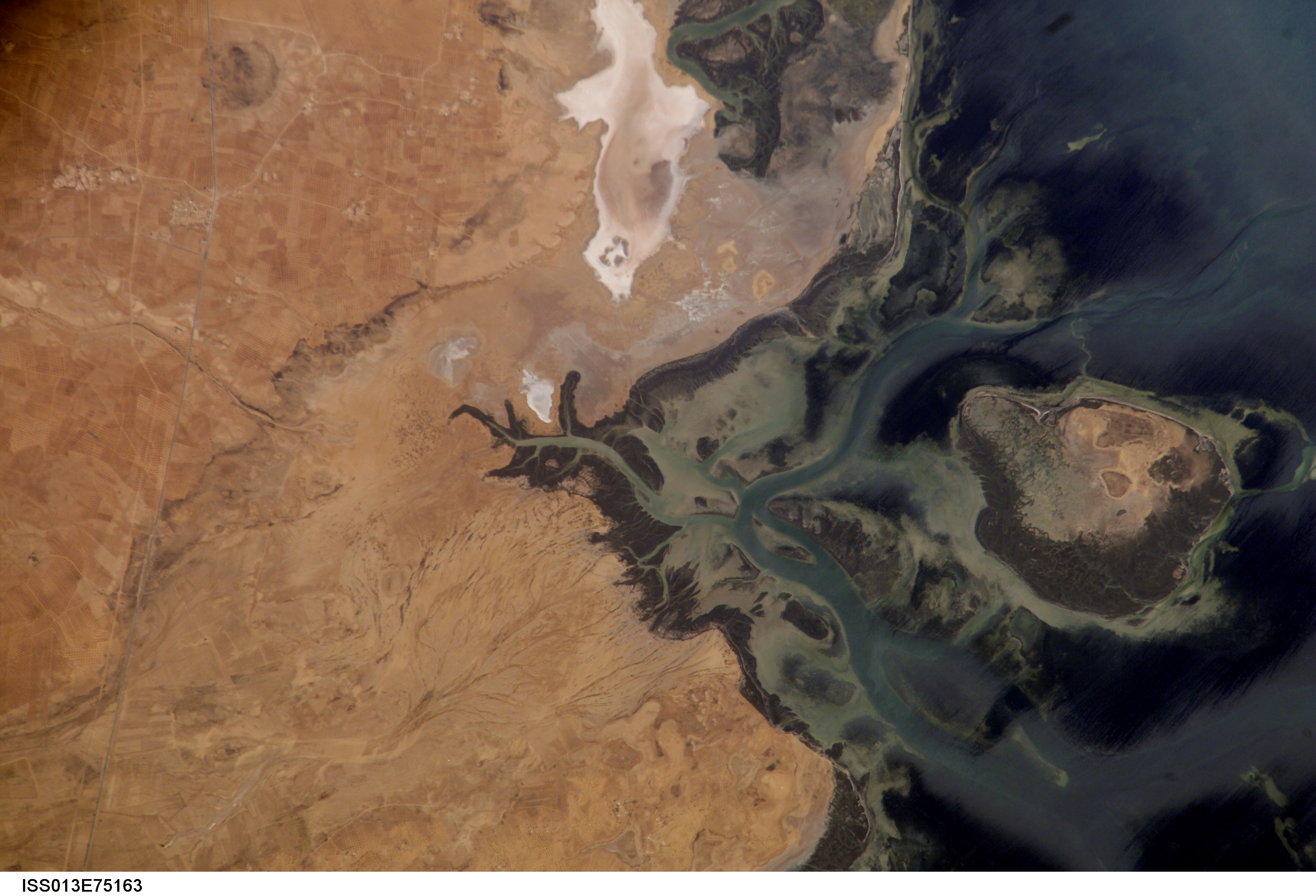
Satellite view of the Kneiss Islands, Tunisia.

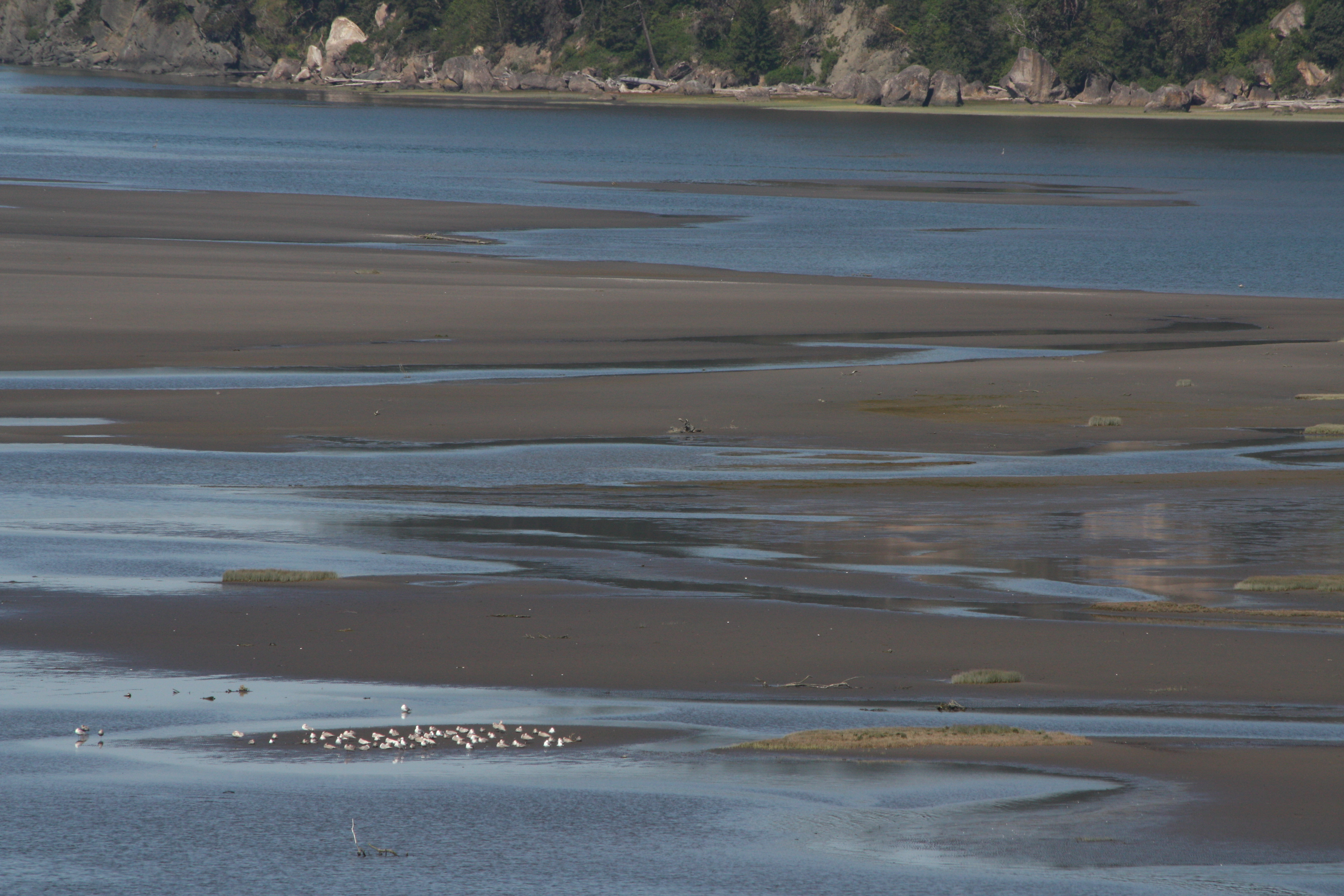
Gulls feeding on mudflats in Skagit Bay, Washington, United States

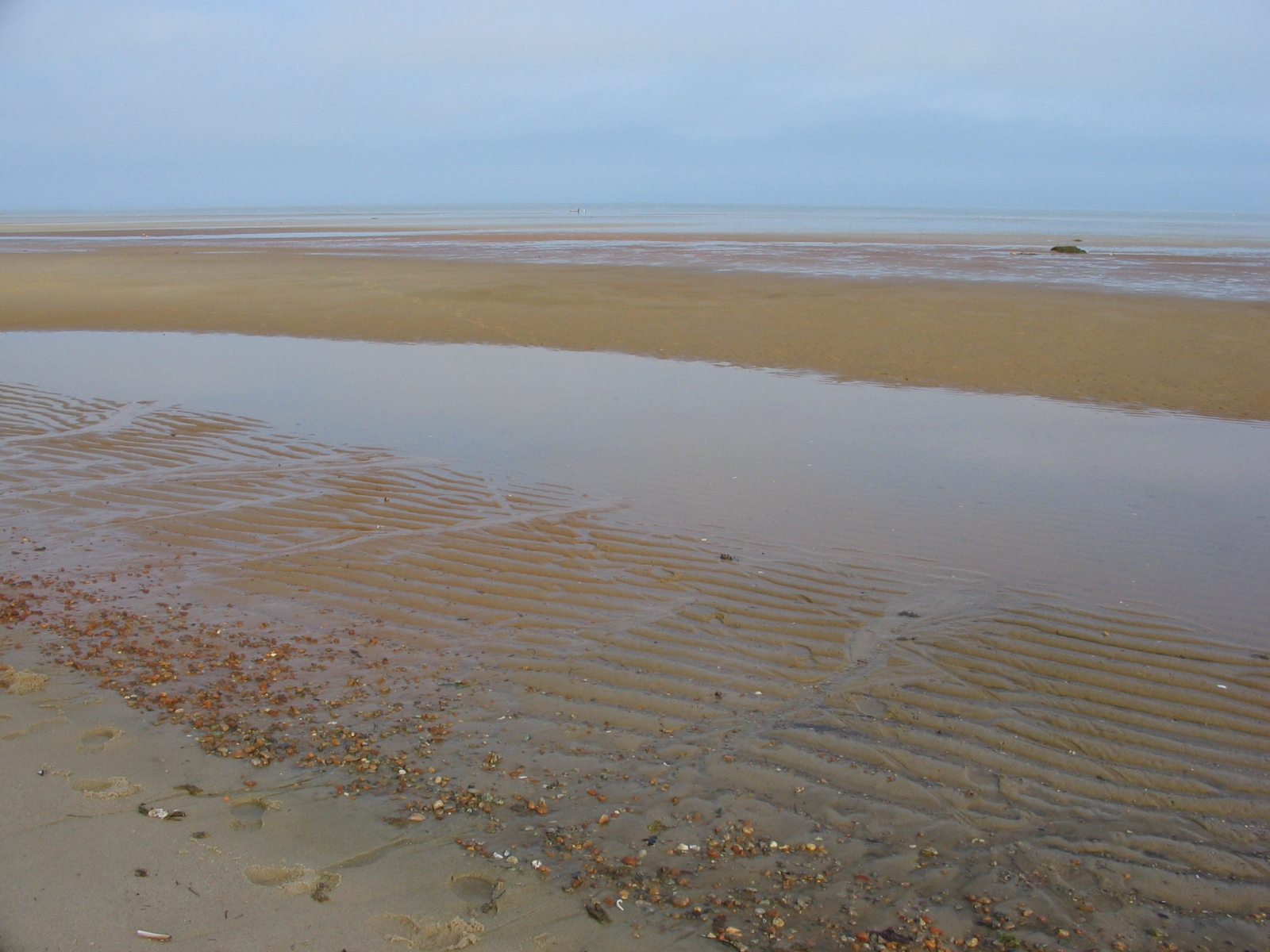
Mudflats in Brewster, Massachusetts, United States, extending hundreds of yards offshore at the low tide. The line of Wrack (seaweed) and seashells in the foreground indicates the high-water mark.

== Cultural Services ==
Tidal flats provide cultural services that reflect a sense of place, foster social interactions, and support well-being. Intergenerational practices of tidal flat gleaning and fishing are central to tidal flat-dependent communities. Hence, enabling cultural preservation and identity for the coastal communities, which are intricately linked with the tidal flats ecosystem.

== Selected example areas ==
- Arcachon Bay, France
- Banc d'Arguin, Mauritania
- Chamiza Wetland, Chile
- Great Rann of Kutch, India
- Belhaven, East Lothian Scotland, United Kingdom
- Bridgwater Bay and Morecambe Bay, United Kingdom
- Cape Cod Bay, Massachusetts, United States
- Cook Inlet, Alaska, United States
- Lindisfarne Island, England, United Kingdom
- Minas Basin, Nova Scotia, Canada
- Moreton Bay, Queensland, Australia
- North Slob, Wexford, Ireland
- Kneiss Archipelago, Tunisia
- Padilla Bay, Washington, United States
- Plymouth Bay, Massachusetts, United States
- Skagit Bay, Washington, United States
- Snettisham, Norfolk England, United Kingdom
- Wadden Sea: Netherlands, Germany, Denmark
- West coast of Andros Island, Bahamas
- Yellow Sea: China, North Korea, South Korea (Getbol)

== See also ==
- Getbol
- Herringbone cross beds
