= Upata =

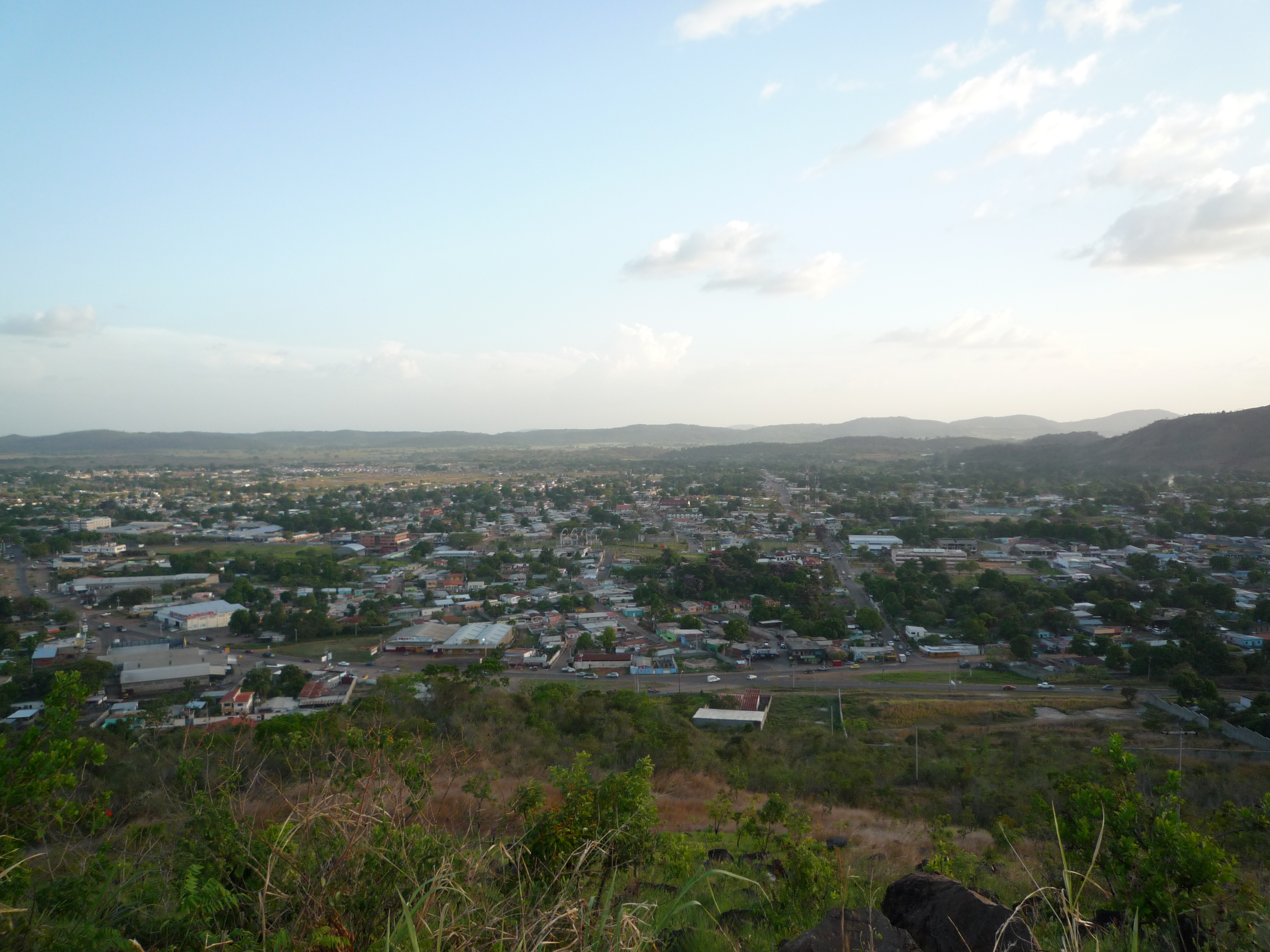
- Upata from Cerro La Virgen

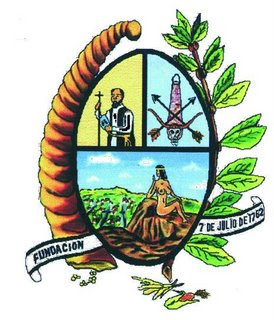
- Flag Coat of arms
- Nicknames: Villa del Youcoima ("Yocoima Village"); La capital de las mujeres bonitas ("Capital of the beautiful women")
- Motto: Ave María Santísima, sin pecado concebida, en el primer instante de su ser natural. ("Hail Holiest Mary, conceived without sin, in the first instant of Your Natural Being.")
- Location within Venezuela
- Coordinates: 8°1′0″N 62°24′0″W
- Country: Venezuela
- States: Bolívar
- Municipalities: Piar Municipality
- Founded: July 7, 1762

Government
  - Mayor: Ornella Valentina Arbelaez (PSUV)

Area
  - City: 1,930 km^{2} (750 sq mi)
- Elevation: 350 m (1,150 ft)

Population (2001)
  - Density: 1,431.5/km^{2} (3,708/sq mi)
  - Urban: 168,856
  - Demonym: Upatense
- Time zone: UTC−4 (VET)
- Postal code: 8052
- Area code: 288
- Climate: Aw

Upata (Spanish pronunciation: [uˈpata]) is a Venezuelan city inside the bulk of Guayana at the north of the Bolívar State. It is the capital and most important town of Piar Municipality. It is located between the basins of the rivers Orinoco and Cuyuní. The name of Upata is an indigenous word, probably of the Kamaracoto ethnic group, believed to mean “Rose of the mountain," name of a chief's daughter.

== Foundation ==
It is widely known that the first attempts to form the town of Upata came towards 1739. Nevertheless, it was on July 7, 1762 when Fray Antonio de Cervera founded the city with the name of "Village Yocoima of Saint Anthony of Padua" (Villa del Yocoima, de San Antonio de Padua)(Spanish), in honor to the Italian saint from Padua: Saint Anthony of Padua, when the Capucin missionaries brought the Catholic faith to the region.

== Geography ==
Upata is one of Venezuela's cities which has a large population of Europeans, many of them from Italy, France, Portugal and Spain. By the years 1945 and 1970 about 1,750 Italians, 650 Portuguese, and many other from Spain. Upata's population comprises 48% Whites, 40% Mestizo, 7% Blacks and 5% of Amerindian descent. In recent times have joined small groups of Asian immigrants, (China, Philippines), dedicated to commercial affairs. Some others from Colombia, Chile, Ecuador, Peru, Bolivia.

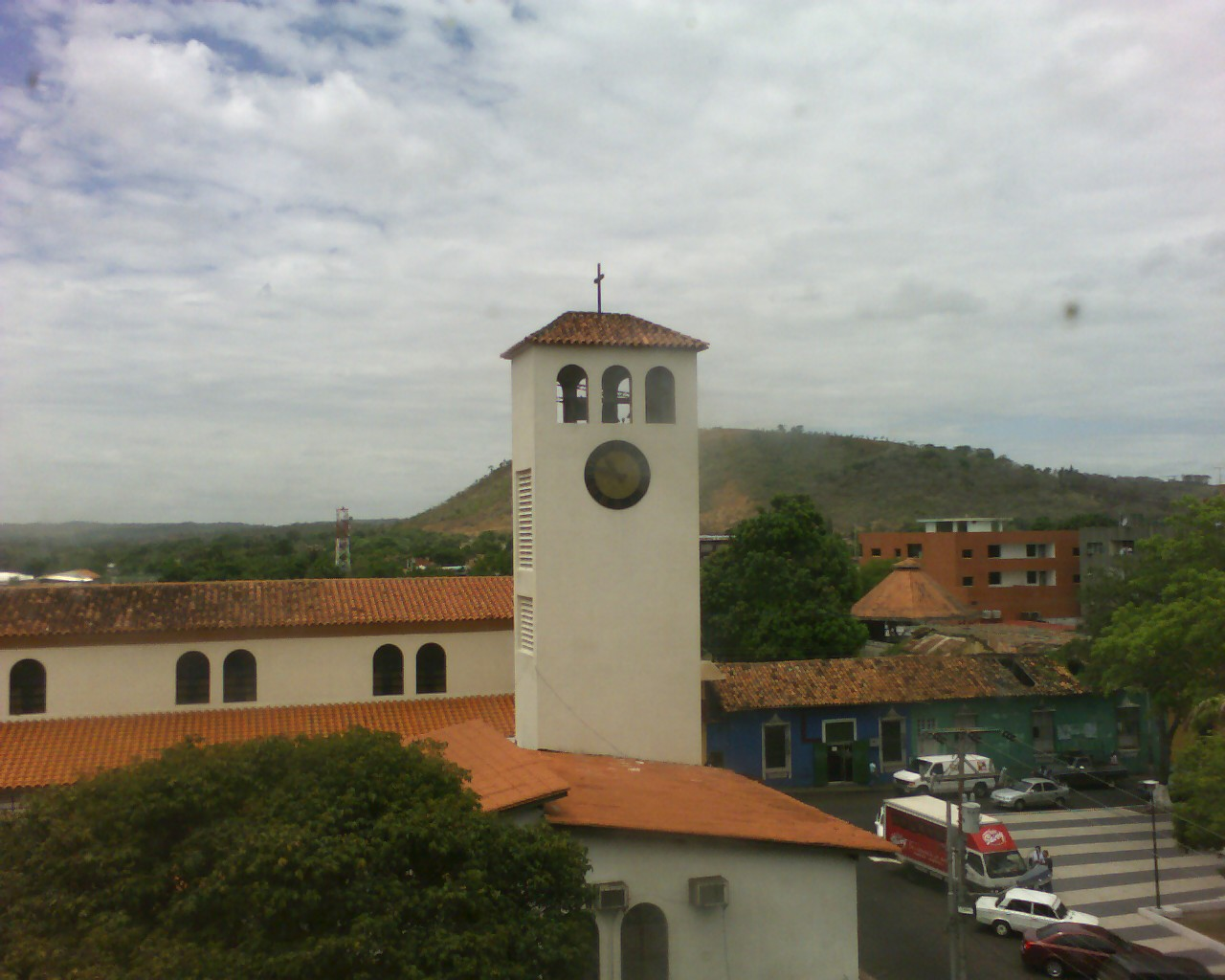
Upata's Catholic Church

Upata is the third largest city in the state of Bolívar and the capital of the Piar municipality, a jurisdiction that has an area of 15,899 km^{2}, of which 4,000 km^{2} belong to the Upata Capital Section and about 32 km^{2} to the urban perimeter of the city. It is located in the center and habitable corners of a longitudinal valley that extends about 20 kilometers long by 6 kilometers wide, from the sources of the Yocoima River in the Las Llaves El Candado sector, near the road to Guasipati, to the agricultural, livestock, savannah and forest areas of San Lorenzo, Santa Rosa, Sabanetica, La Armonía, La Carata, Laguna Larga Unión 2000.

The city is located between 340 and 360 meters above sea level and its climate is tropical rainy savannah. In the western or western fringe of the Piar municipality, on the border with the Angostura municipality, very close to Upata is the artificial lake caused by the construction of the Guri Hydroelectric Complex, while to the east from Upata you can see the foothills of the Sierra Imataca, rich in minerals, abundant in biodiversity, with land suitable for planting and agroecological tourism.

As for the soils, they are markedly acidic, with low to moderate natural fertility, since it is an area with a long weathering process, in which Quaternary soils, clays with a high content of bauxite, clay loam, and sandbanks in the savannah, on a metamorphic igneous basement, belonging to the Imataca Geological Formation, with an age between 2800 and 3200 million years, since Upata is located in the heart of the oldest segment of the Guayana Massif. In the valley outcrop rocks, slabs, strongly metamorphosed granitic stones, gneiss, with a high content of iron, manganese, and to a lesser extent quartz.

=== Climate ===
Under the Köppen climate classification Upata has a tropical savanna climate (Aw). Upata is also intertropical, with precipitation that varies between 900 and 1,300 millimeters (35–51 in) (annual), in the city proper, and up to 2,000 millimeters (79 in) in some parts of the Mountain range. Average annual temperatures are 26 °C in most of the year. The rains usually begin in November, January and August. Average temperatures are of 19 °C to 17 °C. The warmest month is August with temperatures of 36 °C Max, 26° Min.

In terms of rainfall, they range between 950 mm of rain in the driest years and 1,500 mm in the wettest, with an average of 1,100 mm.

== Economy ==
Upata is capital of Piar Municipality in the Bolívar state. Upata is commonly known as a farming and livestock town. The zones near Upata are suitable for raising ranch and the production of bovine meat. The economy of Upata also is sustained in the milk production and the elaboration of one of the Typical and Original Venezuelan cheeses "Queso Telita Guayanes". It also produce international cheeses like ricotta, mozzarella and others of extraordinary quality. Like other food products typical of the region.

Upata also stands out by its natural beauties, among them: The Stone of Santa Maria, El Toro, and the Guacarapo Hills where it has built a giant concrete statue, symbolizing Our Lady of Peace translated into Spanish as "Virgen de la Paz"

== Education ==
Upata currently has five universities, all public.

- Liberator Experimental Pedagogical University - Extension
- National Experimental Polytechnic University of the Bolivarian Armed Forces - Extension
- Guiana National Experimental University - Extension
- Bolivarian University of Venezuela - Extension
- Simón Rodríguez National Experimental University - Extension

== Sites of interest ==
- Alejandro Otero Park “Bicentennial”
- Holy Mary Stone
- Monument to the Virgin of Peace
- Simón Chávez Stadium
- The Hill of the Bull
- The aquifers of La Carata
- The Caves of Timoteo in Cerro El Jobo
- Simon Bolivar Square
- Plaza Military Park "The Soldier"

== Sports ==
It has two soccer teams that play in the Third Division of Venezuelan Soccer, the Deportivo Upata Fútbol Club and Yaddiel Sport de Upata Fútbol Club.

== Sister Cities ==
- Venezuela Guayana City, Venezuela
- Venezuela Guasipati, Venezuela
- Venezuela Santa Elena de Uairén, Venezuela

== See also ==
- List of cities and towns in Venezuela
