= Medardo Luis Luzardo Romero =

Venezuelan Roman Catholic archbishop (1934–2018)

- Archbishop of Ciudad Bolívar
- Church: Catholic Church
- Archdiocese: Archdiocese of Ciudad Bolívar
- In office: 26 May 1986 – 27 August 2011
- Predecessor: Crisanto Darío Mata Cova
- Successor: Ulises Antonio Gutiérrez Reyes
- Previous posts: Bishop of Ciudad Guayana (1979-1986); Bishop of San Carlos de Venezuela (1972-1979)

Orders
- Ordination: 6 January 1960
- Consecration: 25 July 1972 by José Humberto Quintero Parra

Personal details
- Born: 17 April 1935 Los Puertos de Altagracia, Zulia, United States of Venezuela
- Died: 27 November 2018 (aged 83)

Medardo Luis Luzardo Romero (17 April 1935 – 27 November 2018) was a Venezuelan Roman Catholic archbishop.

== Biography ==
Luzardo Romero was born in Venezuela and was ordained to the priesthood in 1960. Luzardo Romero served as bishop of the Roman Catholic Diocese of San Carlos de Venezuela from 1972 to 1979. He then served as bishop of the Roman Catholic Diocese of Ciudad Guayana from 1979 to 1986. From 1986 to 2011, Luzardo Romero served as archbishop of the Roman Catholic Archdiocese of Ciudad Bolívar.
