= St. Joseph's Cathedral, Puerto Cabello =

St. Joseph's Cathedral
- Catedral de San José
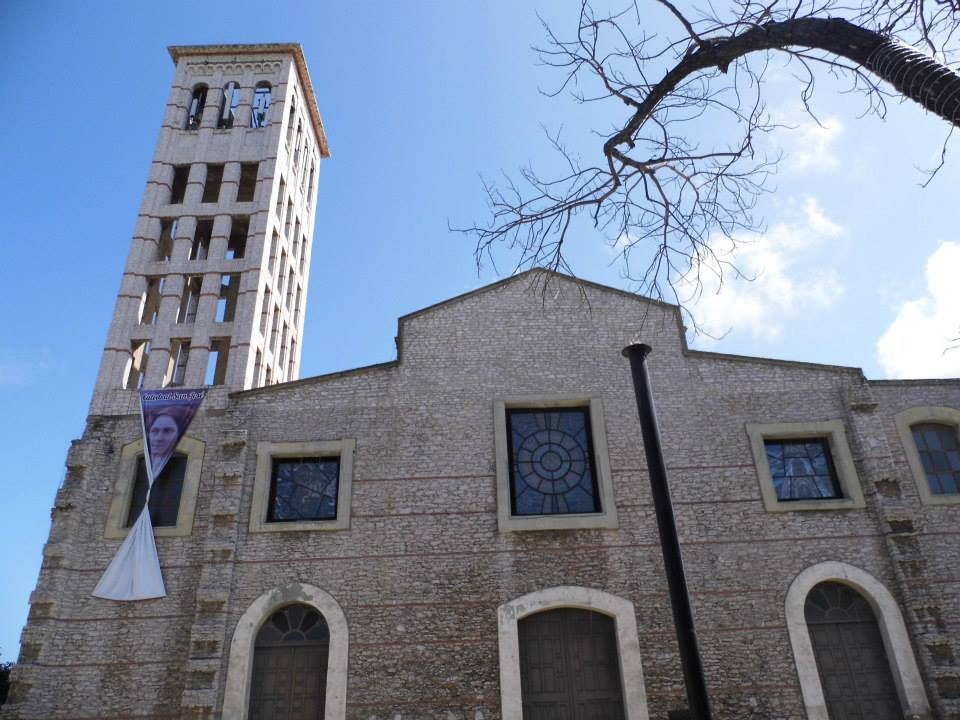
- St. Joseph's Cathedral
- 10.4775°N 68.0088°W
- Location: Puerto Cabello
- Country: Venezuela
- Denomination: Roman Catholic Church

St. Joseph's Cathedral (Spanish: Catedral de San José), also Puerto Cabello Cathedral, is a Catholic cathedral located in the town of Puerto Cabello, Carabobo state, in northern Venezuela.

It is the seat of the Diocese of Puerto Cabello (Dioecesis Portus Cabellensis), created on July 5, 1994, by the bull Sollicitus de spirituali of Pope John Paul II. It is under the pastoral care of Bishop Saul Figueroa Albornoz.

Its history dates back to 1851, when the National Congress granted some land for its construction, which was completed in 1852. Subsequently, it underwent numerous modifications and even became temporarily used as a prison in the Liberation War.

== See also ==
- Roman Catholicism in Venezuela
- St. Joseph's Cathedral (disambiguation)
