= St. Helen's Cathedral, Santa Elena de Uairén =

St. Helen's Cathedral
- Cathedral de Santa Elena de Santa Elena de Uairén
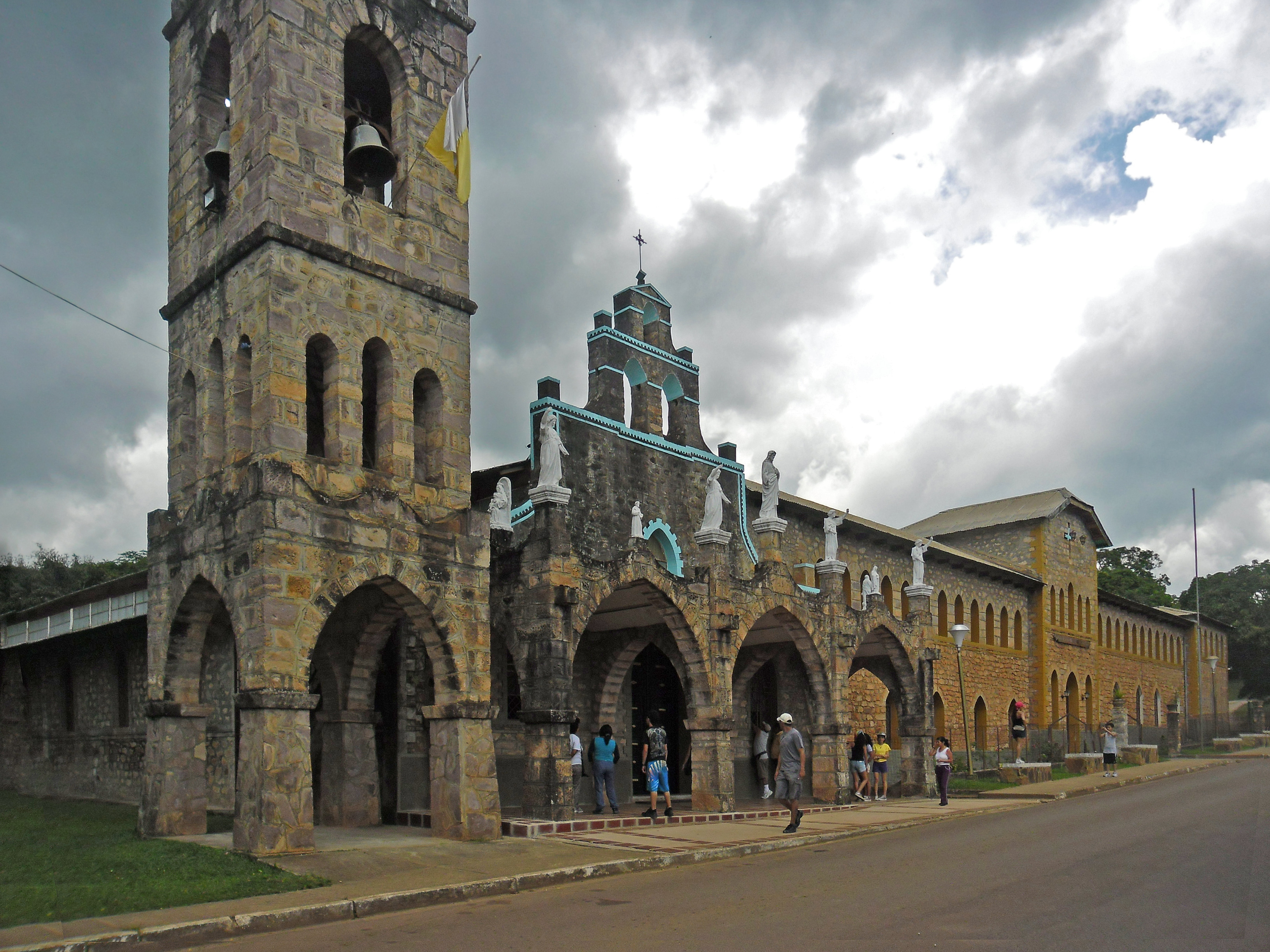
- St. Helen's Cathedral
- 4°36′17″N 61°07′03″W
- Location: Santa Elena de Uairén
- Country: Venezuela
- Denomination: Roman Catholic Church

The St. Helen's Cathedral (Spanish: Catedral de Santa Elena de Santa Elena de Uairén) also known as the Cathedral of Santa Elena de Uairén is a religious building belonging to the Catholic Church. It is located in the town of Santa Elena de Uairén in the Gran Sabana municipality, Bolivar State, in southeastern Venezuela near the border with Brazil.

As its name implies, the cathedral was dedicated to St. Helen (Santa Elena). Its origin dates back to the early 1950s when the Capuchins promoted its construction with stones brought from around the city. It is a popular tourist site, and is one of the most visited places in the town due to its history and architecture.

== See also ==
- Roman Catholicism in Venezuela
