= Cathedral of Our Lady of Mount Carmel, San Fernando de Apure =

Coordinates: 7°53′33″N 67°28′31″W

Cathedral of Our Lady of Mount Carmel
- Catedral Nuestra Señora del Carmen de San Fernando
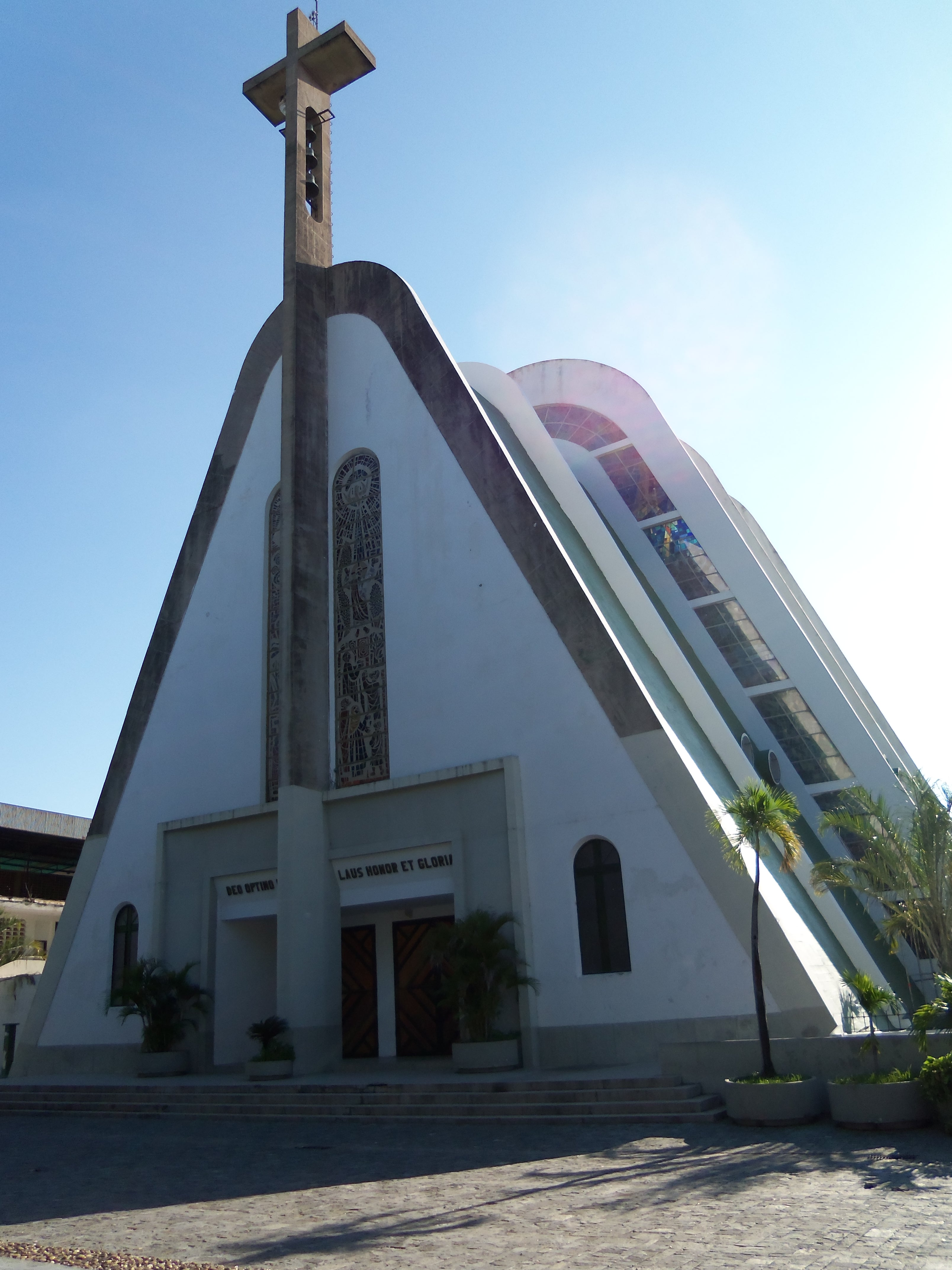
- Cathedral of Our Lady of Mount Carmel
- Location: San Fernando de Apure
- Country: Venezuela
- Denomination: Roman Catholic Church

The Cathedral of Our Lady of Mount Carmel (Spanish: Catedral Nuestra Señora del Carmen de San Fernando) or Cathedral of San Fernando de Apure is a religious building that is affiliated with the Catholic Church and is located in the city of San Fernando de Apure, Apure state capital in the plains of South American country of Venezuela.

The temple follows the Roman or Latin rite and serves as the seat of the diocese of San Fernando de Apure (Dioecesis Sancti Ferdinandi Apurensis) that was created on November 12, 1974, by bull Sancti Ferdinandi Apurensis of Pope Paul VI. As its name indicates the cathedral church was dedicated to the Virgin Mary in its advocation of the Virgen del Carmen.

Its construction took about 10 years beginning in 1959 and following the design of the German architect Richard Klein. It was consecrated in February 1969. It is under the pastoral responsibility of the Bishop Victor Manuel Pérez Rojas.

== See also ==
- Roman Catholicism in Venezuela
- Our Lady of Mount Carmel
