= Cathedral of St. Christopher, San Cristóbal =

Coordinates: 7.76495°N 72.23533°W

Cathedral of St. Christopher
- Catedral de San Cristóbal
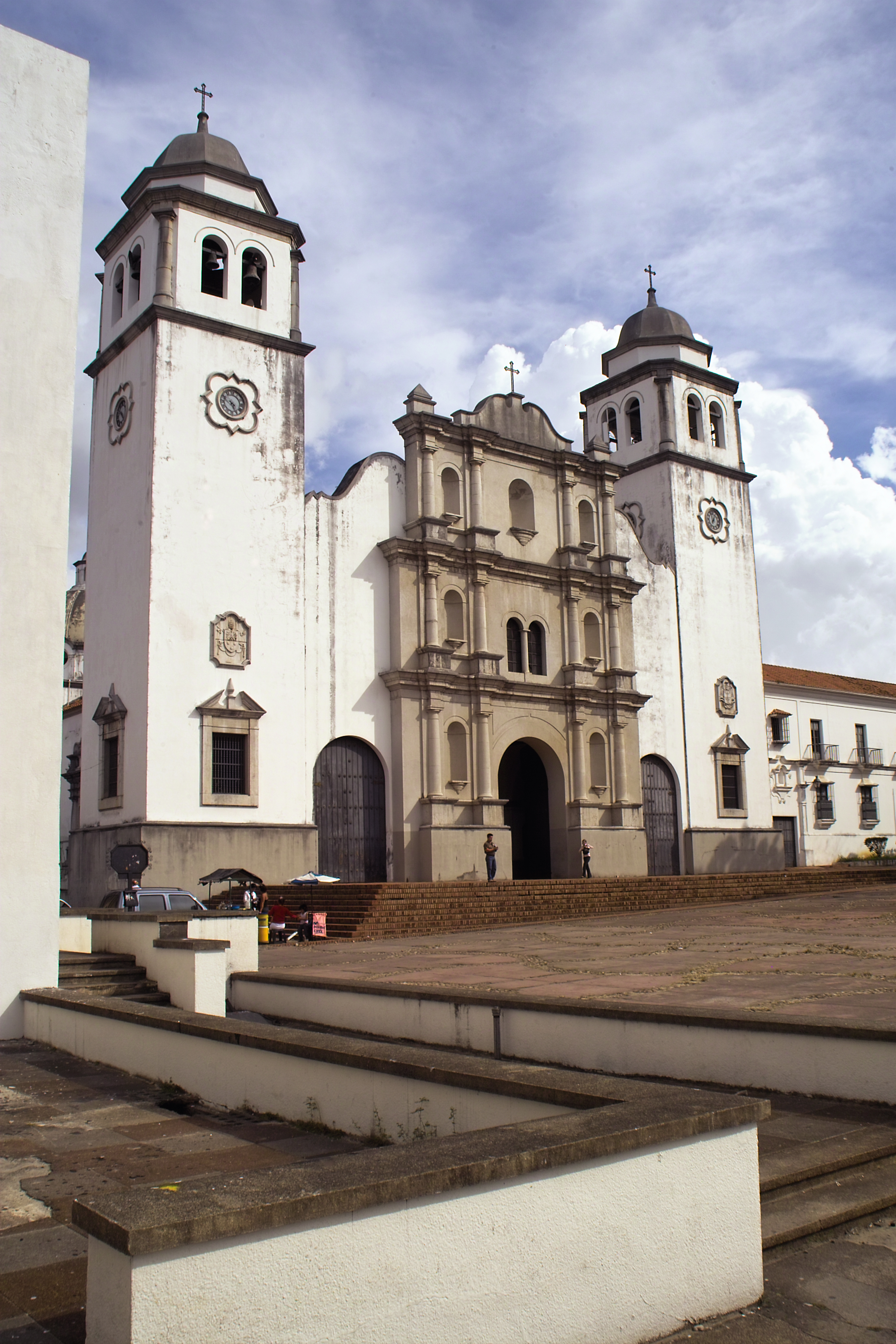
- Cathedral of St. Christopher
- Location: San Cristóbal
- Country: Venezuela
- Denomination: Roman Catholic Church

The Cathedral of St. Christopher (Spanish: Catedral de San Cristóbal) It is a religious building belonging to the Catholic Church and is located at 5 with race 3 at one side of the Juan Maldonado Square, of the town of San Cristóbal in the municipality of San Cristóbal, Táchira State in the Andean region South American country of Venezuela. Not to be confused with another cathedral dedicated to the same saint but located in the city of Barcelona, Anzoátegui State.

The temple has a neo-colonial and baroque style, is the Roman or Latin rite and is the seat of the Diocese of San Cristobal in Venezuela (Dioecesis i Sancti Christophori in Venetiola) that was created by Pope Pius XI on October 12, 1922, by the Apostolic constitution "Ad Munus". In its environs is the Apostolic Palace. In its interior stained glass windows dedicated to the founding of the city and recalling the visit of Simón Bolívar, the liberator of Venezuela in 1813.

== See also ==
- Roman Catholicism in Venezuela
- St. Christopher
