= Cathedral of Our Lady of Coromoto, Punto Fijo =

Cathedral of Our Lady of Coromoto
- Catedral de Nuestra Señora de Coromoto de Punto Fijo
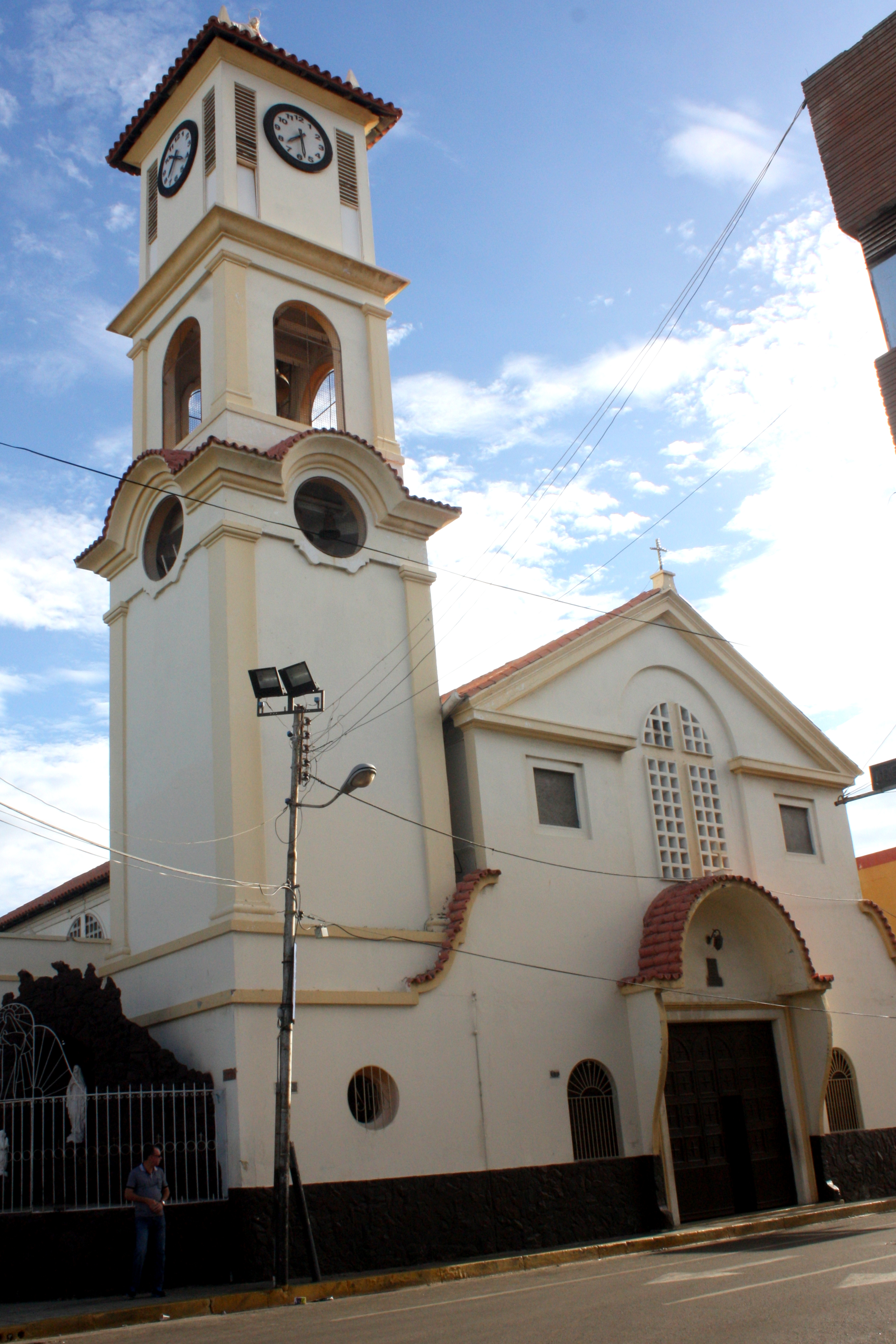
- Cathedral of Our Lady of Coromoto
- Location: Punto Fijo
- Country: Venezuela
- Denomination: Roman Catholic Church

The Cathedral of Our Lady of Coromoto (Spanish: Catedral Nuestra Señora de Coromoto de Punto Fijo) or The Cathedral Church of Punto Fijo, is located in the Comercio street in the center of Punto Fijo in Falcón state, Venezuela. It belongs to the Diocese of Punto Fijo (Dioecesis Punctifixensis) which is based and was founded in 1951, being elevated to Cathedral in 1997.

== History ==
The first priest assigned to the city of Punto Fijo was Father Andrés M. Santiago S.J. in 1947 it is who motivates the faithful to build the temple. With different funds obtained through diferetes activities and collaborations requested to workers in Creole and Shell refineries, it was possible to buy the land. 1949 began the construction of the bases.

On September 8, 1951, is officially stands as Parish Our Lady of Coromoto and Father Andrew was appointed parish priest Monsignor Francisco José Iturriza.

== See also ==
- Roman Catholicism in Venezuela
- Our Lady of Coromoto
