= St. John Paul II Church =

Coordinates: 63.969813°N 22.571594°W

- Kirkja St. Jóhannesar Páls II
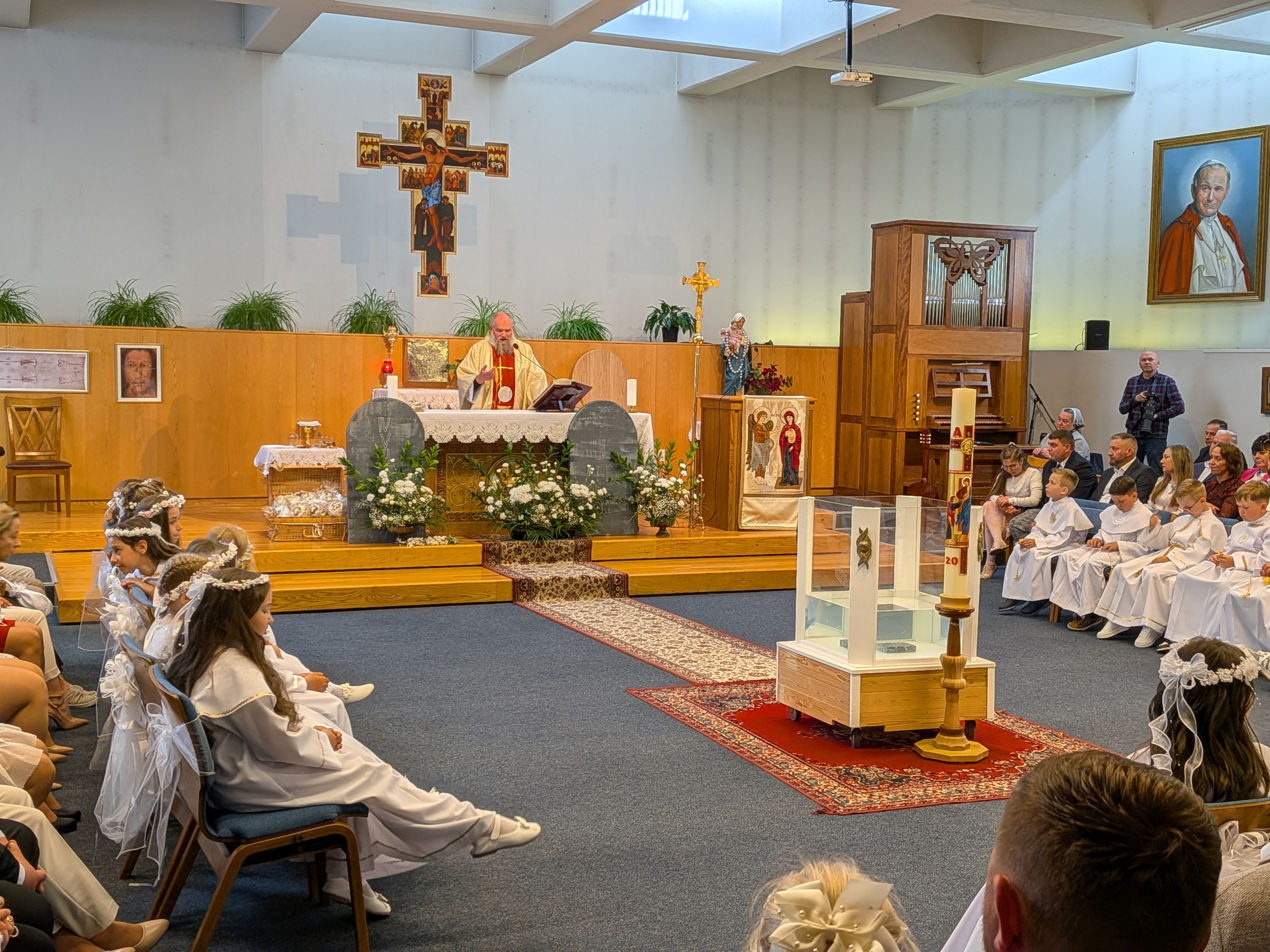
- Interior of the church during a confirmation
- St. John Paul II Church
- Location: Keflavík
- Country: Iceland
- Denomination: Catholic Church

St. John Paul II Church (Icelandic: Kirkja St. Jóhannesar Páls II), a Catholic church in Keflavik, Sudurnes, Iceland.

The congregation is under Diocese of Reykjavík and was dedicated to the memory of Pope John Paul II, who was declared a saint in 2014 by Pope Francis.

Due to the composition of the parish congregation, Masses are offered in Icelandic and Polish.

== See also ==
- Roman Catholicism in Iceland
- St. John Paul II
