= Cathedral of Our Lady of Peace, Trujillo =

Cathedral of Our Lady of Peace
- Catedral de Nuestra Señora de la Paz
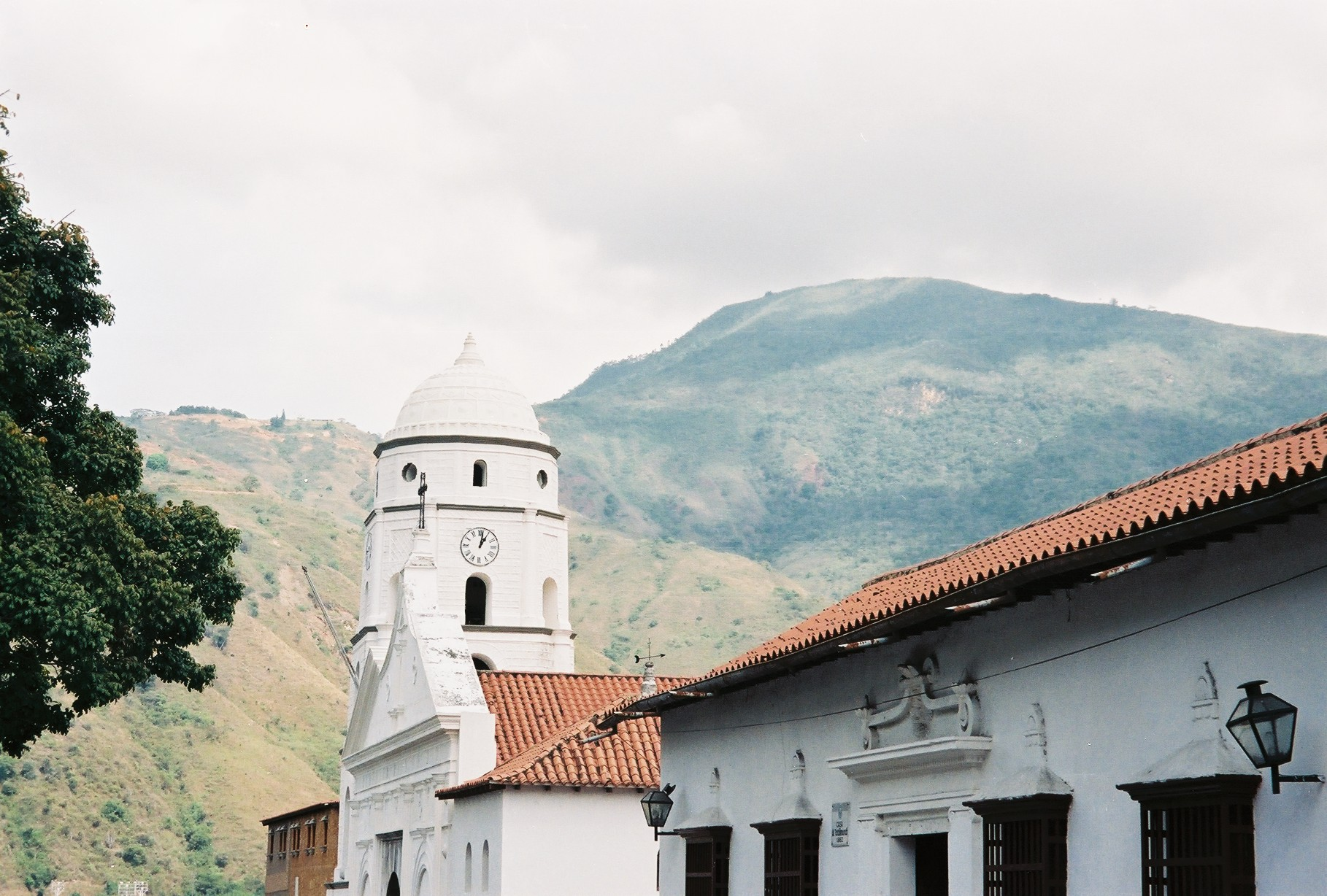
- Cathedral of Our Lady of Peace
- 9°21′55″N 70°26′09″W
- Location: Trujillo
- Country: Venezuela
- Denomination: Roman Catholic Church

The Cathedral of Our Lady of Peace (Spanish: Catedral de Nuestra Señora de la Paz) or alternatively Cathedral of Trujillo, is a religious building that is affiliated with the Catholic Church and is located opposite the Plaza Bolívar between Bolívar and Colón Avenues in the city of Trujillo, Trujillo municipality of Trujillo State in the Andes of South American country of Venezuela.

The temple is Baroque and follows the Roman or Latin rite and functions as the headquarters of the Diocese of Trujillo (Dioecesis truxillensis in Venetiola) that was created on June 4, 1957, with the papal bull In maximis officii of Pope Pius XII.

The current building dates from 1662 and began construction in 1630. With renovations in 1890, the liberator Simón Bolívar, National hero of Venezuela, conducted negotiations with Bishop Lazo de la Vega in the cathedral. For its equity was declared a national historical monument of Venezuela in 1960.

== See also ==
- Roman Catholicism in Venezuela
- Cathedral of Our Lady of Peace
