= Piar Municipality, Bolívar =

Piar Municipality Municipio Piar
- Municipality
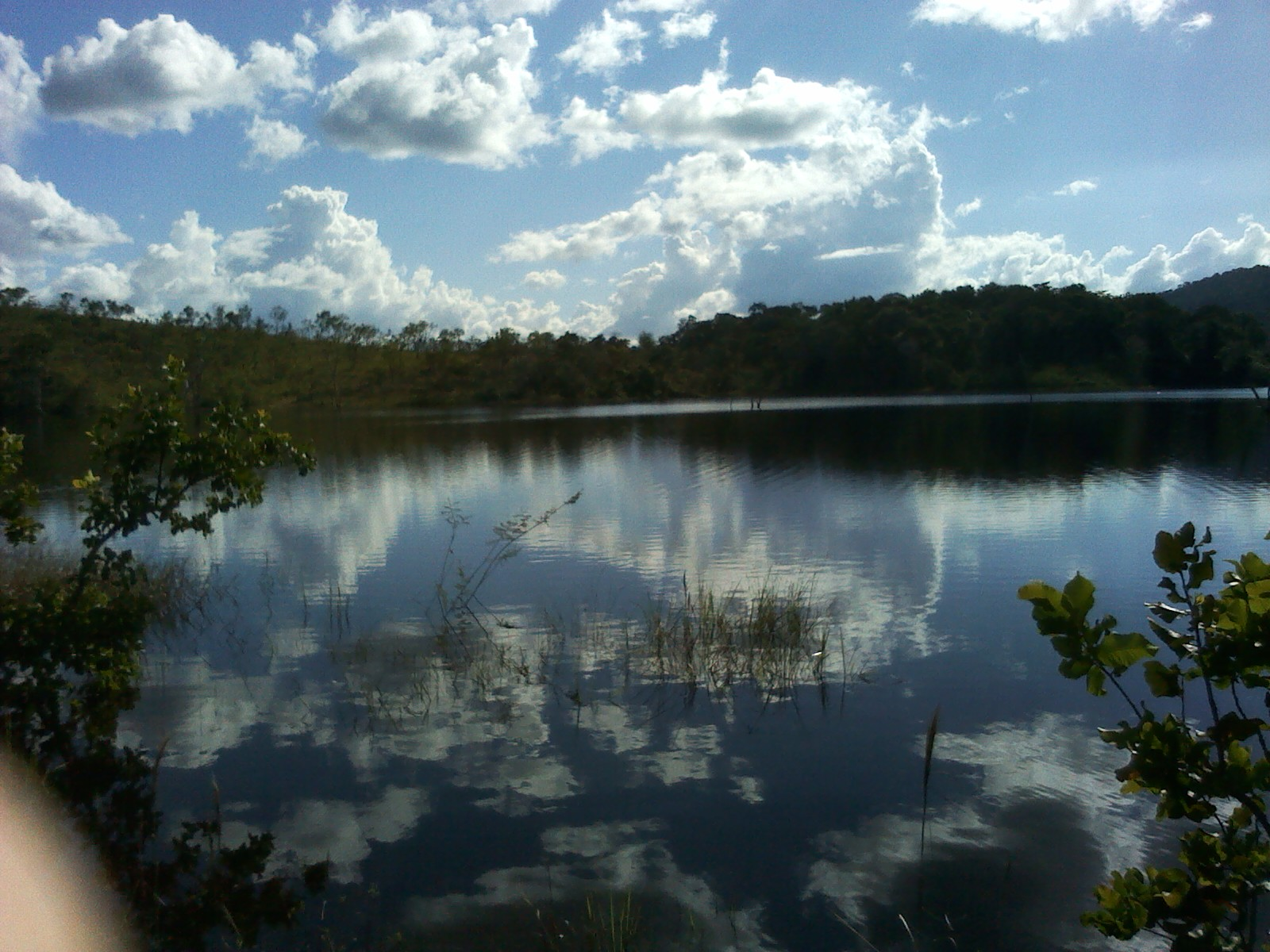

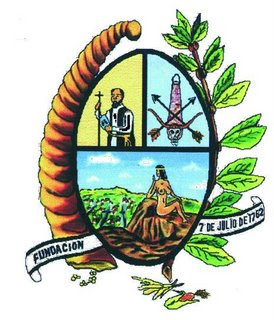
- Flag Coat of arms

- Location in Bolívar

- Location in Venezuela
- Coordinates: 7°18′51″N 62°33′56″W
- Country: Venezuela
- State: Bolívar
- Municipal seat: Upata

Government
  - Mayor: Ornella Valentina Arbelaez (PSUV) ((PSUV))

Area
  - Total: 14,233.6 km^{2} (5,495.6 sq mi)

Population (2011)
  - Total: 98,274
  - Density: 6.9044/km^{2} (17.882/sq mi)
- Time zone: UTC−4 (VET)
- Area code(s): 0288

The Piar Municipality is one of the 11 municipalities (municipios) that makes up the Venezuelan state of Bolívar and, according to the 2011 census by the National Institute of Statistics of Venezuela, the municipality has a population of 98,274. The town of Upata is the shire town of the Piar Municipality.

== History ==
The creation of this municipality took place between 1960 and 1990. The municipality was named after the important independence hero, Manuel Piar.

== Demographics ==
The Piar Municipality, according to a 2007 population estimate by the National Institute of Statistics of Venezuela, has a population of 107,643 (up from 94,274 in 2000). This amounts to 7% of the state's population. The municipality's population density is 6.77 inhabitants per square kilometre (17.5/sq mi).

== Government ==
The mayor of the Piar Municipality is Francisco Contreras, elected on October 31, 2004, with 44% of the vote. He replaced Americo De Grazia shortly after the elections. The municipality is divided into two (three if you count the Capital Piar section) parishes; Andrés Eloy Blanco and Pedro Cova.

=== Weather ===
The climate is tropical savannah in the north and center, alternating with tropical rainforest in the south and in the highlands of Imataca. Average temperatures in the plains of 26 degrees, averages of 25 to 24 degrees in the areas located above 300 meters above sea level, up to averages of 22 to 23 degrees in the fringes of tepuis and plateaus that are located on the border with the Gran Municipality of savannah Minimums around 21 degrees average, with maximums of 34 degrees in its areas of greater insolation and with a more pronounced dry season, located in the Center and North of the municipality.

=== Parish Organization ===
The municipality has 3 parishes

- Andrés Eloy Blanco (El Pao, this parish is the smallest in the municipality, located in the North and Northwest of the municipality). Its approximate population is 4 thousand inhabitants. The population of El Pao was home for more than 50 years to the second largest iron mining company in Venezuela, where a high-quality mine was produced or theorized from Cerro Florero, at an average of 2 million tons per year, the first explored by the North American company. American Iron Mining Company, later nationalized and transferred its assets to the public company of the Corporação Venezuelana de Guayana Ferrominera del Orinoco. This population center emerged as a typical encampment of mining technicians, currently the authorities are trying to redefine its role as a residential area, small business, tourism, education, small craft offices and food processing. Around them are populated by agricultural producers in the rural areas of El Retumbo, El Trical, El Arrozal, Cerro Azul, Los Morrocoyes, Mina Abajo, Pao Viejo, El Corozo, Cunaviche, Las Adjuntas and Los Jabillos.
- Capital section (Upata), covering a third of the municipal territory, is located to the north and center of the territory up to the area of the Oronata Carichapo rivers, which separates it from the cattle lands of El Manteco and Guasipati. It concentrates the largest urban nucleus in Upata, with about 80 thousand inhabitants, in addition to another 10 thousand residents who live in its extensive and numerous rural areas, including Los Rosas, Sucutum, Monteralo, La Venada, La Estrechura, Mamonal, Cacahual, Campanario, El Valle, Las Grullitas, Los Negros, Montecristo, Los Arrendajos, Buen Retiro, El Yagual, Montaña de Lino, San Martín, Mundo Nuevo, Altagracia, Sabaneta, Sabanetica, Guayabal, Santa Rosa, El Tigre, Santa María, Manganese, El Buey, Matajey, El Piso, El Silencio, Tierra Blanca and Guacamayo, among others.
- Parroquia Pedro Cova (El Manteco), is the largest territorial political unit of the municipality, as it covers two thirds of the municipal entity, from the Oronata River to the right bank of the river Carrao, in the border area with the municipality of Gran Sabana. It concentrates the largest beef cattle production units in the municipality, where no less than 60,000 heads of cattle graze, it is also the logging area in the Arborizado San Pedro area, and the alluvial gold production area in the Supamo Parapoy sector. Guarichem, as well as on the right bank of Lake Guri. Its population is about 5 thousand inhabitants. It also has an important tourist potential in the aquatic area of the Guri reservoir, and due to its proximity to the Canaima National Park, in fact there are two important hotel centers in the city of El Manteco linked to jungle, adventure and fishing tourism • of abundant fresh water in this sector).

== See also ==
- Upata
- Bolívar
- Municipalities of Venezuela
