= Puerto Ayacucho =

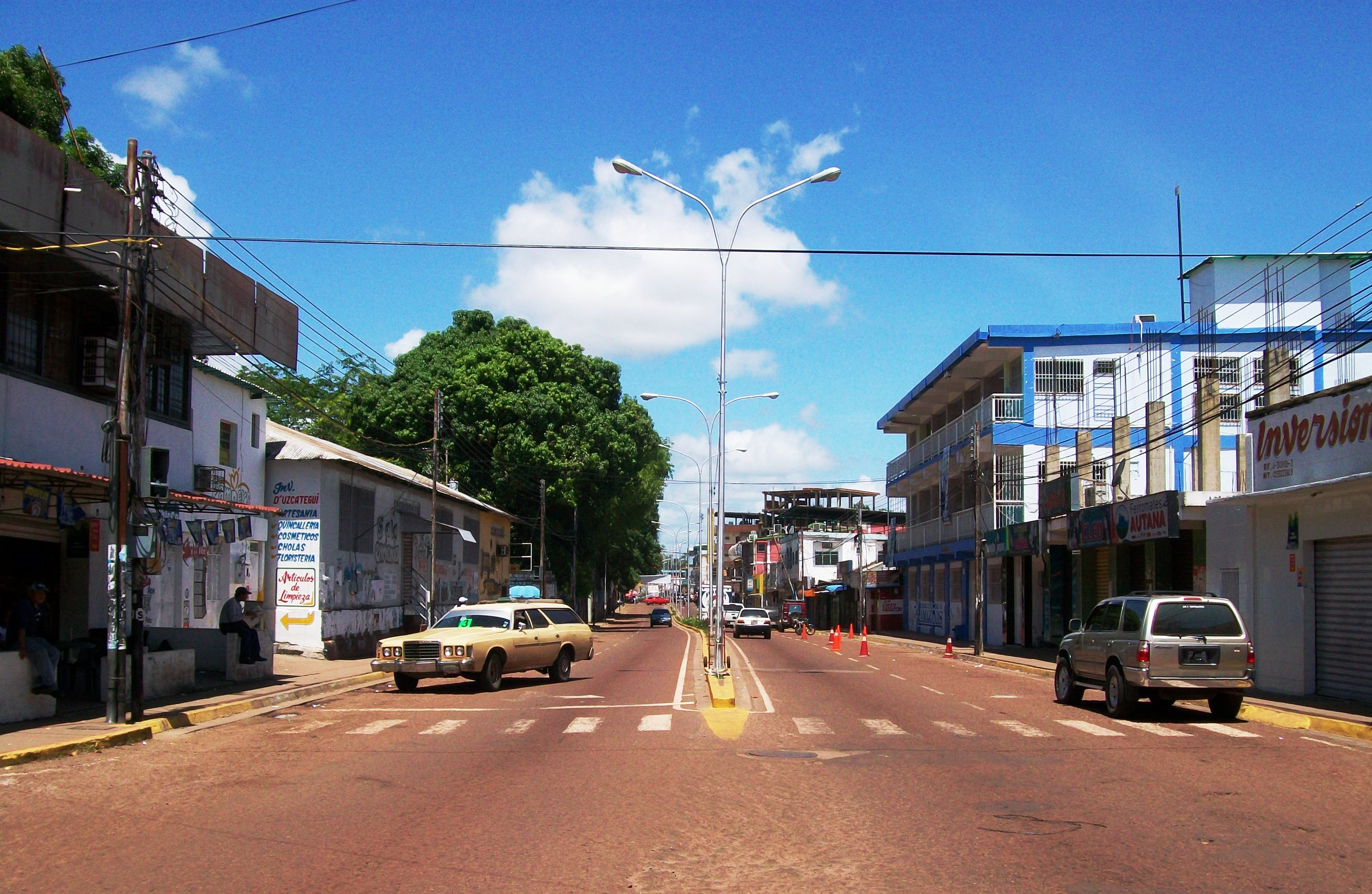
- Orinoco Avenue in Puerto Ayacucho

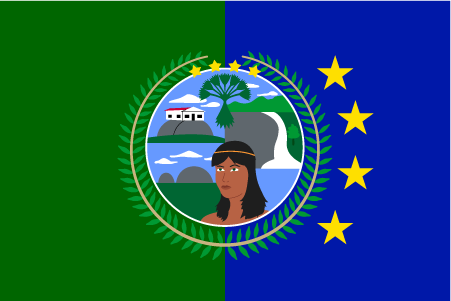
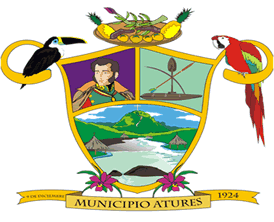
- Flag Coat of arms

- Location in Venezuela
- Coordinates: 5°39′47″N 67°37′35″W
- Country: Venezuela
- State: Amazonas
- Municipality: Atures Municipality
- Founded: 1924

Area
  - City: 281.02 sq mi (727.85 km^{2})

Population (2008)
  - Metro: 41,000
- Time zone: UTC−4 (VET)
- Climate: Am

Puerto Ayacucho (Spanish pronunciation: [ˈpweɾto aʝaˈkutʃo]) is the capital and largest city of Amazonas State in Venezuela. Puerto Ayacucho is located across the Orinoco River from the Colombian village of Casuarito.

The city was founded to facilitate the transport of goods past the Atures Rapids on the Orinoco River in the late 19th century (mostly rubber). Now the economy is supported by both national and international tourism. Also based here is the Venezuelan army and navy, conducting a continuous low level campaign against incursions and drug-runners from nearby Colombia. The climate is equatorial and the surrounding rainforests are some of the world's least explored and most untouched. The nearby forested mountains (tepuis) contain some of the world's least investigated microsystems.

== History ==
Puerto Ayacucho began to be built in 1924 at the initiative of the regime of Juan Vicente Gómez, who was alerted to the strategic riches of the region, and was officially founded on December 9, 1928, in commemoration of the Battle of Ayacucho, by the engineer and geologist Santiago Aguerrevere. It thus replaced San Fernando de Atabapo, which had been the administrative center of this former district, then province, later federal territory and finally state. Located on a huge black granite rock, facing the Colombian shore, the city is today the most important town in Amazonas and a river port that brings together the economic activity of the area.

The second "Simón Bolívar" Hospital. It was inaugurated on August 11, 1938, by Governor Rafael Simón Urbina. It was built under the direction and design of Father Alfredo Bonvecchio. Dr. López Rivas, employed by the then Ministry of Health, attended from this hospital. He arrived in Puerto Ayacucho on October 26, 1937. He was the first doctor who practiced his profession in the city that was born, as a government employee. The work was decreed and started by the previous governor Alfredo Franco. It is the current Casa Sindical.

The oldest known map of Puerto Ayacucho was drawn by Ramón Ojeda Briceño, Bachelor of Pharmacy, in 1940.There were 120 houses and between 600 and 700 inhabitants, most of them with palm roofs, dirt floors and wattle and daub walls.

This city grew at a very slow pace until the 60's. From the 70's onwards, there was a real explosion or growth, mainly due to the internal migration of the Territory itself, and later to the immigration of people from other neighboring states.

== Geography ==
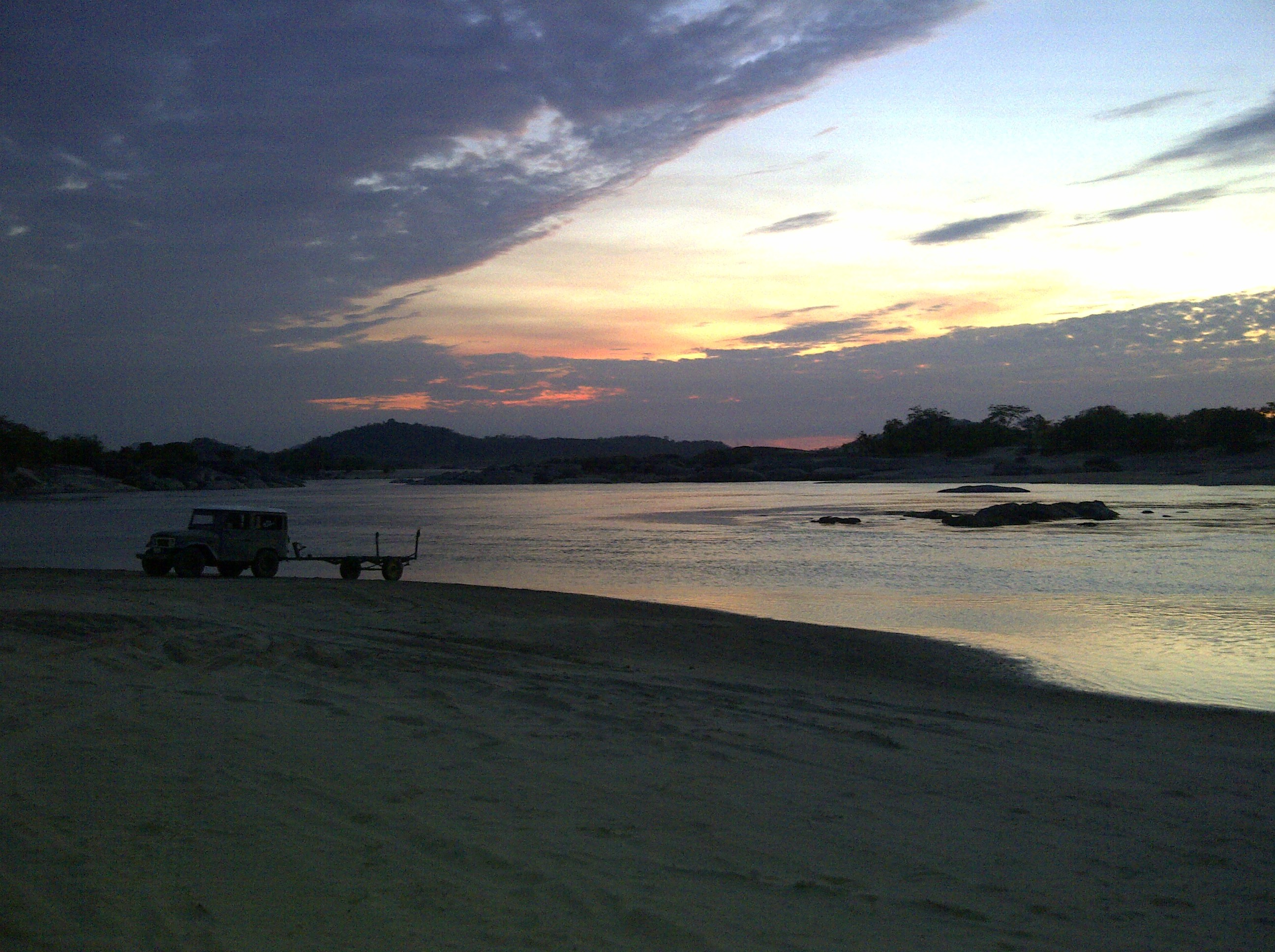
A beach in Puerto Ayacucho, Orinoco River

200 km to the south is the Casiquiare canal, a waterway that links South America's two largest river systems, the Amazon and the Orinoco. This was first visited by Europeans in the 17th century and explored in 1800 by naturalist Alexander von Humboldt, who commented on the recent extinction of the Aturès Indians for whom the Atures Rapids had been named. The water in the Casiquiare flows from the Orinoco River into the Rio Negro, tributary of the Amazon, though much more is gathered en route from numerous tributaries.

90 km to the east is the second highest waterfall in Venezuela, the 2,200 ft (670 m) Yutaje Falls. The surrounding rainforest contains some facilities for tourists, including an airstrip, and the area also has a large population of greenwing macaws, Ara chloroptera. There are also jaguars, pink river dolphins, numerous monkeys and other bird life.

The inhabitants are mostly mestizo – of mixed indigenous and Spanish descent. There are a number of local indigenous tribes including the Yanomami, the Panare, the Bari, Piaroa, and Guajibo (also known as Jibis).

=== Climate ===
Puerto Ayacucho has a tropical monsoon climate (Köppen climate classification Am) with a short dry season from December to March.

Climate data for Puerto Ayacucho
Month	Jan	Feb	Mar	Apr	May	Jun	Jul	Aug	Sep	Oct	Nov	Dec	Year
Record high °C (°F)	38.8 (101.8)	39.6 (103.3)	40.2 (104.4)	39.0 (102.2)	38.6 (101.5)	35.2 (95.4)	35.0 (95.0)	35.8 (96.4)	36.4 (97.5)	37.6 (99.7)	36.8 (98.2)	37.4 (99.3)	40.2 (104.4)
Mean daily maximum °C (°F)	34.4 (93.9)	35.4 (95.7)	35.5 (95.9)	33.5 (92.3)	31.5 (88.7)	30.4 (86.7)	30.3 (86.5)	31.0 (87.8)	31.9 (89.4)	32.7 (90.9)	33.2 (91.8)	33.5 (92.3)	32.8 (91.0)
Daily mean °C (°F)	28.6 (83.5)	29.3 (84.7)	29.6 (85.3)	28.6 (83.5)	27.3 (81.1)	26.5 (79.7)	26.3 (79.3)	26.7 (80.1)	27.2 (81.0)	27.7 (81.9)	28.0 (82.4)	28.1 (82.6)	27.8 (82.0)
Mean daily minimum °C (°F)	22.7 (72.9)	23.2 (73.8)	23.7 (74.7)	23.6 (74.5)	23.1 (73.6)	22.6 (72.7)	22.3 (72.1)	22.4 (72.3)	22.5 (72.5)	22.7 (72.9)	22.8 (73.0)	22.7 (72.9)	22.9 (73.2)
Record low °C (°F)	17.8 (64.0)	18.4 (65.1)	18.3 (64.9)	19.7 (67.5)	17.2 (63.0)	19.3 (66.7)	18.1 (64.6)	18.3 (64.9)	18.3 (64.9)	19.3 (66.7)	19.9 (67.8)	17.5 (63.5)	17.2 (63.0)
Average rainfall mm (inches)	31 (1.2)	36 (1.4)	74 (2.9)	163 (6.4)	311 (12.2)	408 (16.1)	398 (15.7)	298 (11.7)	198 (7.8)	183 (7.2)	127 (5.0)	42 (1.7)	2,269 (89.3)
Average rainy days (≥ 1.0 mm)	2.8	2.9	5.1	11.3	18.2	22.3	22.4	19.5	14.8	13.9	9.4	5.0	147.6
Average relative humidity (%)	72.4	70.3	72.3	72.8	74.3	75.8	74.5	72.1	71.3	73.4	72.8	72.8	72.9
Mean monthly sunshine hours	275.9	252.0	248.0	177.0	151.9	129.0	145.7	155.0	168.0	201.5	222.0	260.4	2,386.4
Source 1: Instituto Nacional de Meteorología e Hidrología (INAMEH)
Source 2: NOAA (extremes, precipitation, and sun)

== Transportation ==
Two national highways connect it with the rest of the country. The first is Troncal 12, via Caicara del Orinoco. The second is Troncal 2, via San Fernando de Apure, which intercepts Troncal 12 in the vicinity of Puerto Páez, Apure State.

The city has a national airport, Cacique Aramare Airport, located south of the city. It currently provides commercial services through the national airline Conviasa, which has one daily flight from the Simón Bolívar International Airport (Maiquetía). Local flights depart from Cacique Aramare Airport to other towns in the state, such as San Juan de Manapiare, Maroa, San Fernando de Atabapo, San Carlos de Río Negro and La Esmeralda.

== Tourist areas ==
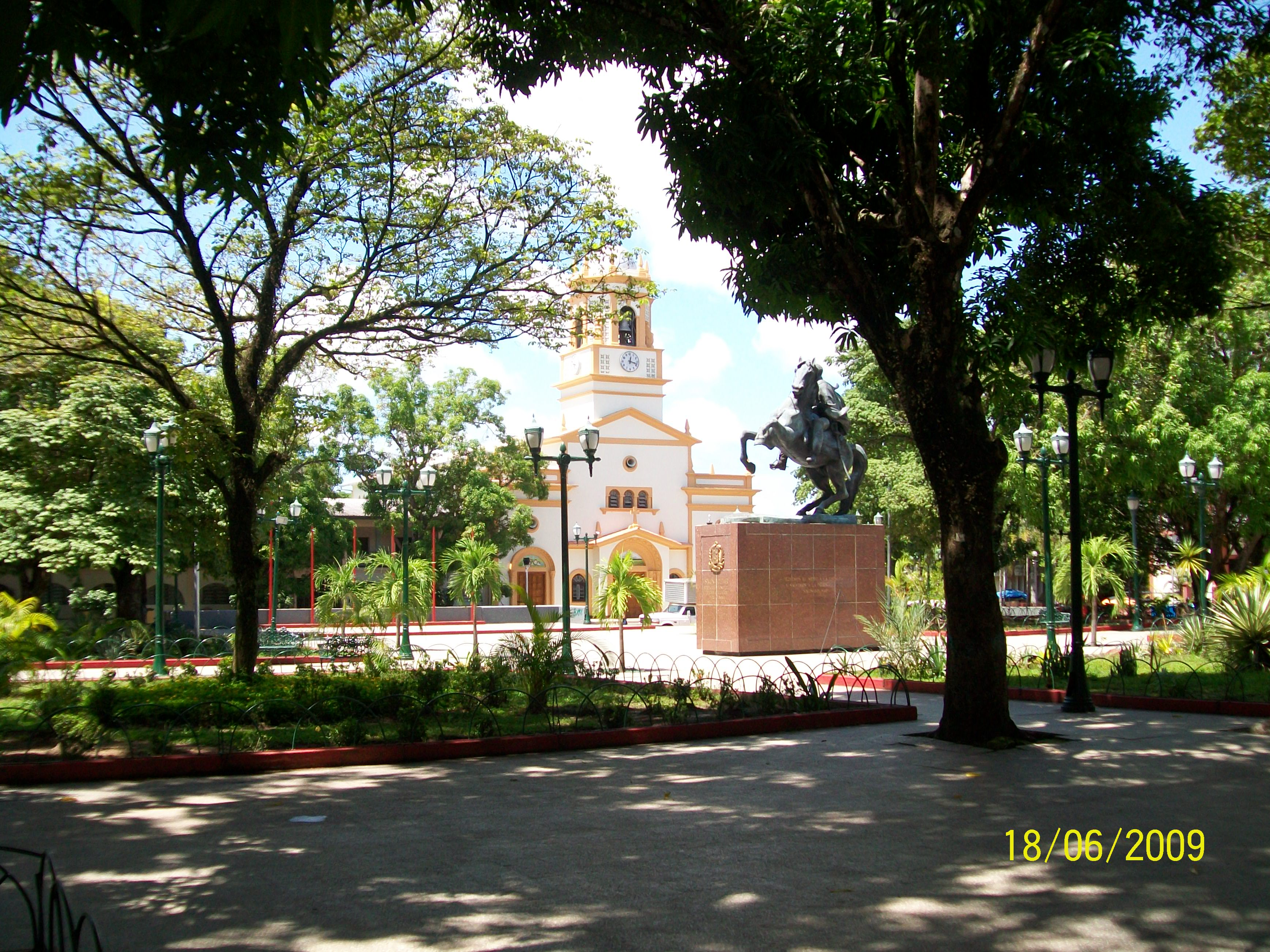
Bolivar Square

- Tobogán de la Selva: it is a large slab (rock) through which water flows forming a natural slide that ends in a pool of cold water.
- Rómulo Betancourt" Square: Popularly known as "Plaza de Los Indios", it is a place where the indigenous people of the area come to sell their handicrafts.
- Ethnological Museum of Amazonas "Monsignor Enzo Ceccarelli": where the history is told in detail since the arrival of the missionaries until today.
- Cathedral "Maria Auxiliadora": built in 1952, in whose interior there is an enormous Christ painted in oil.
- Indigenous Market.
- Bolivar Square.
- Cold Mountain.
- Tourist center "La Perla Negra
- Raudales de Atures and Maipures.
- The viewpoint of Monte Bello.
- Spas: Pozo azul, Pozo cristal, Los Márquez, Las Tinajas.

== See also ==
- Cathedral of Mary Help of Christians, Puerto Ayacucho
- List of cities and towns in Venezuela
