= Cathedral of Mary Help of Christians, Puerto Ayacucho =

Coordinates: 5.6668°N 67.6278°W

Cathedral of Mary Help of Christians
- Catedral de María Auxiliadora de Puerto Ayacucho
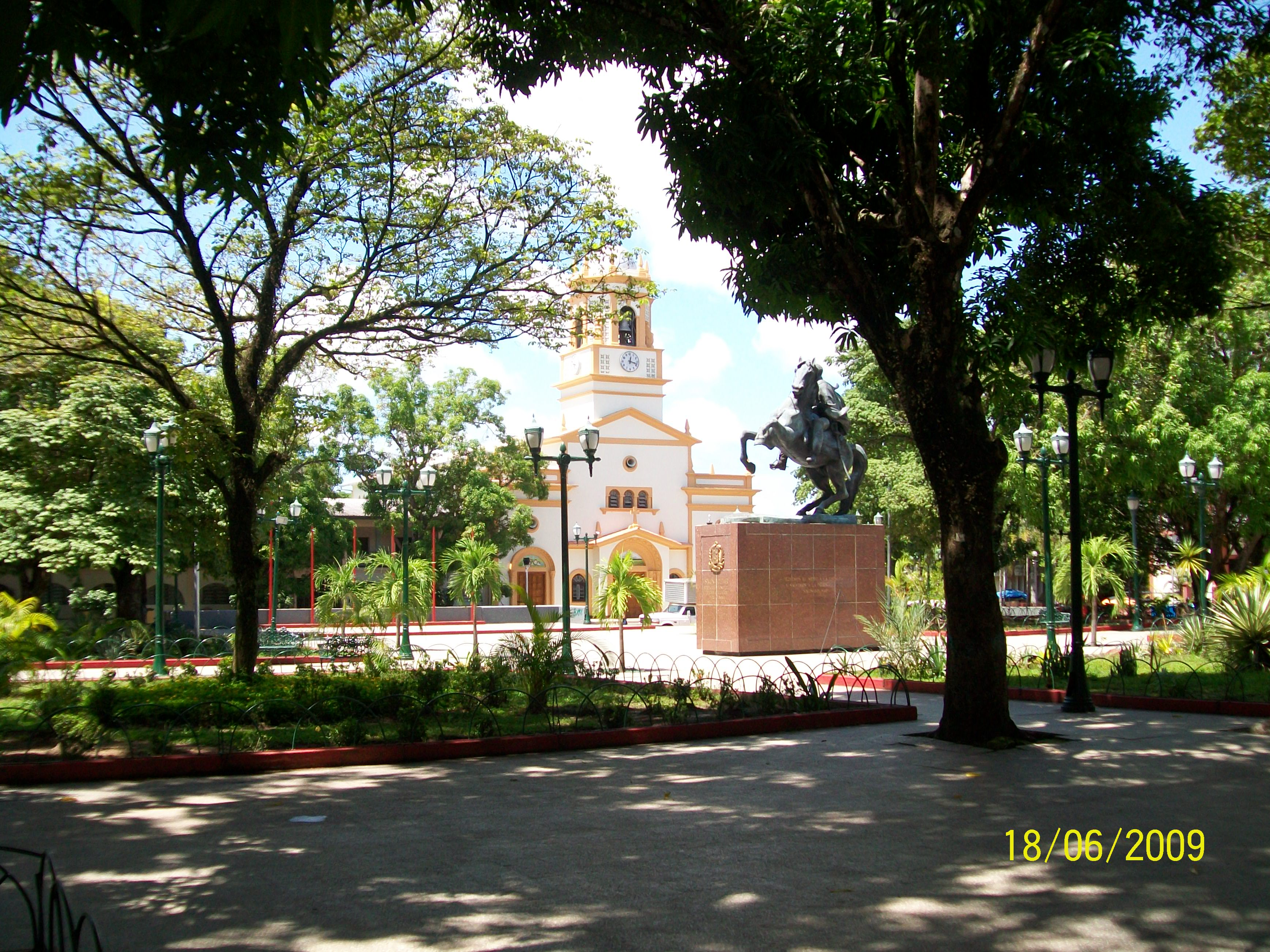
- Cathedral of Mary Help of Christians
- Location: Puerto Ayacucho
- Country: Venezuela
- Denomination: Roman Catholic Church

The Cathedral of Mary Help of Christians (Spanish: Catedral de María Auxiliadora de Puerto Ayacucho) or the Cathedral of Puerto Ayacucho is a religious building of the Catholic church that is located in Puerto Ayacucho in Amazonas state, in the South American country of Venezuela. It is the seat of the Apostolic Vicariate of Puerto Ayacucho, and is located in the Plaza de Bolivar in Puerto Ayacucho with which it shares the status of Venezuela National Monument.

The current apostolic vicar is Bishop José Ángel Divasson Cilveti in office since 23 February 1996. It is the main place of Catholic worship in the city, the new classical style building is a project of Spanish architect Asterio del Prado. The construction took place from 1952 to 1954. The interior houses a large altarpiece, the work of Spanish artist Rafael Ochoa made in 1957.

== See also ==
- Roman Catholicism in Venezuela
- Cathedral of Mary Help of Christians
