= Diocese of Ciudad Guayana =

Latin Catholic diocese in Venezuela

Coordinates: 8.2966°N 62.7221°W

Diocese of Ciudad Guayana Dioecesis Civitatis Guayanensis

Catholic

Location
- Country: Venezuela
- Metropolitan: Ciudad Bolívar

Statistics
- Area: 53,596 km^{2} (20,694 sq mi)
- Population: Total; Catholics: (as of 2004); 850,000; 765,000 (90.0%)

Information
- Denomination: Catholic Church
- Sui iuris church: Latin Church
- Rite: Roman Rite
- Established: 20 August 1979 (47 years ago)
- Cathedral: Pro-Cathedral of Our Lady of Fatima

Current leadership
- Pope: Leo XIV
- Bishop: Carlos Alfredo Cabezas Mendoza

Map

The Diocese of Ciudad Guayana (Latin: Dioecesis Civitatis Guayanensis) is a Latin Church diocese of the Catholic Church located in the city of Ciudad Guayana, Venezuela. It is in the ecclesiastical province of Ciudad Bolívar.

== History ==
On 20 August 1979, Pope John Paul II established the Diocese of Ciudad Guayana from the Archdiocese of Ciudad Bolívar.

In the 2010s, a shortage of priests and religious communities strained the diocese's finances and ability to do "their best to respond to the corporal and spiritual challenges bred by widespread poverty and violence."

== Bishops ==
=== Ordinaries ===
- Medardo Luis Luzardo Romero (20 August 1979 – 26 May 1986) Appointed, Archbishop of Ciudad Bolívar
- José de Jesús Nuñez Viloria (13 January 1987 – 21 July 1990)
- Ubaldo Ramón Santana Sequera, F.M.I. (2 May 1991 – 11 November 2000) Appointed, Archbishop of Maracaibo
- Mariano José Parra Sandoval (10 July 2001 – 25 October 2016) Appointed, Archbishop of Coro
- Helizandro Emiro Terán Bermúdez, O.S.A. (29 July 2017 – 19 March 2022)
- Carlos Alfredo Cabezas Mendoza (since 8 December 2022 -).

=== Other priests of this diocese who became bishops ===
- Ángel Francisco Caraballo Fermín, appointed Auxiliary Bishop of Maracaibo in 2012, and metropolitan archbishop of Cumaná, Venezuela in 2025.
- Juan Carlos Bravo Salazar, appointed Bishop of Acarigua-Araure in 2015.

== See also ==
- Catholic Church in Venezuela
