= Ad Clivum Cucumeris Catacomb =

Roman catacomb

Coordinates: 41°55′36.638″N 12°28′57.191″E

The ad Clivum Cucumeris Catacomb (Italian: catacomba ad clivum Cucumeris) was one of the catacombs of Rome, sited on the ancient via Salaria (today's via Paisiello, via Bertoloni and via Oriani) according to ancient sources but not yet conclusively identified with any surviving ancient remains.

These sources place it last on the topographical list of Rome, after those of San Panfilo and Sant'Ermete. The Notitia ecclesiarum urbis Romae, a 7th-century pilgrims' guide, invites the faithful to visit the catacombs of San Valentino then to go along the via Salaria and—before going to Sant'Ermete—to visit the cemetery of Saint John "ad clivum cucumeris" (literally "on the watermelon hill" or "on the cucumber hill"). Other sources refer to it as sancti Ioannes ad clivum cucumeris, septem palumbae (seven pigeons), coemeterium ad caput sancti Iohannis (cemetery of St John's head). The saint John in question is a priest called John, beheaded under Julian - the head was buried in an underground basilica, whilst the rest of his body was placed in the catacomb. The ancient sources state that the same catacomb also contained the remains of Liberatus, Longinus, Diogenes and Bonifacius, and Festus and Bastus.

Pasquale Testini theorises that it was near the Acqua Acetosa, whilst others have identified the clivum cucumeris as the steeply-sloped present-day via Francesco Denza, which branches off what was the via Salaria and turns towards the ancient via Flaminia. Investigations between via Denza, via Bertolini and via Mercalli by Father Umberto Maria Fasola between 1954 and 1955 led him to announce that he had discovered the catacomb. New studies place it on a diversion off the ancient via Salaria at the top of via Denza and via Oriani.
