= Catacomb of Sant'Ilaria =

The Catacomb of Sant'Ilaria is a small catacomb on the left side of the ancient via Salaria, under the modern villa Ada in the modern Parioli quartiere of Rome. Named after Saint Hilaria, mother of Saint Afra, it is entered through a modern entrance.

A narrow communication tunnel was opened between it and the neighbouring Catacomb of the Iordani in the 18th century by relic hunters and tomb robbers. That of Sant'Ilaria was visited at the end of the 16th century by Antonio Bosio, who described frescoes from it in his posthumously-published Roma sotterranea. Little of these paintings survives - only the horses' heads and a running figure remain in those in the so-called 'arcosolium of the charioteer'.
