= Catacomb of San Panfilo =

Coordinates: 41.9184°N 12.4936°E

The Catacomb of San Panfilo is one of the catacombs of Rome, sited under via Paisiello and via Spontini in the Pinciano quarter and along the line of the ancient route of the via Salaria. It is named after the Carthaginian martyr Pamphilus. The modern-day entrance is in Santa Teresa del Bambin Gesù in Panfilo. The ancient sources identify it as the first catacomb on the via Salaria starting from porta Pinciana.

Its earliest nucleus dates to the 3rd century. It is not mentioned in the ancient liturgical sources, nor which martyrs were buried in it, and there are no remains of an above-ground basilica with the cult of a saint or martyr. Only the 7th century pilgrim itineraries mention it as containing saints Pamphilus, Candidus and Quirinus, alongside several other martyrs. One itinerary, De locis sanctis martyrum quae sunt foris civitatis Romae, mentions Candidus and Quirinus, but no trace of their graves has been found. The Martyrologium Hieronymianum for 21 September names Pamphilus.

It has three levels, two of which are linked to each other, along with a third intermediate level. The lowest and earliest floor dates to the 3rd century and lies 20 metres below the present ground level - it is made up of a 60-metre-long main artery, like the decumanus of an ancient Roman town, with galleries opening off it at right-angles. During the 4th century this level was added to a new area made up of other galleries, including the famous 'cubiculum duplex' housing the remains of Pamphilus' wife and traces of Pamphilus' cult. The intermediate floor is made up of two ambulacra linked to each other by a series of galleries. The first floor, much damaged by above-ground construction, dates to 348-361.

== Rediscovery ==
As the catacombs were abandoned little by little, that of San Panfilo was completely forgotten until being rediscovered by Antonio Bosio, who penetrated its first level on 16 May 1594. It was then lost again for another 300 years until 'corpisantari' (relic-hunters), which kept the two lowest two floors free from relic-hunters and in a perfect state of conservation.

In 1920 and the following years Enrico Josi rediscovered the catacomb a second time and definitively identified it:

The first indication of the existence of a funerary centre, which led to the discovery of the necropolis on 25 February 1920, was a cable drilling in a construction site of the Società Anonima per Imprese Edilizie which cut into a group of tunnels partly strengthened by ancient tufelli and brick walls.

The marble slabs in the catacomb have been noted by scholars thanks to Josi's publications.

== Bibliography ==
- (in Italian) De Santis L. - G. Biamonte, Le catacombe di Roma, Newton & Compton Editori, Roma 1997, pp. 150-155
- (in Italian) Pasquale Testini, Archeologia Cristiana, Edipuglia, 1980, pp. 260-261
