= Saint Paulina =

Saint Paulina or Saint Pauline may refer to:

- Paulina, wife of Hadrias, martyred under the emperor Valerian, buried in Sant'Agata de' Goti, Rome
- Paulina, one of the seven virgins buried in the Catacomb of the Iordani
- Paulina of Rome (died c. 302)
- Paulina of Thuringia (died 1107)
- Pauline of the Agonizing Heart of Jesus (1865–1942)
