= Pinciano =

Q. III Pinciano
- Quartiere of Rome
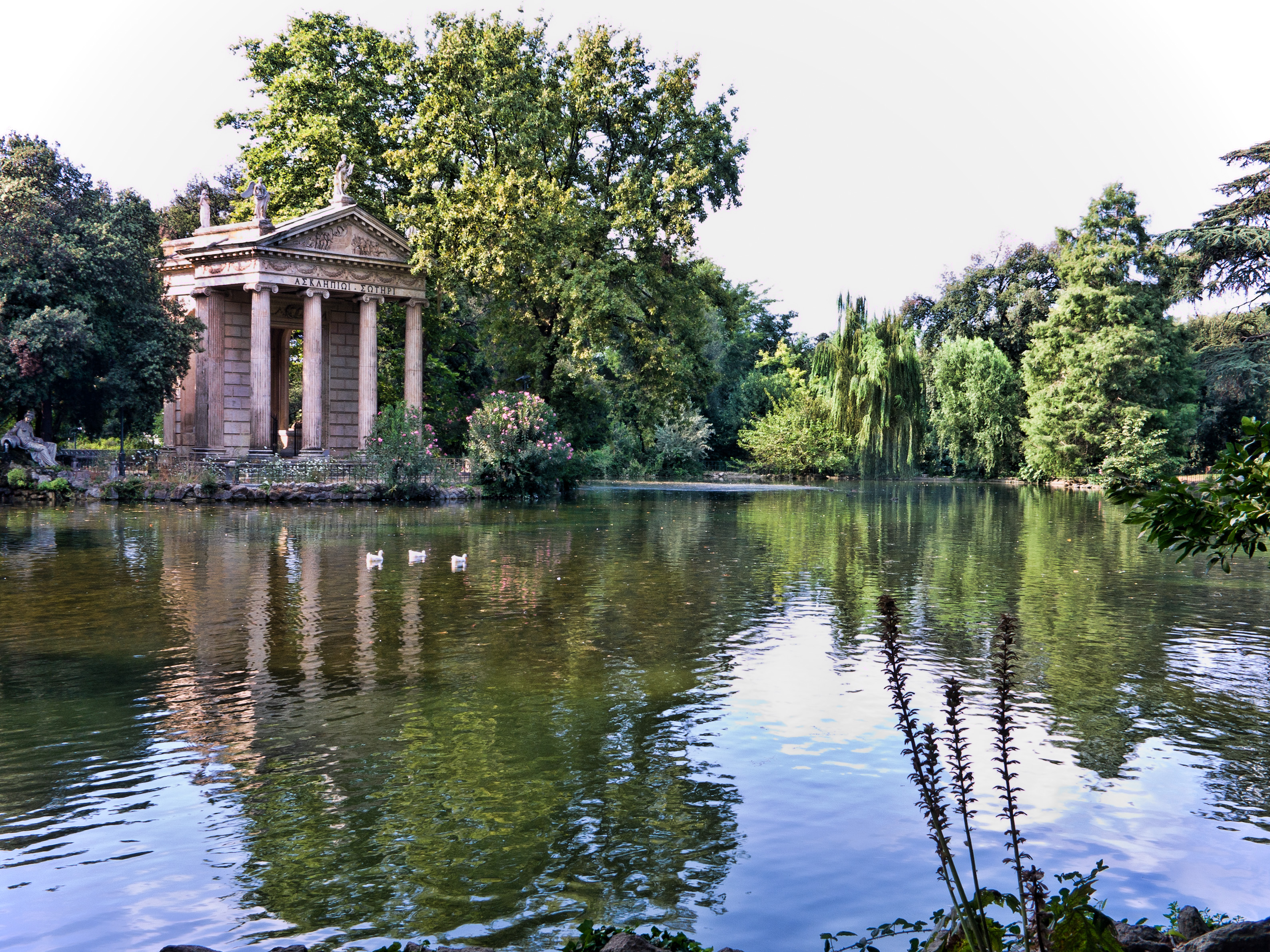
- Temple of Aesculapius

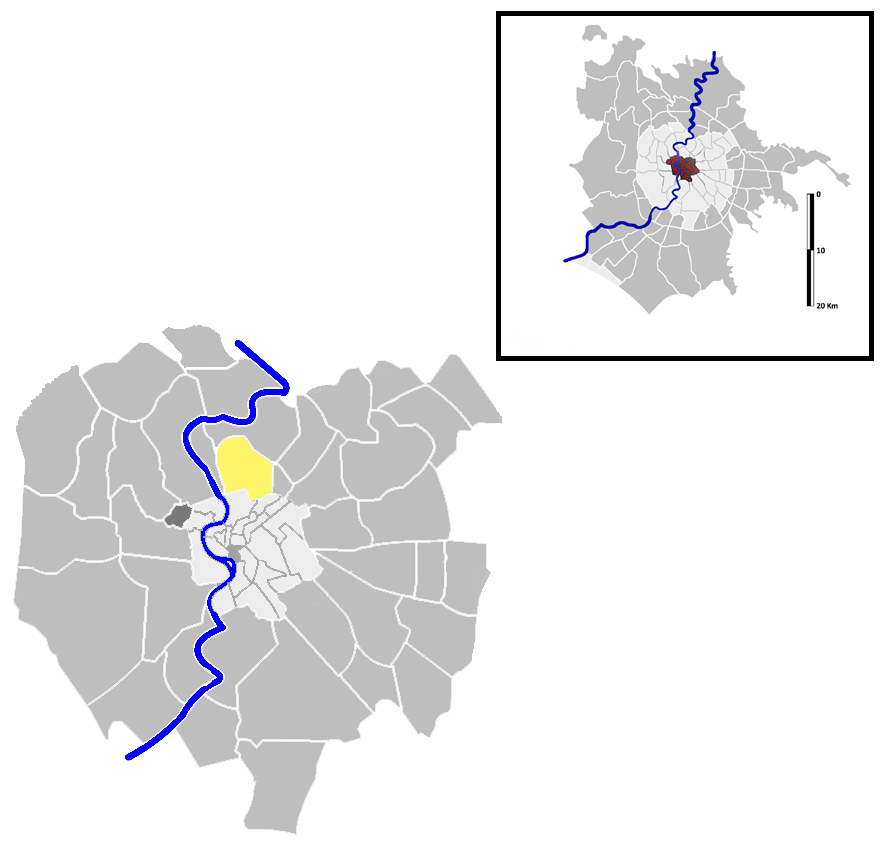
- Position of the quartiere within the city of Rome
- Country: Italy
- Region: Lazio
- Metropolitan City: Rome
- Comune: Rome
- Municipio: Municipio Roma II
- Established: 20 August 1921

Area
  - Total: 1.3769 sq mi (3.5662 km^{2})

Population
  - Total: 20,854
  - Density: 15,150/sq mi (5,848/km^{2})
- Time zone: UTC+1 (CET)
  - Summer (DST): UTC+2 (CEST)

Pinciano is the 3rd quartiere of Rome (Italy), identified by the initials Q. III. The name derives from the Pincian Hill. It belongs to the Municipio II.

== History ==
Pinciano is among the first 15 quartieri of the city, originally delimited in 1911 and officially established in 1921. Previously, it was informally called Quartiere Sebastiani or Quartiere Pinciano (limited to the part between Via Pinciana and Via Salaria) or even Quartiere dei Fiumi (District of the Rivers), since several streets, near to the border with quartiere Salario, were named after Italian rivers.

Later, the quartiere was named Vittorio Emanuele III after the King of Italy, but in 1946 it regained its original name.

=== Coat of arms ===
Vert poplar (of Nero) on or background.

== Geography ==
The quartiere is located in the northern area of the city, close to the Aurelian Walls.

=== Boundaries ===
Northward, the quartiere borders with Parioli (Q. II), from which is separated by the whole Viale Maresciallo Pilsudski, by the whole Viale dei Parioli and by the whole Viale Liegi, up to Via Salaria.

Eastward, it borders with the quartiere Salario (Q. IV), whose boundary is marked by the stretch of Via Salaria, between Viale Regina Margherita and Piazza Fiume.

Southward, it borders with the rione Ludovisi (R. XVI), the boundary being outlined by the Aurelian walls alongside Corso d'Italia, from Piazza Fiume up to Piazzale Brasile (Porta Pinciana). To the south, it also borders with the rione Campo Marzio (R. IV), from which is separated by the stretch of the Aurelian walls alongside Viale del Muro Torto, from Piazzale Brasile up to Piazzale Flaminio (Porta del Popolo).

Westward, it borders with Flaminio (R. I), whose border is marked by Via Flaminia, between Piazzale Flaminio (Porta del Popolo) and Viale Maresciallo Pilsudski.

=== Local geography ===
The main roads and squares of the quartiere are:

- Corso d'Italia and Viale del Muro Torto, two important arteries of the city, running beside the Aurelian Walls;
- Viale Bruno Buozzi, passing through the whole borough;
- Piazza Euclide, which is regarded as the center of the quartiere and is often mistakenly thought to be located in Parioli;
- Piazza Don Giovanni Minzoni, a wide rectangular square with a large garden in the middle, the Giardino Armida Barelli.

The streets and squares of the quartiere are mainly named after scientists, artists and musicians. Local toponyms can be categorized as follows:

- Astronomers, e.g. Giovanni Schiaparelli and Pietro Tacchini;
- Botanists, e.g. Ulisse Aldrovandi, Giuseppe Cuboni, Giuseppe De Notaris, Carlo Linneo, Giuseppe Mangili, Michele Mercati, Pietro Antonio Micheli, Francesco Eulalio Savastano;
- Geologists, e.g. Adolfo Cancani, Bartolomeo Gastaldi, Alessandro Serpieri;
- Mathematicians, e.g. Archimede, Giovanni Antonelli, Domenico Chelini, Guidubaldo Del Monte, Euclide, Giovanni Antonio Plana, Feliciano Scarpellini, Alberto Tonelli, Barnaba Tortolini;
- Physicians and physiologists, e.g. Carlo Allioni, Domenico Cirillo, Filippo Civinini, Luigi Luciani, Atto Tigri, Antonio Vallisneri;
- Musicians, e.g. Gregorio Allegri, Luigi Boccherini, Gaetano Donizetti, Gerolamo Frescobaldi, Benedetto Marcello, Saverio Mercadante, Giovanni Paisiello, Giovanni Pacini, Jacopo Peri, Ildebrando Pizzetti, Amilcare Ponchielli, Pietro Raimondi, Gioacchino Rossini, Nicola Spinelli, Giuseppe Verdi;
- Artists, e.g. Giuseppe Ceracchi, Sebastiano Conca, Cavalier d'Arpino, Carlo Dolci, Antonio Pollaiolo, Pomarancio, Pietro Paolo Rubens, Sassoferrato, Thorvaldsen, Ettore Ximenes;
- Politicians, e.g. Bruno Buozzi, Maresciallo Pilsudski.
- Rivers, e.g. Aniene, Cremera, Isonzo, Livenza, Po, Tevere.

== Monuments and places of interest ==
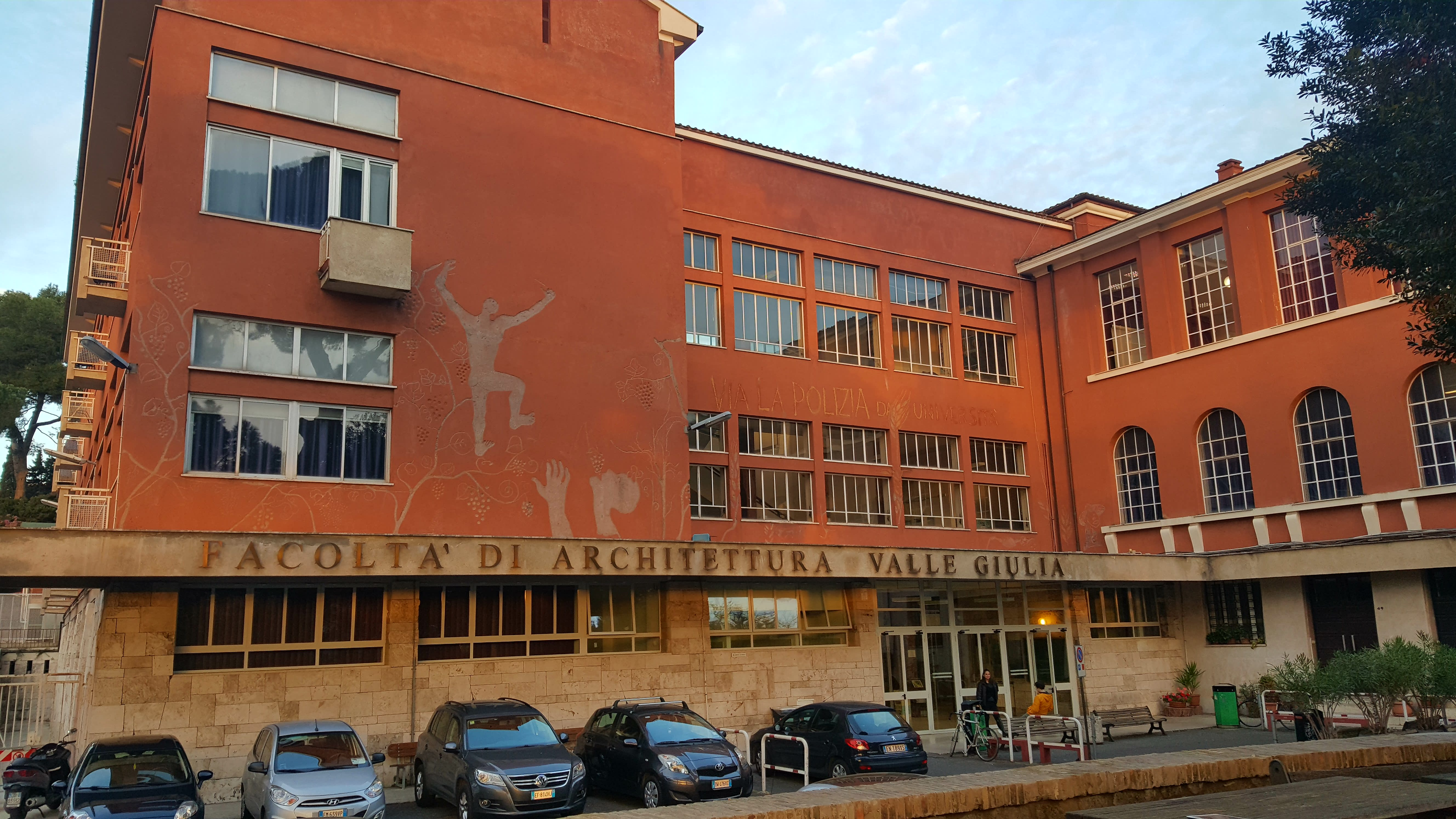
The School of Architecture of the Sapienza University of Rome.

=== Palaces and other buildings ===
- Palazzo Borromeo, on the corner of Via Flaminia and Via delle Belle Arti. 16th-century building (1561).
- Villa Strohl Fern, on Viale David Lubin. 19th-century eclectic building.
- Former Istituto Cabrini – General house of the Missionary Sisters of the Sacred Heart of Jesus, in Via Ulisse Aldovrandi. 19th-century building.

In 1981 it has been transformed into the Aldrovandi Villa Borghese Hotel.

- Villa Marignoli, in Via Po on the corner of Corso d'Italia. 20th-century building (1907).
- Villa Serena, in Via Carlo Dolci. 20th-century neogothic building (1909).

It is the project for the adaptation of a noble casino by architect Garibaldi Burba.

- Former headquarters of the Istituto Poligrafico e Zecca dello Stato, in Piazza Giuseppe Verdi. 20th-century eclectic building (1913–18)

Project by architect Garibaldi Burba. It was the seat of the Istituto until 2010.

- Villino Titta Ruffo, in Via Sassoferrato. 20th-century building (1919).
- Villa Ambron, in Via delle Tre Madonne. 20th-century building in the typical 1920s style known as Barocchetto romano (1920).

Project by architect Marcello Piacentini.

- Villino Astaldi, in Via Saverio Mercadante on the corner of Via Nicolò Porpora. 20th-century building (1920–23).
- Palazzina Marchi, in Via Giacomo Carissimi. 20th-century building (1924) in Barocchetto romano style.

Project by architect Mario Marchi.

- Villino Alatri, in Via Giovanni Paisiello. 20th-century building (1924–28).
- Palazzina Giorgi, in Via Antonio Bertoloni. 20th-century building (1927) in Barocchetto romano style.

Project by engineer Oscar Giorgi Alberti.

- Palazzina Virgili, in Via Angelo Secchi. 20th-century rationalist building (1929).

Project by architect Pietro Aschieri commissioned by Filippo Virgili. In 1933 it became the residence of the daughter of Benito Mussolini, Edda, with her husband Galeazzo Ciano.

- Palazzina Acerbo, in Via Nicolò Tartaglia. 20th-century building (1930) in Barocchetto romano style.

Project by architect Guido Fiorini commissioned by the gerarca Giacomo Acerbo. It is currently the seat of the Embassy of Venezuela.

=== Religious buildings ===
- Santa Teresa d'Ávila, minor basilica in Corso d'Italia.
- Santa Maria Immacolata a Villa Borghese, in Piazza di Siena.
- Madonna dell'Arco Oscuro, in Viale delle Belle Arti, near the National Etruscan Museum.
- Sacro Cuore Immacolato di Maria, in Piazza Euclide. 20th-century church (1923–51).
- Sant'Eugenio, minor basilica in Viale delle Belle Arti.
- Santa Teresa del Bambin Gesù in Panfilo, at the crossroads between Via Giovanni Paisiello and Via Gaspare Spontini.
- Santa Maria della Pace ai Parioli, in viale Bruno Buozzi.

=== Archaeological sites ===
- Fountain of Anna Perenna, votive fountain of the 4th century BC.

Dedicated to the homonymous Goddess, it was discovered in 1999 at the crossroads between Via Guidubaldo del Monte and Piazza Euclide.

- Mausoleum of Lucilius Paetus, in Via Salaria. Tomb of the 1st century AD.
- Catacombs of San Valentino, in Viale Maresciallo Pilsudski.

=== Gates in the Aurelian walls ===
- Porta del Popolo
- Porta Pinciana

=== Villas and parks ===
- Villa Giulia, in Viale delle Belle Arti.
- Villa Borghese
  - Casina di Raffaello, in Via della Casina di Raffaello. 17th-century building.
  - Temple of Aesculapius. 18th-century ionic tempietto (1786).
  - Temple of Diana. 18th-century monopteros tempietto (1789).
  - Villa Lubin, in Viale David Lubin. 20th-century building (1906–08).
  - Piazza di Siena.
  - Bioparco di Roma, in Viale del Giardino Zoologico.
  - Park of the Fallow deers.
  - Garden of the Lake.
  - Galoppatoio (riding track).
- Villa Balestra, in Via Bartolomeo Ammannati.
- Villa Elia, in Via di S. Valentino. It is the seat of the Embassy of Portugal to the Holy See.

== Culture ==
=== Universities and other cultural institutions ===
- School of Architecture "Valle Giulia" of the Sapienza University, in Via Antonio Gramsci.
- Istituto italiano per l'Africa e l'Oriente, in Via Ulisse Aldrovandi.
- Japanese Institute of Culture in Rome, in Via Antonio Gramsci.

=== Museums ===
- Galleria Borghese
- Galleria nazionale d'arte moderna e contemporanea (GNAM), in Viale delle Belle Arti.
- Museo Pietro Canonica
- Museo Carlo Bilotti
- Museo Civico di Zoologia
- National Etruscan Museum of Villa Giulia, in Piazzale di Villa Giulia.

== Cinema and theatre ==
The park of Villa Borghese houses the Cinema dei Piccoli and the Silvano Toti Globe Theatre.

== Bibliography ==
- Giorgio Carpaneto; others (1997). I quartieri di Roma. Rome: Newton Compton Editori.
- Alberto Manodori (1991). "QUARTIERE III. PINCIANO". I Rioni e i Quartieri di Roma. Vol. 6. Rome: Newton Compton Editori.
- Carlo Pietrangeli (1953). "Insegne e stemmi dei rioni di Roma" (PDF). Capitolium. Rassegna di attività municipali. year XXVIII (6). Rome: Tumminelli – Istituto Romano di Arti Grafiche.
- Claudio Rendina; Donatella Paradisi (2004). Le strade di Roma. Vol. 1. Rome: Newton Compton Editori.
- Claudio Rendina (2006). I quartieri di Roma. Vol. 1. Rome: Newton Compton Editori.
