= Saint Hermes =

Greek saint

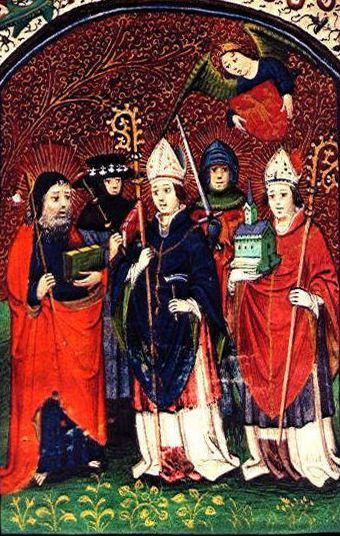
- Dutch Book of Prayers from the mid-15th century. Saint Hermes is the figure at the back, in armour. Other saints pictured include Saint James the Great, Saint Joseph, Saint Ghislain, and Saint Eligius.

Martyr
- Died: 120; Rome
- Venerated in: Catholic Church; Eastern Orthodox Church
- Canonized: Pre-congregation
- Feast: 28 August
- Patronage: Forte dei Marmi; Ronse; Acquapendente; invoked against mental illnesses

Saint Hermes, born in Greece, died in Rome as a martyr in 120, is venerated as a saint by the Catholic Church and the Eastern Orthodox Church. His name appears in the Martyrologium Hieronymianum as well as entries in the Depositio Martyrum (354). There was a large basilica over his tomb that was built around 600 by Pope Pelagius I and restored by Pope Adrian I. The Catacomb of Sant'Ermete on the Salarian Way is named after him.

== Background ==
In the Roman Rite, his feast is on 28 August. Under that date, he appears in the Roman Martyrology, the official but professedly incomplete list of saints recognized by the Catholic Church. The entry is as follows: "In the Cemetery of Basilia on the Old Salarian Way, Saint Hermes, Martyr, whom, as reported by Saint Damasus, Greece sent forth, but Rome kept as its citizen when he died for the holy name."

His existence is attested by his early cult. However, his Acts, included in those of Pope Alexander I, are legendary. They depict Hermes as a wealthy freedman who with his companions was martyred in Rome, being killed on the orders of a judge named Aurelian.

== Veneration ==
Some of his relics were given to Spoleto by Pope Gregory the Great. Other relics went to Lothair I by Pope Leo IV; Lothair brought them first to Cornelismünster, near Aachen. The relics later came to Ronse in the 9th century. During those times, Viking raids forced the monks to flee the town more than once, and the monastery was burnt by the Normans in 880. The relics were recovered in 940 and housed in a Romanesque-style crypt in 1083. The Fiertelommegang (Fiertel Procession) that has been held here since 1090, a procession with the relics throughout the city.

The church of Saint Hermes, which was later built on top of the crypt, was consecrated in 1129. A pilgrimage in honour of the saint, who had by then become known for curing mental illnesses, sustained the local economy. There is still a French saying today which translates as "Saint Hermes cures the area's madmen but keeps the Ronse dwellers as they are". Hermes is the patron saint of Ronse.

Although he is recognized as a saint of the Catholic Church, the commemoration of Saint Hermes in the General Roman Calendar was removed in 1969 because of the paucity of information about him.

== Gallery ==
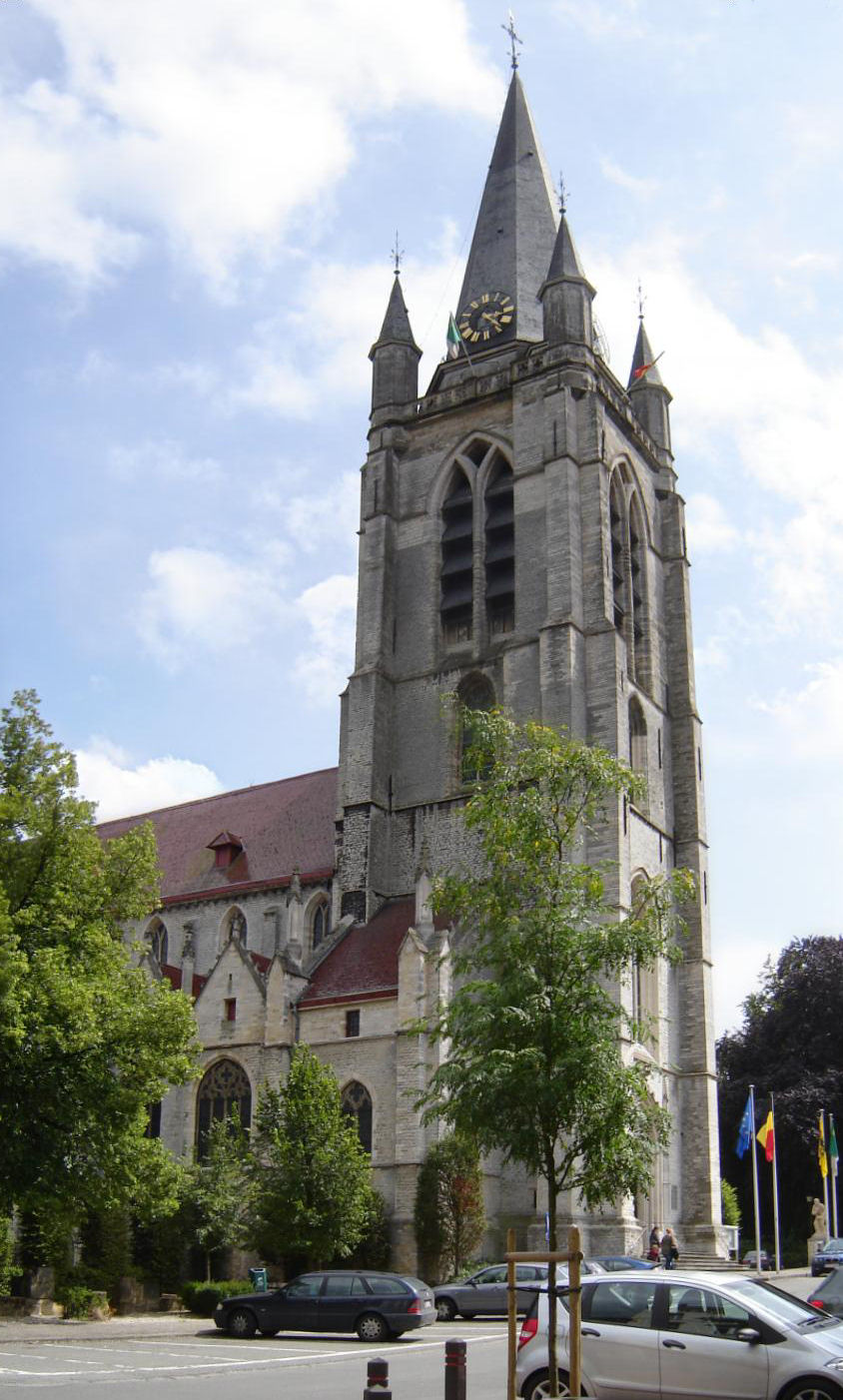
Church of Saint Hermes (Sint-Hirmes) in Ronse, Belgium.

== See also ==
- Hermas of Dalmatia
