= Flaminio (Rome) =

Coordinates: 41°55′35″N 12°28′10″E

- Quartiere of Rome
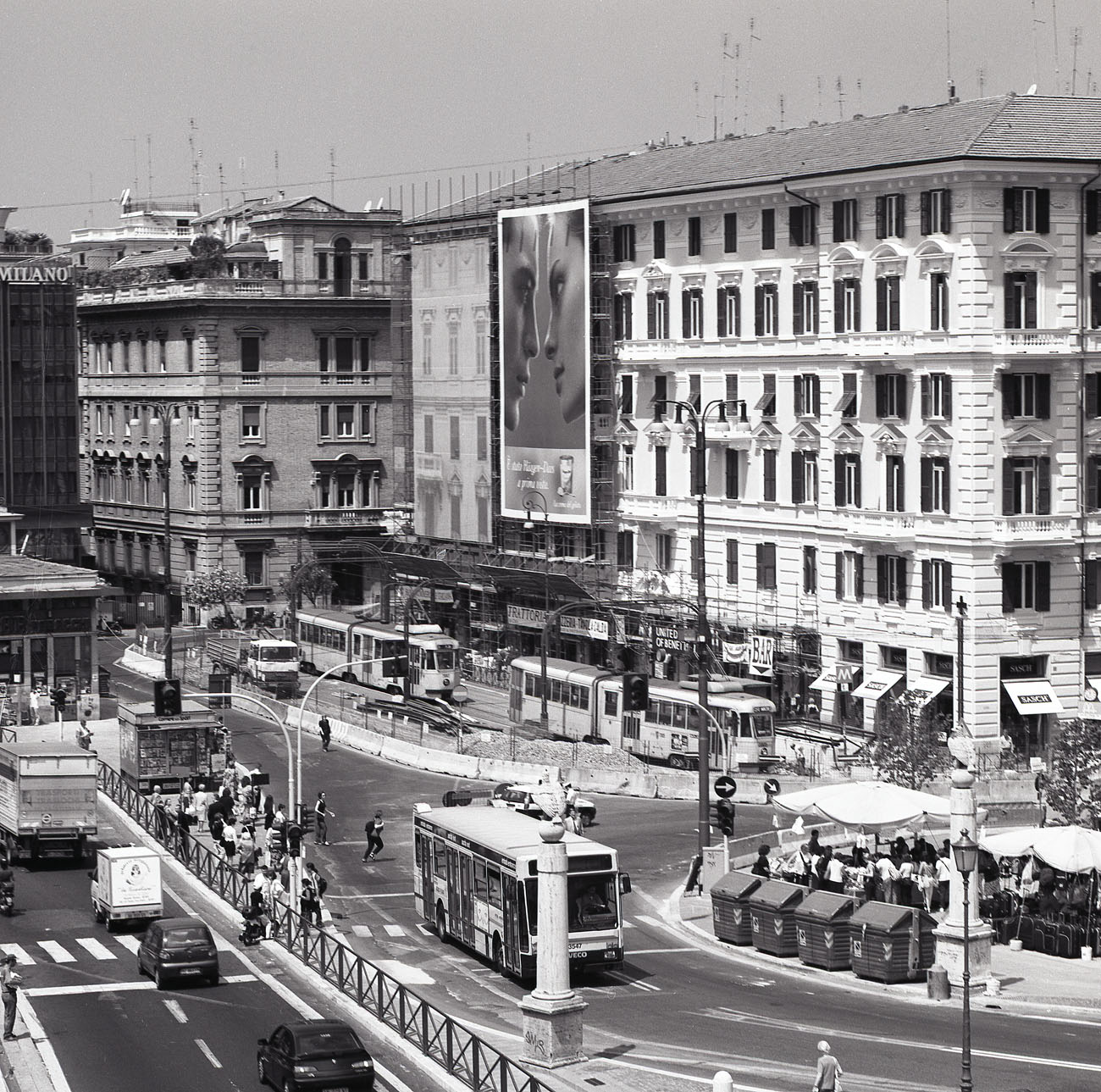
- Piazzale Flaminio

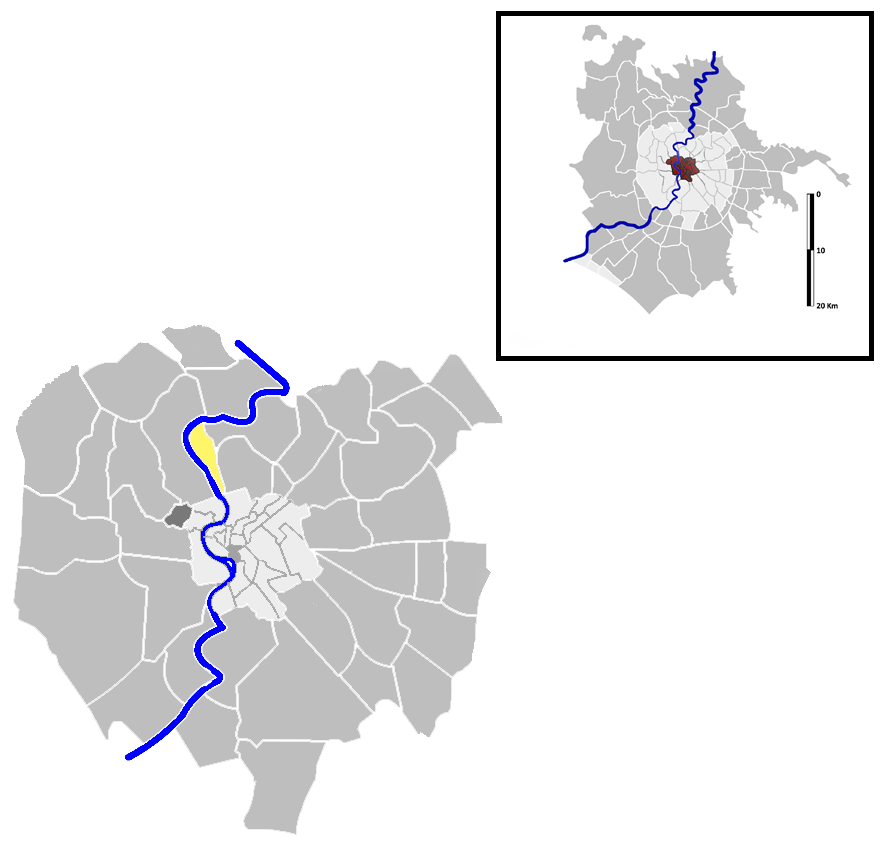
- Position of the quartiere within the city
- Country: Italy
- Region: Lazio
- Metropolitan City: Rome
- Comune: Rome
- Established: 20 August 1921

Area
  - Total: 4,586 sq mi (11,877 km^{2})

Population (2016)
  - Total: 12,155
  - Density: 2,650,610/sq mi (1,023,407/km^{2})
- Time zone: UTC+1 (CET)
  - Summer (DST): UTC+2 (CEST)

Flaminio is the 1st quartiere of the Italian capital Rome. Identified by the initials Q. I, it belongs to the Municipio II and has 13,018 inhabitants and an area of 1.1877 km ^{2}. The name is derived from the Via Flaminia.

It comprises the zona urbanistica codified as 2 C and had 13,491 inhabitants in January 2010.

== History ==
Flaminio is among the first 15 quartieri of the city, originally delimited in 1911 and officially established in 1921.

Up until the end of 19th century, the Via Flaminia reached Ponte Milvio through a flat expanse of meadows, periodically inundated by the Tiber floods. In 1905, the Società Automobili Roma chose the area in the bight of the river to build its production plants, and in the following years, along with the completion of the industrial zone, the first urban interventions start in the area between the Tiber and the Parioli hills. Hosting an International Expo in 1911, Flaminio proved itself to be a cultural and recreational district, with the subsequent construction of a racecourse (closed in 1929) and of the Galleria Nazionale d'Arte Moderna.

During the I World War, the industrial area was reconverted for military purposes: the big Società Automobili Roma plant became a weapon factory, the Reale Fabbrica di Armi, and many little constructions, with a simple and linear architecture, were built to host barracks and laboratories.

When the construction works for the new auditorium began in 1994, Flaminio and the adjacent quartiere Parioli experienced an urban renewal process that lasted more than a decade, leading to the creation of MAXXI in 2010 and to the inauguration of the new Ponte della Musica-Armando Trovajoli in 2011.

Over the years, the neighborhood has become quite renowned and is now regarded as a cultural hub due to its numerous museums and theaters. Property values are high, putting the district on par with the historic center.

== Geography ==
The territory of the quartiere includes the urban zone 2 C Flaminio.

The main arteries of the quartiere are Viale Pinturicchio, Via Guido Reni and Viale del Vignola, all connecting Via Flaminia to Piazza Gentile da Fabriano. With its central garden, dedicated to all the Italians abroad (Giardino Italiani nel Mondo), Piazza Gentile da Fabriano is one of the principal squares of the quartiere, along with Piazza Perin del Vaga, where a distinctive public house complex is located, Piazza Alighiero Boetti and Piazzale delle Belle Arti.

=== Boundaries ===
To the north and to the west, Flaminio is separated from Quartiere Della Vittoria (Q. XV) by the stretch of the Tiber between Ponte Milvio and Ponte Giacomo Matteotti.

Eastward, the quartiere borders with Parioli (Q. II), being separated by the part of Via Flaminia between Piazza Cardinal Consalvi and Viale Maresciallo Pilsudski; it also borders Pinciano, the boundary being marked by Via Flaminia itself, between Viale Maresciallo Pilsudski and Piazzale Flaminio (Porta del Popolo).

Southward, Flaminio is delimited by the Aurelian Walls (alongside Via Luisa di Savoia), that separates it from Rione Campo Marzio (R. IV).

=== Odonymy ===
In the area to the north of Piazzale delle Belle Arti, roads and squares are named after prominent artists, e.g. Alighiero Boetti, Sandro Botticelli, Luigi Canina, Carracci, Correggio, Cimabue, Donatello, Pietro da Cortona, Melozzo da Forlì, Masolino da Panicale, Perin del Vaga, Cesare Fracassini, Ferdinando Fuga, Gentile da Fabriano, Ghirlandaio, Masaccio, Girolamo Muziano, Perin del Vaga, Perugino, Pinturicchio, Guido Reni, Antoniazzo Romano, Giulio Romano, Luca Signorelli, Raffaele Stern, Giovanni Battista Tiepolo, Giorgio Vasari, Vignola, Virginio Vespignani.

In the southern area, toponyms mostly commemorate jurists and philosophers, e.g. Domenico Alberto Azuni, Cesare Beccaria, Francesco Carrara, Cardinal De Luca, Gaetano Filangieri, Emanuele Gianturco, Giovanni Vincenzo Gravina, Matteo Renato Imbriani, Pasquale Stanislao Mancini, Enrico Pessina, Giuseppe Pisanelli, Gian Domenico Romagnosi, Giambattista Vico.

== Places of interest ==
=== Civil buildings ===
- Palazzo Marina, in Lungotevere delle Navi, formerly seat of the Ministry of Navy, it now hosts the Italian Navy Chief of Staff.

=== Churches ===
- Santa Croce in Via Flaminia
- Sant'Andrea in Via Flaminia
- Sant'Andrea a Ponte Milvio

=== Museums ===
- Galleria Nazionale d'Arte Moderna
- MAXXI
- Museo Hendrik Christian Andersen

=== Other ===
- Porta del Popolo
- Monument to Giacomo Matteotti
