= Villa Balestra (Rome) =

Garden in Rome, Italy

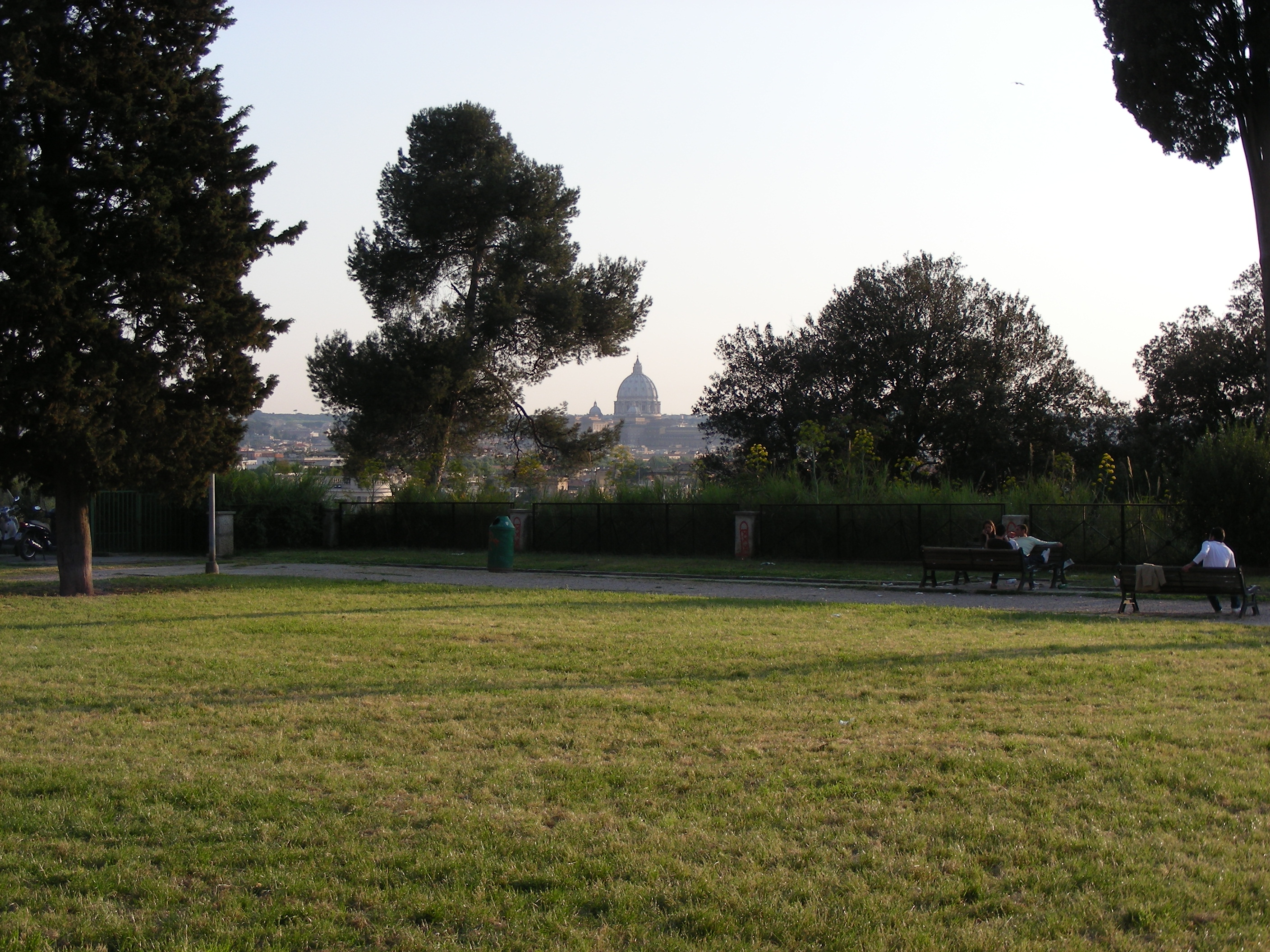
- View of Rome from the gardens of Villa Balestra.
- Interactive map of Villa Balestra
- Type: Urban park
- Location: Rome (Italy), Via Bartolomeo Ammannati 3
- Coordinates: 41°55′16″N 12°28′26″E
- Area: 1.5 ha (3.7 acres)
- Operator: Municipality of Rome

The name of Villa Balestra indicates today the homonymous urban park in Rome (Italy), located on the top of the tufaceous hill overlooking Viale Tiziano. The garden occupies the extreme offshoot of the Monti Parioli, though it belongs to the Quarter Pinciano, together with Via Bartolomeo Ammannati from which it is accessed.

== History of the villa ==
=== Villa Poggio ===
The present public garden occupies only a fairly small part of the original land of Villa Poggio, which constitutes its historical core.

The construction of the villa is due to the Bolognese cardinal Giovanni Poggio (also referred to as "Poggi"), who was the treasurer of the Apostolic Camera under Paul III and, being highly appreciated by the Pope, was subsequently sent to Spain for three years as nuncio, to collect «the spoils of all Spains» (a sort of general tax collector of the assets owed to the Pope) and then in Germany, which had recently become Lutheran. From these nunciatures he returned a rich man and decided to invest in properties the resources he had accumulated; in Rome he built Villa Poggio, which however did not belong to him for long.

Nonetheless, in 1834 an encyclopedic dictionary of sciences, letters and arts compiled by Antonio Bazzarini still described the Villa – generally called "Poggi" at the time – as «Villa Poggi outside Porta del Popolo in Rome, where cardinals and ambassadors now stop when they make their public entrance to receive the compliments of the gentry».

=== Villa Balestra ===
After being passed from hand to hand – the Colonna among others – Villa Poggi was purchased in 1880 by cavalier Giuseppe Balestra, who successfully devoted the agricultural area to vineyards.

=== The allotment ===
The Villa was dismembered starting in 1910. In 1928 a part of the park was saved and opened to the public and in 1939 the Municipality of Rome could complete its purchase. The part, which had remained in private hands, was parcelled out and built up around the 1950s.

Of the original park – which included several buildings, partly no longer existing and partly become dismembered and isolated edifices – only a portion remains. All the main buildings of the former sixteenth-century Villa are now located outside the perimeter of the park of Villa Balestra and are all privately owned:

- Casino nobile: it boasts a loggia which, according to Vasari, was frescoed by Pellegrino Tibaldi.
- Villa Parodi Delfino: it is assumed that once it was a stable, then the former dining room of the Villa; it is located in Via Bartolomeo Ammannati, 21.
- Casa del Maresciallo: in Via Bartolomeo Ammannati, at the corner with Via dei Monti Parioli; in the 1950s it was turned into a modern cottage.

== The public garden of Villa Balestra ==
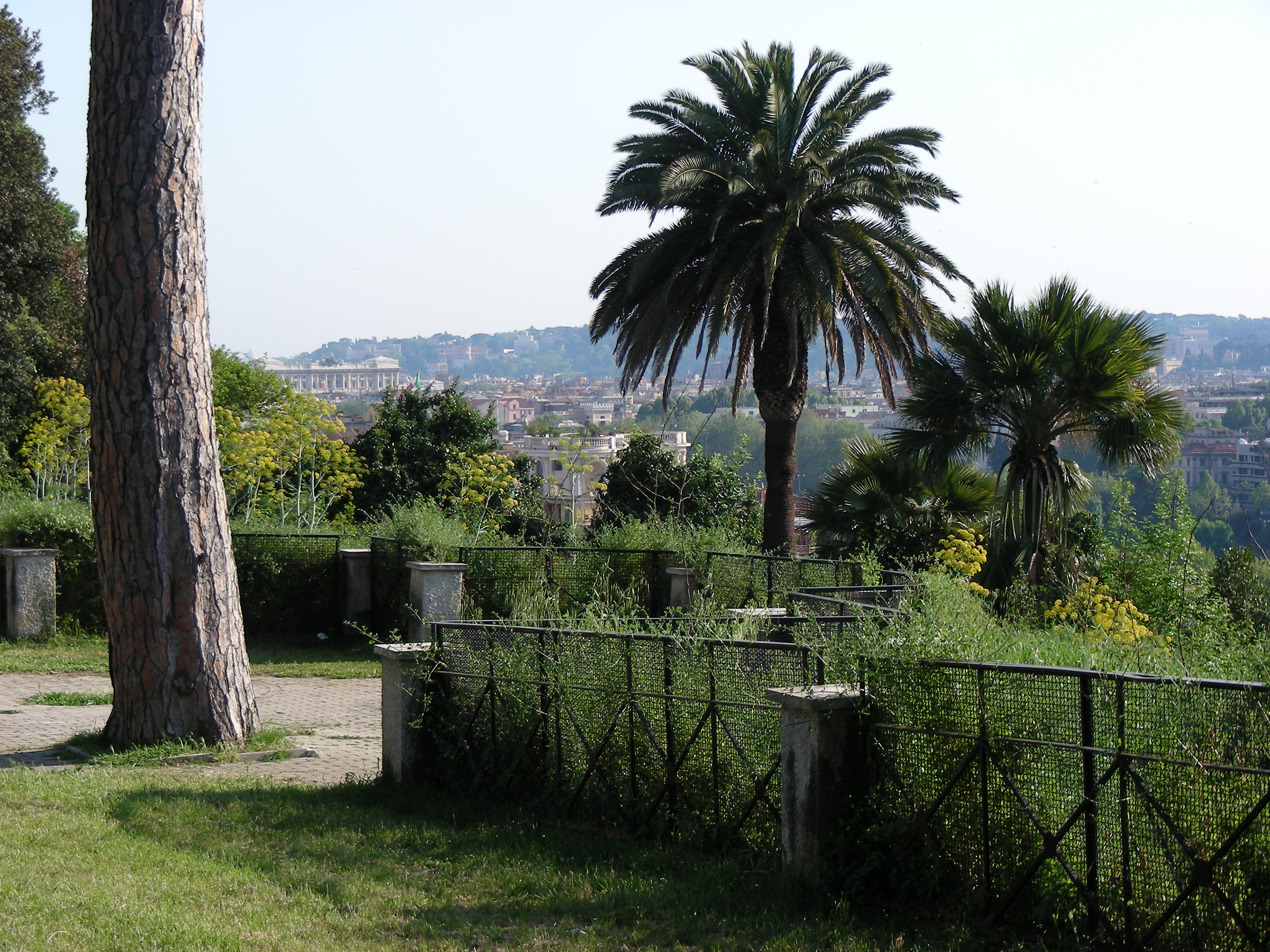
View from the gardens towards Monte Mario.

The current area of public gardens, owned by the Municipality of Rome, covers an area of little less than 1.5 ha (3.7 acres); it has an elliptical shape and is divided into two parallel avenues and three large flowerbeds with high-trunk trees. The garden also includes a small sloping area, a sort of "thicket" used as an area for dogs (to the left of the main gate) and a space housing a refreshment point equipped with recreational activities for children (on the opposite side). Along the slopes of the hill, overlooking Viale Tiziano, there is a vast green area featuring thick vegetation and caves dug into the tuff halfway up the hill.

In 1964, the garden inspired the song L'orchestra di Villa Balestra, written by Renato Rascel for the musical comedy Il giorno della tartaruga by Garinei and Giovannini.
