= Parioli =

Coordinates: 41°55′55.57″N 12°29′12.55″E

- Quartiere of Rome
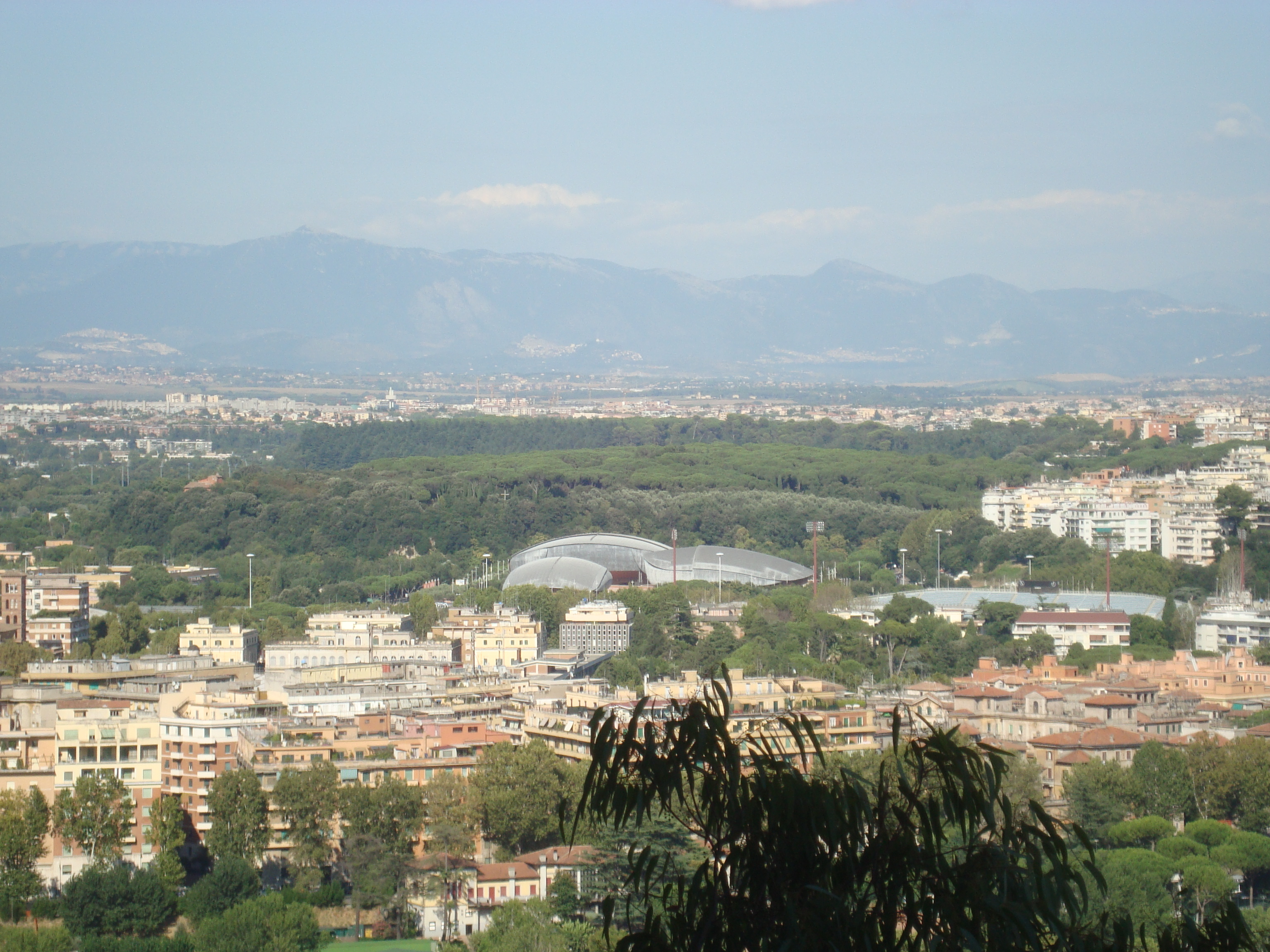
- A view of Parioli seen from Monte Mario

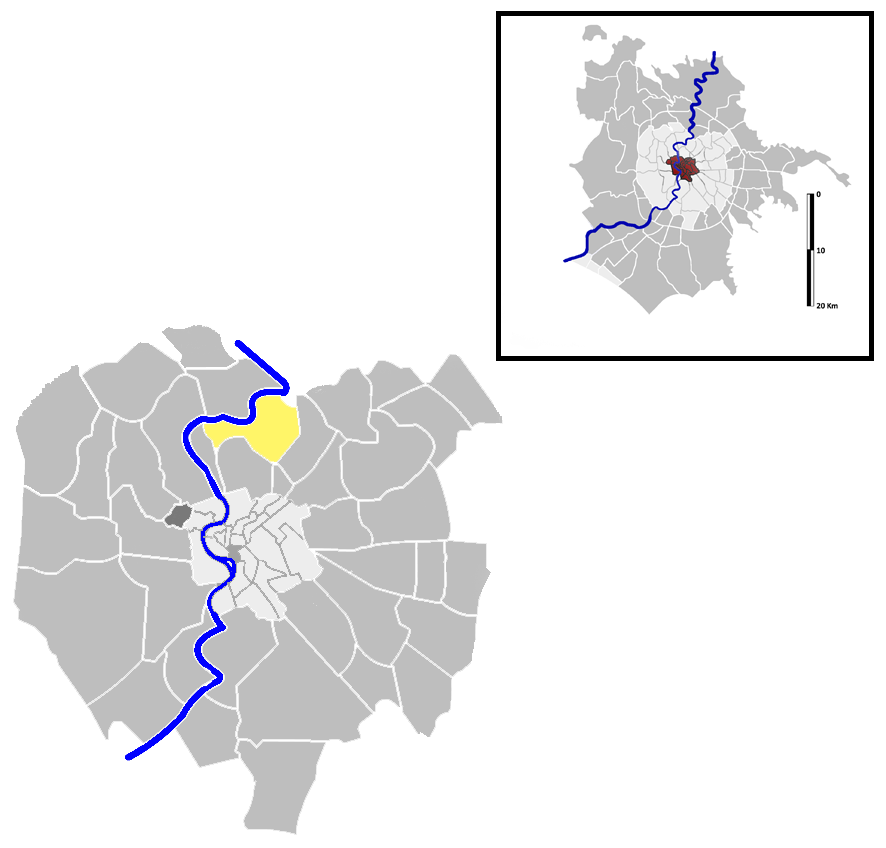
- Position of the quartiere within the city of Rome
- Country: Italy
- Region: Lazio
- Province: Rome
- Comune: Rome

Area
  - Total: 1.8342 sq mi (4.7506 km^{2})

Population (2016)
  - Total: 13,749
  - Density: 749,580/sq mi (289,416/km^{2})
- Demonym: Pariolini
- Time zone: UTC+1 (CET)
  - Summer (DST): UTC+2 (CEST)

Parioli (Italian pronunciation: [paˈrjɔːli]) is the 2nd quartiere of Rome, identified by the initials Q. II.

The toponym is also used to indicate the urban area 2B of the Municipio Roma II.

The name comes from Monti Parioli, a series of tufa hills, and was given to the area before its incorporation into the city proper at the beginning of the 20th century. Some suggest that the name stems from peraioli ("pear harvesters"), as it was once the site of pear orchards.

== History ==
Parioli is among the first 15 quartieri of the city that were built beyond the Aurelian Walls, originally delimited in 1911 and officially established in 1921.

Parioli began as an upper-class district in the first years of 20th century, with the construction of Viale Parioli, sponsored by two major landowners of the area, Filonardi and Giorgi. In their project, the new thoroughfare is conceived as a "city promenade", a tree-lined street with a lateral riding track and flanked by elegant houses. Viale Parioli was then extended up to Viale Liegi, and two more boulevards were built, Viale Tiziano and Viale Maresciallo Pilsudski: however, the construction of new buildings turned out to be quite difficult, because of the peculiar orography of the area, and following the failure of some development companies, further construction was paused.

According to the development plan drafted by engineer Edmondo Sanjust di Teulada in 1909, only detached houses and cottages with vast gardens were intended to rise up in the future urbanization, but in 1922 a specific regulation defined apartment houses without garden as the building archetype for the borough.

During the Fascist regime, Parioli was the residence of many high-ranking party and state functionaries. Urbanization was completed in the 1950s, and today, Parioli is known as Rome's most elegant residential area. A number of foreign embassies are located there.

== Geography ==
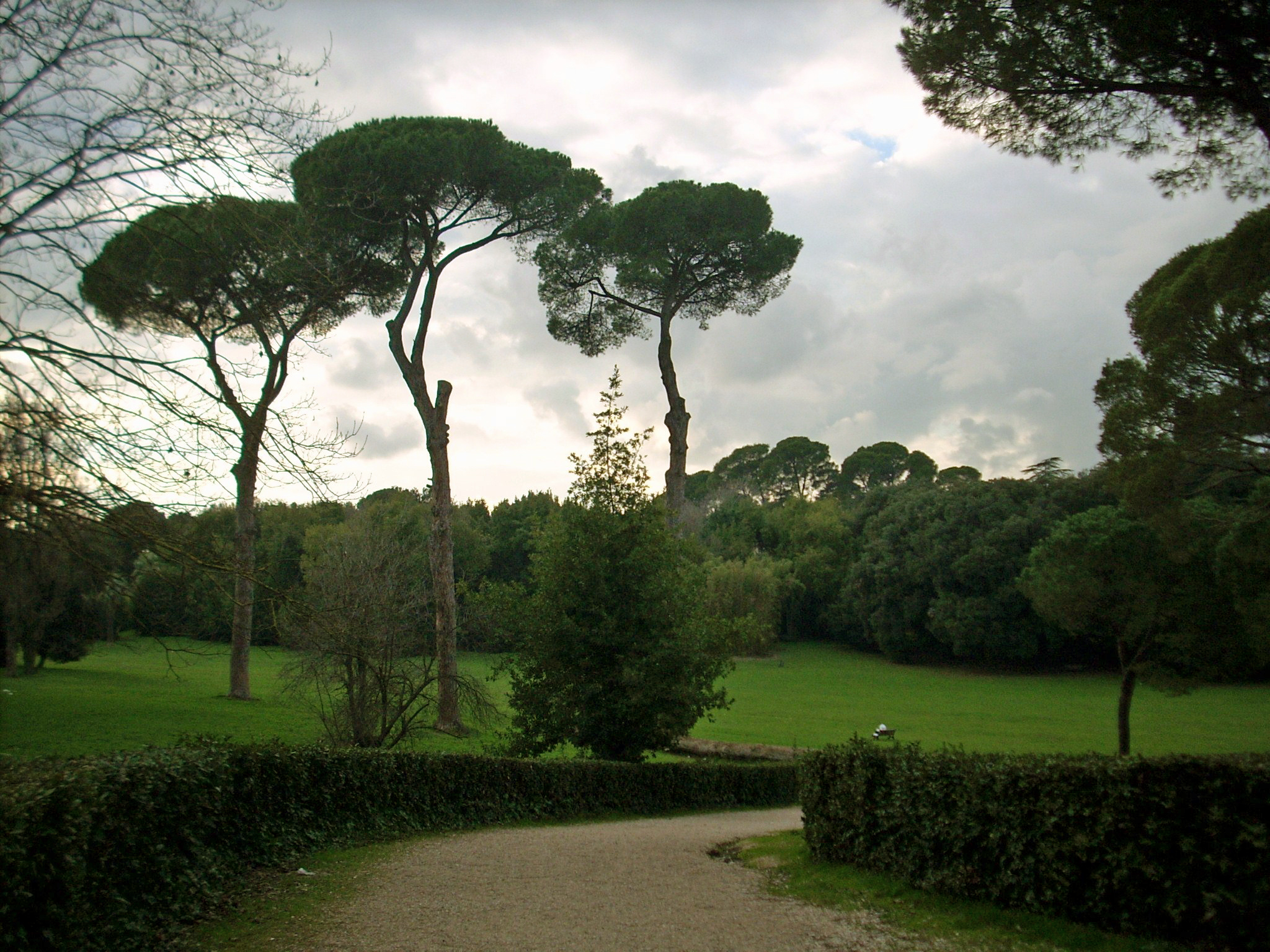
View of Villa Ada.

The quartiere is in the northern area of the town, close to the left bank of the Tiber.

The area extends approximately from Via Salaria and the end of Viale Regina Margherita, to the slope descending towards the Tiber and the Museum of Modern Art, in the Viale delle Belle Arti. The other two sides are approximately delineated by Villa Borghese and Villa Ada. In 19th century, Viale Regina Margherita was a tree-lined avenue that led from the neighborhood of the San Lorenzo district to the fields of Monti Parioli.

The territory of the quarter includes the urban zones 2A Villaggio Olimpico and 2B Parioli.

=== Boundaries ===
Northward, the quartiere borders with Quartiere Tor di Quinto (Q. XVIII), separated from Parioli by the stretch of the Tiber between Ponte Milvio and the river Aniene, and with Zona Val Melaina (Z. I), whose border is defined by the stretch of the river Aniene between its immission in the Tiber and Ponte Salario.

To the east, Parioli borders with Quartiere Trieste (Q. XVII), the boundary being marked by Via Salaria, between Ponte Salario and Viale Liegi.

Southward, it borders with Quartiere Salario (Q. IV), whose border is marked by Viale Liegi and with Quartiere Pinciano (Q. III): it is separated from Parioli by Viale dei Parioli and by Viale Maresciallo Pilsudski, all the way to Via Flaminia.

Westward, the quartiere borders with Quartiere Flaminio (Q. I), the boundary being the stretch of Via Flaminia between Viale Maresciallo Pilsudski and Piazza Cardinal Consalvi.

=== Local geography ===
Main roads in the area are:

- Viale dei Parioli, a wide, tree lined avenue extending from Piazza Ungheria to villa Glori and to the Acqua Acetosa fountain.
- Via dei Monti Parioli, a small street at the summit of the neighborhood, overlooked by elegant residential buildings: here the Belgian and Serbian Embassies are located, as well as the Monte Parioli English School, for children under 10 years old.
- Viale Tiziano, a huge tree-lined avenue which flanks the Via Flaminia.
- Viale della Moschea, where the Mosque of Rome is located.
- Viale della XVII Olimpiade, the main artery of the Villaggio Olimpico.
- Corso Francia, a major artery of the northern area of the city.

Other roads and squares of the district are chiefly named after nations and cities. Odonyms of Parioli can be categorized as follows:

- Nations, e.g. Via Austria, Via Belgio, Via Canada, Via Colombia, Piazza Cuba, Via Danimarca, Via Finlandia, Via Gran Bretagna, Via India, Via Irlanda, Via Jugoslavia Piazza Lituania, Via Panama, Via Paraguay, Viale Romania, Piazza Ungheria, Via Unione Sovietica, Via Uruguay, Via Venezuela.
- Cities, e.g. Piazza Bligny, Via Lima, Via Lisbona, Via Lutezia, Via Montevideo, Piazza Santiago del Cile.
- Writers who fought in the WWI, e.g. Via Giosuè Borsi, Via Ruggero Fauro, Via Vittorio Locchi, Via Nino Oxilia, Via Scipio Slataper, Via Carlo Stuparich.
- Olympic athletes and Olympics related names, e.g. Viale Pietro de Coubertin, Via Giulio Gaudini, Via Nedo Nadi, Via Dorando Pietri.
- Actors, e.g. Via Eleonora Duse, Via Leopoldo Fregoli, Via and Largo Sergio Leone, Via Anna Magnani, Via Ermete Novelli, Via Ettore Petrolini, Via Giacinta Pezzana, Via Adelaide Ristori, Via Tommaso Salvini.

== Places of interest ==
=== Archaeological sites ===
- Remains of Antemnae
- Villa dell'Auditorium, rediscovered in 1995 during the construction works of Parco della Musica
- Catacombs of Sant'Ilaria and the Iordani

=== Religious buildings ===
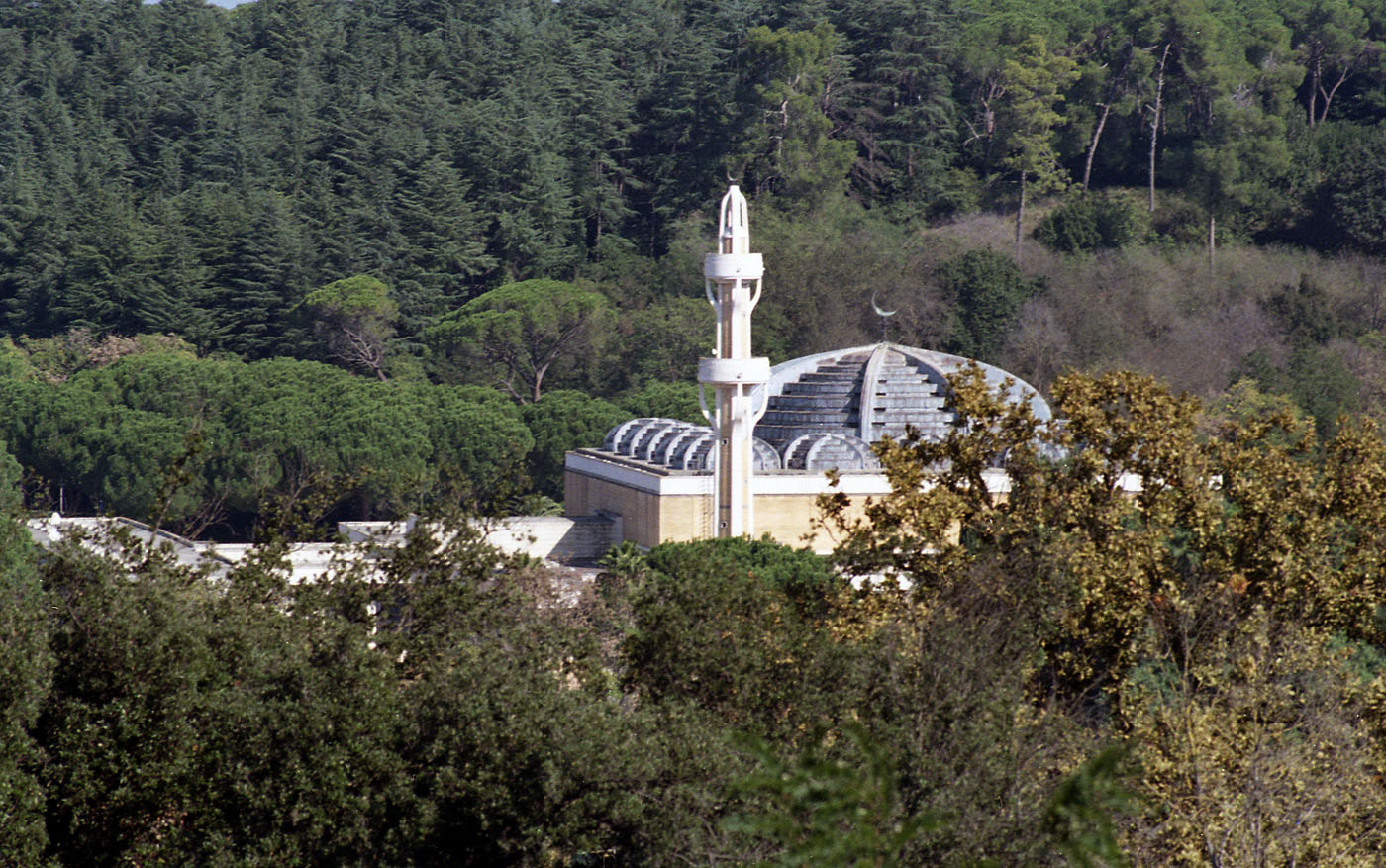
The Mosque of Rome seen from Piazza delle Muse

- San Roberto Bellarmino
- Mosque of Rome

=== Parks ===
- Villa Balestra
- Villa Ada
- Villa Glori
