= Catacomb of Sant'Ermete =

The Catacomb of Sant' Ermete or Catacomb of Bassilla is a catacomb on the former via Salaria in Rome, now sited in the Pinciano district on via Berolini. It originated some time between 200 and 250.

It was one of the first catacombs to be rediscovered, when in 1576 the Jesuits were building a college for their students on its site. Antonio Bosio explored and studied it in December 1608. Recent excavations have uncovered a semi-underground basilica with Hermes, Protus and Hyacinth's original grave sites and a medieval oratory, the latter of which suggests a monastery at the site, though this is unmentioned in the written sources.

== Name ==
The earliest name is after Bassilla, possibly the owner of the land on which it was built between 200 and 250, possibly the martyr recorded on 22 September in the Depositio martyrum who had died in Diocletian's persecution in 304, or possibly two people both named Bassilla. 'Sant' Ermete' links it to saint Hermes, the best known martyr buried in it. The earliest sources make it the burial site of the martyrs Bassilla, Hermes and Protus and Hyacinth, all confirmed by inscriptions excavated from the catacomb and now in the Museo Pio Cristiano. Catalogues for medieval pilgrims add Crispus, Ercolanus, Leopardus, Victor and Maximilian or Maximus, but details of these extra saints' lives and deaths remain uncertain, confused and almost non-existent and no tomb monuments to them have been found in the catacomb. The Notitia ecclesiarum urbis Romae, also for pilgrims, attests to the existence of a basilica dedicated to Bassilla, of which all trace is lost.

== Description ==
It is on three levels and recent studies have found evidence in the subsoil for an ancient above-ground necropolis. Its three major art-historical features are the semi-underground basilica of Sant' Ermete, the medieval oratory and the crypt of Protus and Hyacinth.

=== Basilica ===
Bosio was the first to identify the environment, finding an inscription confirming the basilica's dedication to Hermes. It was built among very ancient earlier structures - some scholars such as Giuseppe Marchi identify these as the nymphaeum of a Roman villa, abandoned early in the 3rd century and converted to house human remains. Here Saint Hermes was buried, with the nyphaeum's crypt converted into a basilica under Pope Damasus I (366–384). It was renovated and restored several times in the following centuries and in the modern era. An apse with a cathedra and a matroneum are all that remain of the basilica, whilst the current roof was built by the Jesuits at the end of the 17th century. From the basilica one can access the underground galleries.

=== Oratory ===
In the medieval era, on the left side of the basilica, a monastic oratory was opened. In 1940 the archaeologist Sandro Carletti discovered a niche with 11th - 12th century frescoes, including a bust of a long-haired bearded Christ with angels, an enthroned Madonna and child with the archangels Gabriel and Raphael and Saints Hermes, John the Evangelist and Benedict.

=== Crypt ===
The burials of Protus and Hyacinth were affected in ancient times by landscapes, forcing Damasus I to rebuild their crypt completely to improve its condition, particularly the pavement. This hid Hyacinth's original niche from view and left Protus' unidentified until in the 19th century Marchi rediscovered an inscription with the words "sepulcrum Proti" (Protus' tomb). Hyacinth's original niche was rediscovered on 21 March 1845, still perfectly closed and conserved with burned bones (probably a sign he was martyred by fire) and gold threads. The marble slab closing the niche was inscribed Dp III septebr Yacinthus martyr - a copy is now on the site, with the original kept in the Pontifical Urban University on the Janiculum.

== Bibliography (in Italian) ==
- De Santis L. - Biamonte G., Le catacombe di Roma, Newton & Compton Editori, Roma 1997
- De Rossi G. B., La cripta dei SS. Proto e Giacinto nel cimitero di S. Ermete presso la Salaria Vetere, in Bollettino di Archeologia Cristiana, Serie V, 4 (1894) 5-34
