= Catacomb of the Iordani =

Ancient catacomb in Rome, Italy

The Catacomb of the Iordani (Italian - Catacomba dei Giordani) is a catacomb on the left side of the ancient via Salaria in Rome, under the modern villa Ada in the Parioli quarter. It is named after the family who owned the land in which it was excavated and was badly damaged by relic-hunters and tomb-robbers before being rediscovered.

== History ==
It dates to between the second half of the 3rd century and the first half of the 5th century, with inscriptions dating to 269 and 436. It was rediscovered in 1720 by the archaeologists Marcantonio Boldetti and Giovanni Marangoni, but it was initially mistaken for the catacomb of Trasone. As late as 1873 the archaeologist Giovanni Battista de Rossi identified it as the catacomb of Priscilla, whilst the Jesuit Raffaele Garrucci continued to identify it as the catacomb of Trasone.

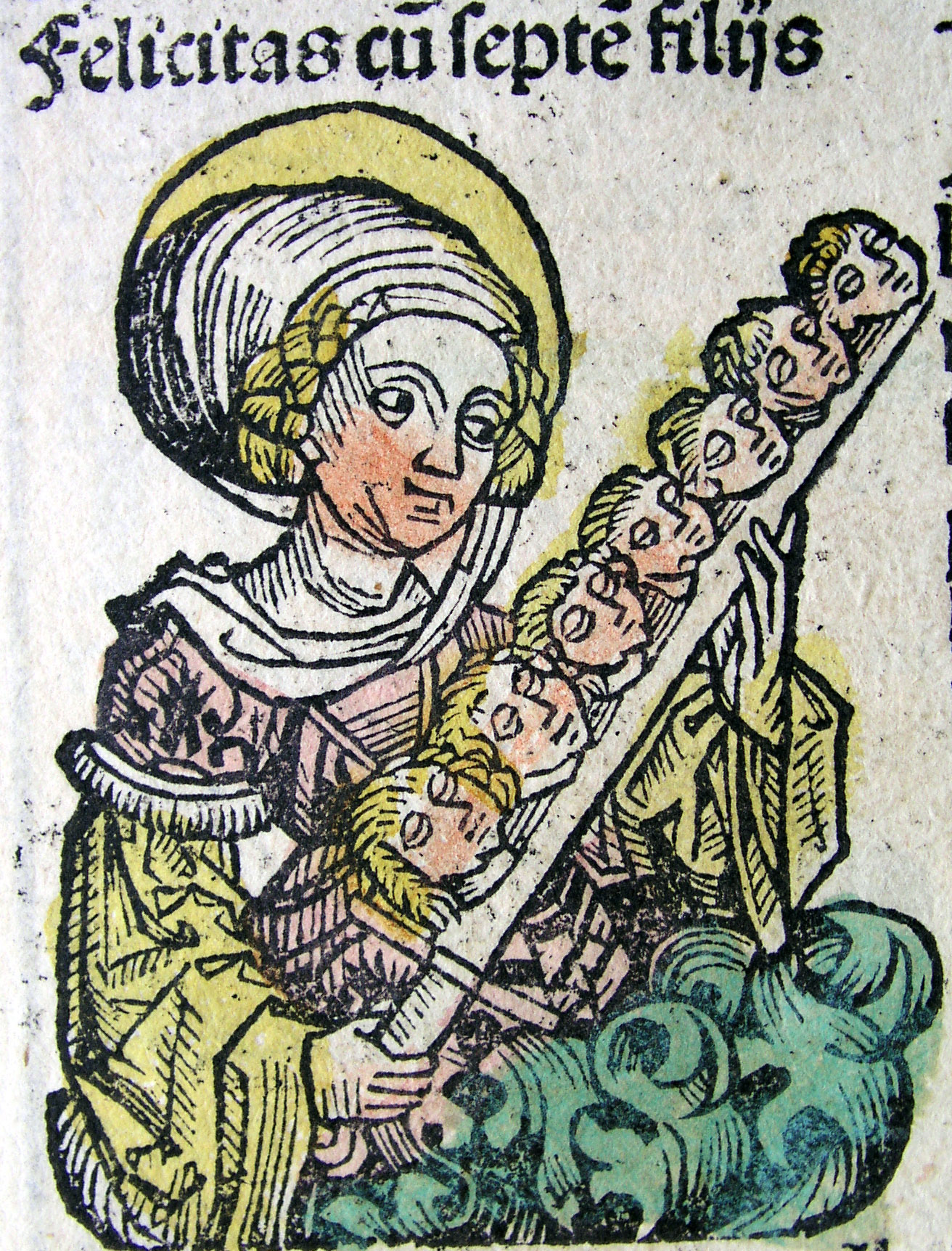
Medieval woodcut of Saint Felicitas and her seven sons, three of whom are buried in the Catacomb of the Iordani.

This confusion lasted until 1966, when the Pontifical Commission for Sacred Archaeology's excavation allowed it to be identified as the catacomb of the Giordani, mainly thanks to the discovery of the crypt containing the remains of the martyr Alexander, which several ancient literary sources state was "in the cemetery of the Iordanii". Fragments of three marble slabs of different eras dedicated to the saint were also found:

- installed by Pope Damasus I (4th century), sculpted by his collaborator Furius Dionysius Filocalus, but destroyed during the Goths' Siege of Rome (537–538)
- its replacement under Pope Vigilius, with the fragments of the last line showing the name 'Alexander'
- a vow made by a certain Marcellus in the 5th century

The complex also contains the 'cubiculum of the Exodus', completely covered in 4th century frescoes of scenes from the Book of Exodus, particularly on the vault, which is rare in catacombs. The same literary sources mention the remains of the martyrs Martial and Vitale as being buried in the same cemetery as Alexander's - all of them were traditionally held to be sons of Felicitas of Rome.

The earliest of the written sources, the Chronograph of 354, attests that the three martyrs were buried on the via Salaria on 10 July. The Martyrologium Hieronymianum adds that seven virgin martyrs (Donata, Paolina, Rogata, Dominanda, Serotina, Saturnina and Hilaria) were buried in the same tomb as Alexander and his brothers on 31 December. The Notitia ecclesiarum urbis Romae states that the site had an above-ground basilica dedicated to the martyrs Martial and Vitale - nothing now remains of that building, but its ruins were seen at the end of the 16th century by Antonio Bosio. The only archaeological confirmation of these facts in the literary sources is the tomb of Alexander.

== Bibliography (in Italian) ==
- (in Italian) Leonella De Santis; Giuseppe Biamonte (1997). Le catacombe di Roma. Roma: Newton Compton Editori. pp. 172–174. ISBN 978-88-541-2771-5.
- (in Italian) Antonio Ferrua; Antonio Ferrua (1967). "Antichità cristiane. I lavori di papa Vigilio nelle catacombe". La Civiltà Cattolica II: 142–148.
- (in Italian) Antonio Ferrua (1967). "Antichità cristiane. Santa Felicita e i suoi sette figli". La Civiltà Cattolica II: 248–251.
- (in Italian) Umberto Maria Fasola (1972). "Le recenti scoperte delle catacombe sotto villa Savoia. Il "coemeterium Iordanorum ad S. Alexandrum"". Actas del VIII Congreso Internacional de Arqueologia Cristiana, Barcelona 5-11 Octubre 1969. Città del Vaticano: 273–297.
- Massimiliano Ghilardi (15 April 2010). "Quae signa erant illa, quibus putabant esse significativa Martyrii?". Mélanges de l'École Française de Rome. Italie et Méditerranée (in Italian and English). 122–1 (122–1): 81–106. doi:10.4000/mefrim.561.
