= Lungotevere delle Navi =

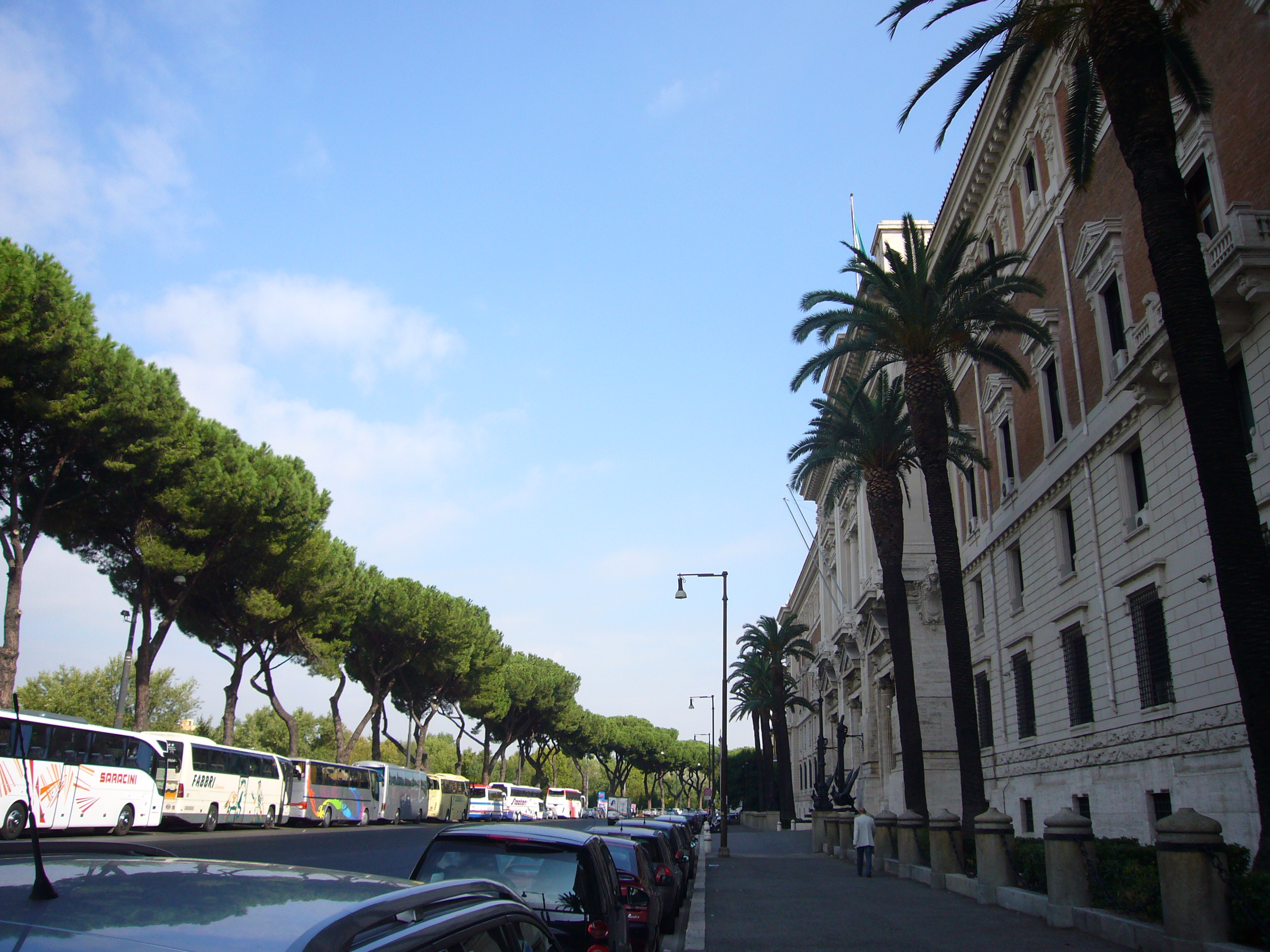
Palazzo Marina and the lungotevere

Lungotevere delle Navi is the stretch of lungotevere linking Ponte Giacomo Matteotti to Piazzale delle Belle Arti in Rome, in the Flaminio district.

The lungotevere is named after the Italian Navy, whose ministry is located in the avenue; it was established by resolution of the Governor of 7 May 1928.

The palazzo della Marina, set of the Ministry offices, was built between 1924 and 1928 and designed by Giulio Magni in 1914. Of Neo-Baroque style, the façade features two anchors that mark the entrance, which belonged to the Austrian battleships Viribus Unitis and Tegetthoff, sunken on 1 November 1918 in Pula.

In correspondence of Lungotevere delle Navi, between Ponte Matteotti and Ponte Risorgimento, is located an "Urban Oasis of the Tiber", in custody to WWF since 1989.

== Sources ==
- Rendina, Claudio; Paradisi, Donatella (2004). Le strade di Roma. Volume secondo E-O. Rome: Newton Compton Editori. ISBN 88-541-0209-1.
