= Via Anapo catacombs =

Catacombs on the via Salaria in Rome

Coordinates: 41.9264°N 12.5060°E

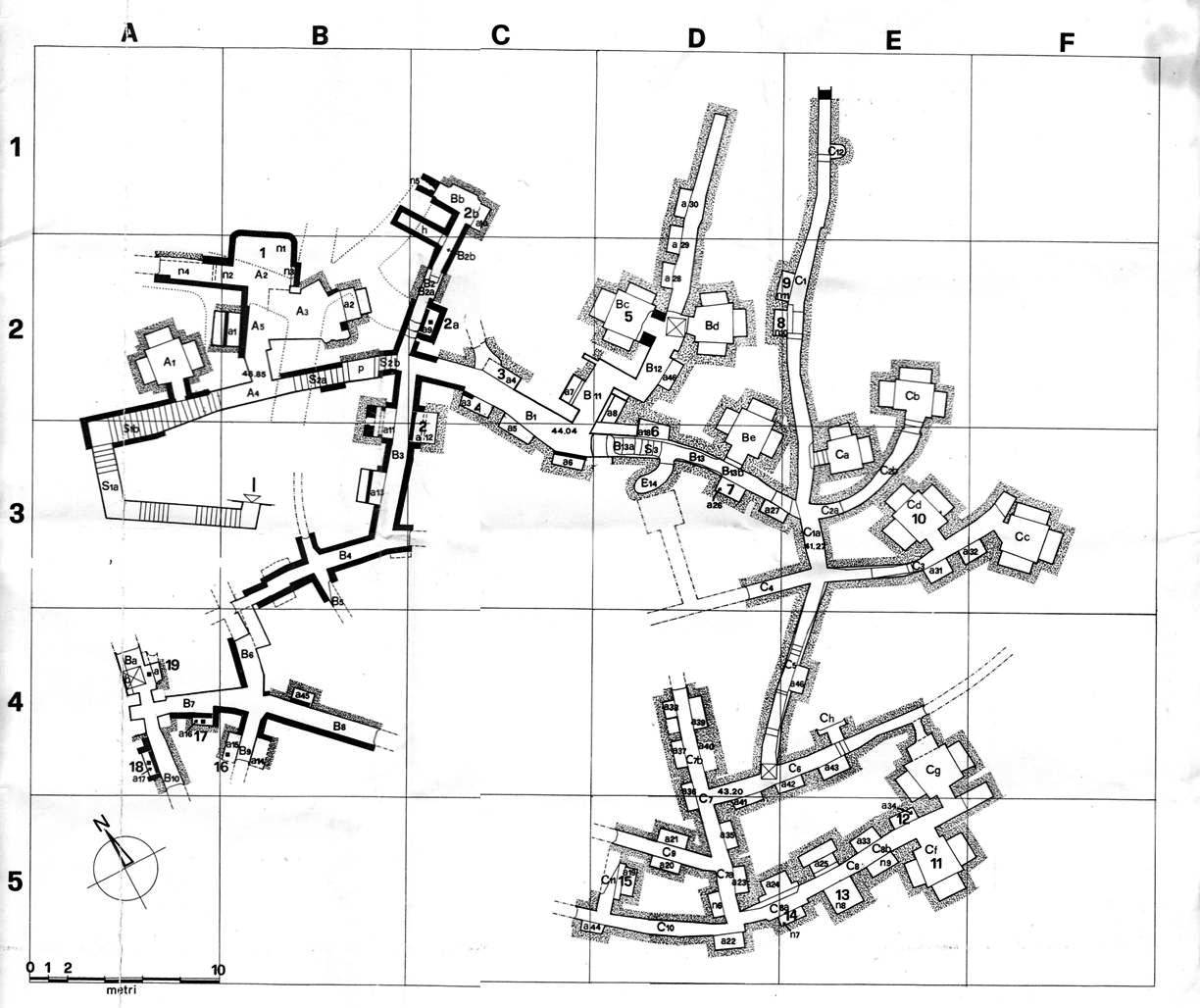
Plan of the catacombs

The Via Anapo catacombs or Anonima di Via Anapo (anonymous catacombs of Via Anapo) are a set of catacombs on the Via Salaria in Rome, first built in the 3rd–4th centuries and rich in wall paintings, inscriptions, and sarcophagus fragments. They were discovered on 31 May 1578 when some workers digging for pozzolana witnessed a landslide, only for the complex to be lost in another landslide and rediscovered again in the early 20th century.

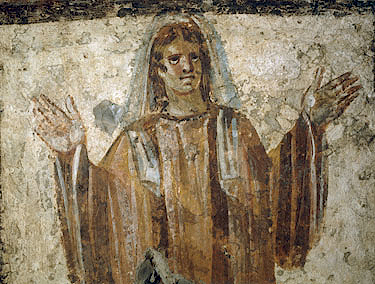
Fresco of a praying woman, an orante or orans, in the Anonima di Via Anapo catacomb (anonymous catacomb of Via Anapo), Rome

No bodies were found in it, probably since they had been translated to cemeteries during the 9th century. Soon after its rediscovery, it became a popular destination for pilgrims, scholars, and Oratorians, the third of whom used the site to reinforce the Counter-Reformation Catholic position during the 16th century.

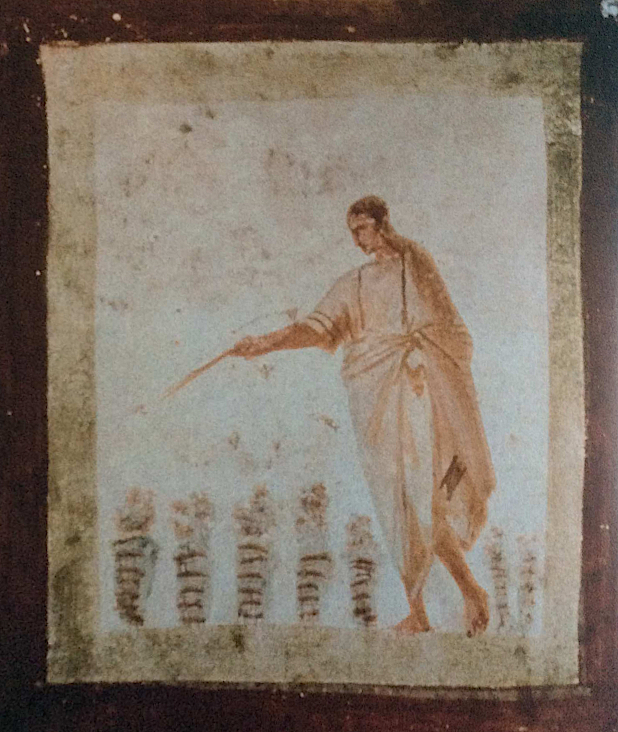
4th century A.D., Rome. Christ multiplies the loaves of bread, anonymous catacomb of via Anapo.
