= Ponte di Quintodecimo =

- Coordinates: 42°45′47″N 13°23′08″E
- Carries: Via Salaria
- Crosses: Tronto
- Locale: Quintodecimo, Italy

Characteristics
- Design: Arch bridge
- Material: Travertine
- Width: 3.8 m
- Longest span: 17.1 m
- No. of spans: 3

Location
- Interactive map of Ponte di Quintodecimo

The Ponte di Quintodecimo is a Roman stone bridge over the river Tronto next to the village of Quintodecimo, Marche, central Italy.

The bridge consists of a main arch spanning the river and 2 smaller arches connecting the road to the bridge. The main arch has a span of ca 17 m. The width of the bridge is about 3.8 m. The original construction material was Travertine. During Roman times the bridge was a part of the Via Salaria, which led from Rome to the Adriatic coast.

== See also ==
- List of Roman bridges
- Roman architecture
- Roman engineering

== Sources ==
- O’Connor, Colin (1993), Roman Bridges, Cambridge University Press, p. 85, ISBN 0-521-39326-4
- Cortright, Robert S. (1998), Bridging: Discovering the Beauty of Bridges, Bridge Ink, p. 111, ISBN 0-9641963-2-8
