= Santa Teresa del Bambin Gesù in Panfilo =

Church building in Rome, Italy

Coordinates: 41°55′07″N 12°29′37″E

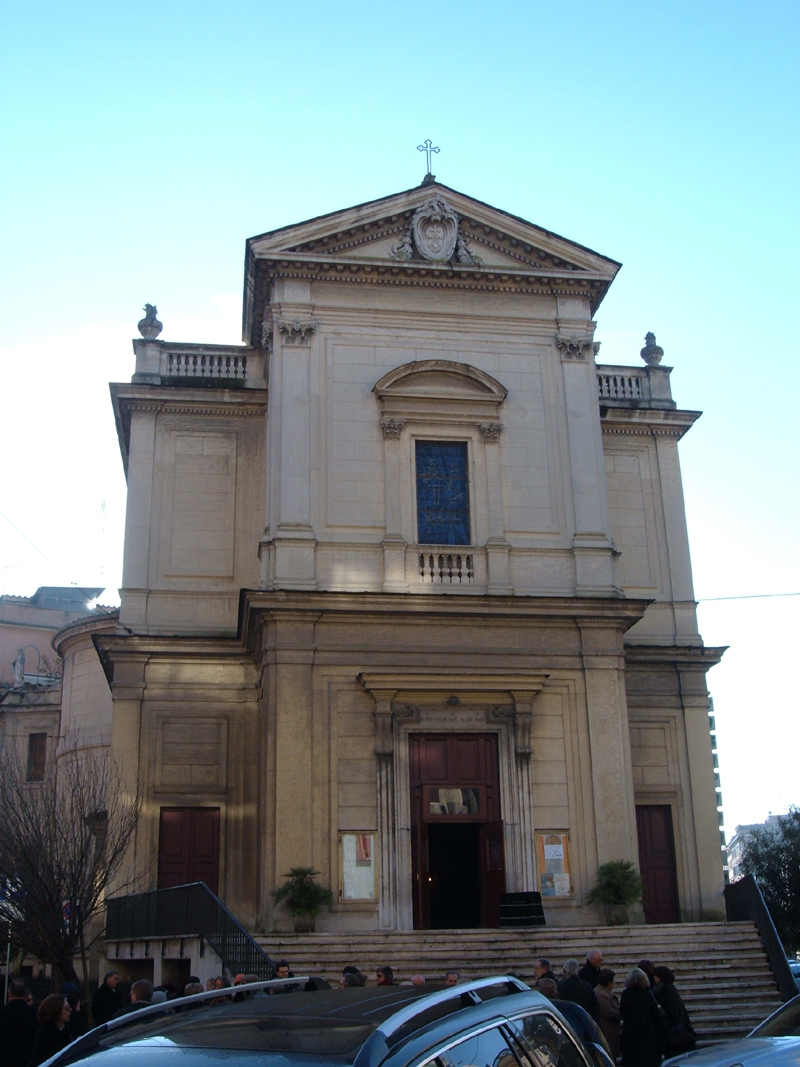
West end.

Santa Teresa del Bambin Gesù in Panfilo is a church in the Pinciano quarter of Rome, at the junction of via Giovanni Paisiello and via Gaspare Spontini. It is dedicated to Teresa of Lisieux and since its inception has been run by the Discalced Carmelites, whose monastery next door was completed in 1929.

The epithet in Panfilo derives from the catacomb of San Panfilo on which it was built to designs by Guglielmo Palombi between 1929 and 1932, though its crypt was opened on 16 May 1928. It was consecrated on 2 October 1932 by monsignor Adeodato Giovanni Piazza. It was made a parish church from 6 December 1952 to 30 September 2011 as a result of Omnium ecclesiarum, a decree by the Cardinal Vicar Clemente Micara.

== Description ==
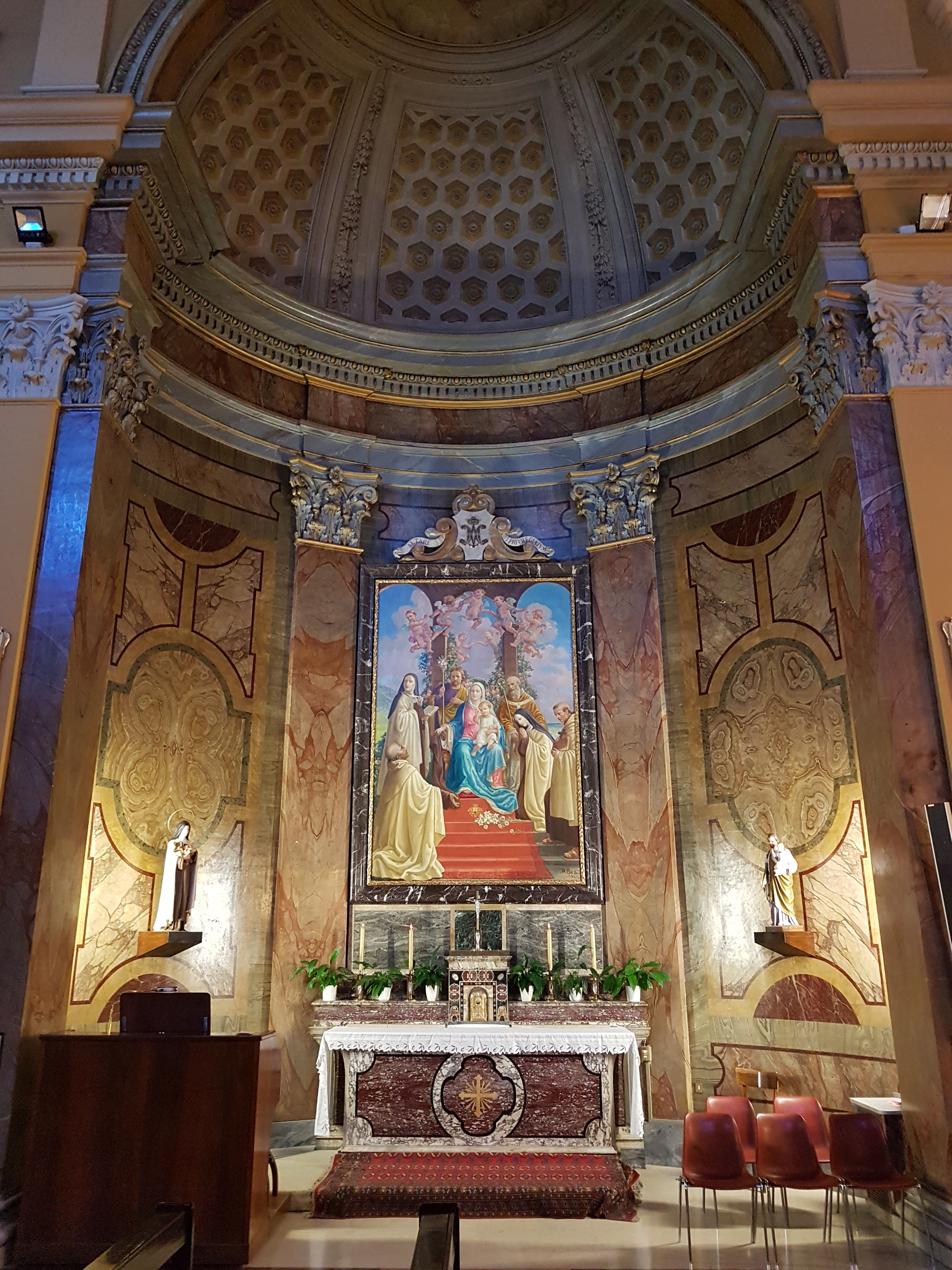
Altar to Madonna del Carmine

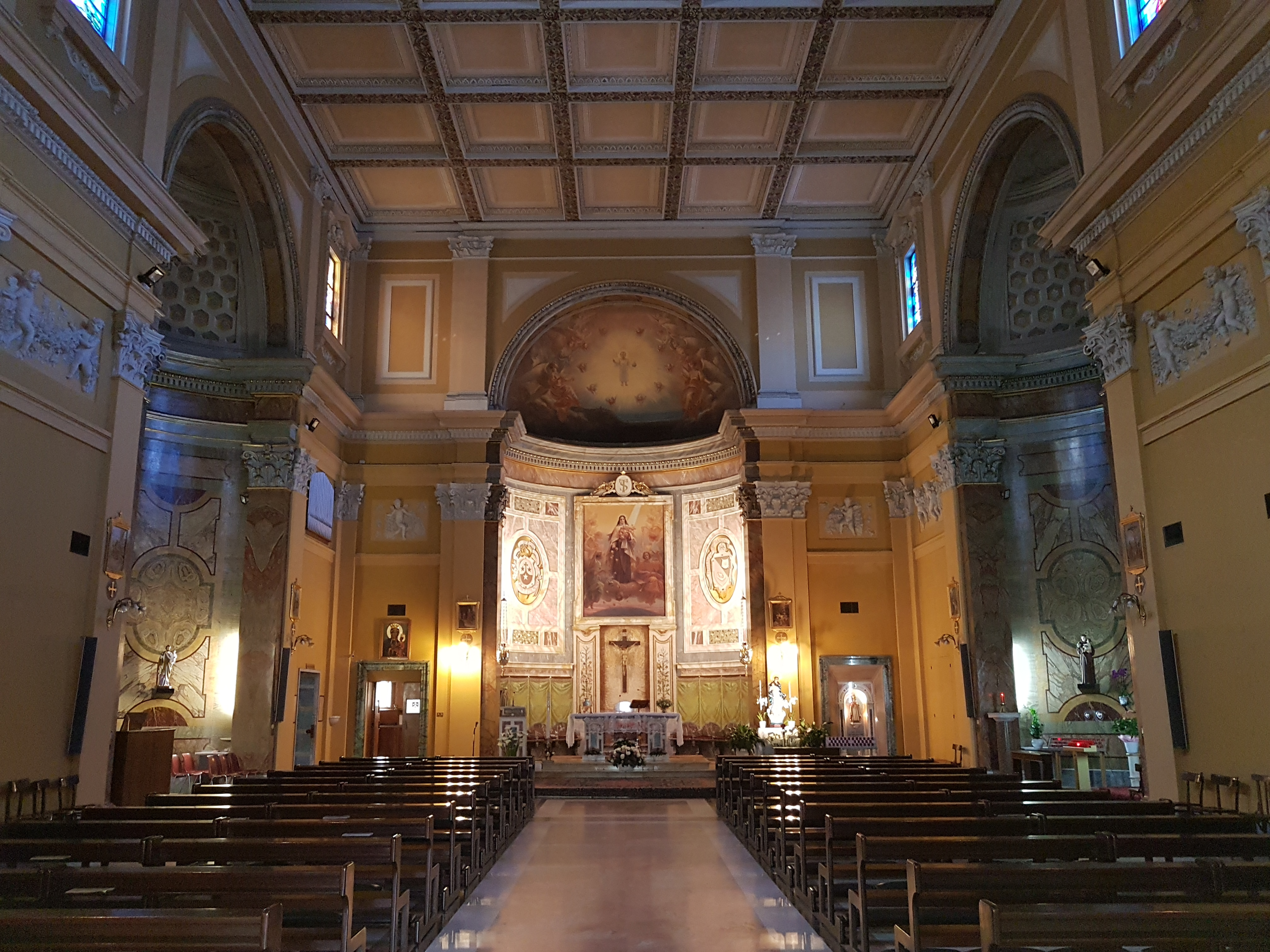
Chancel.

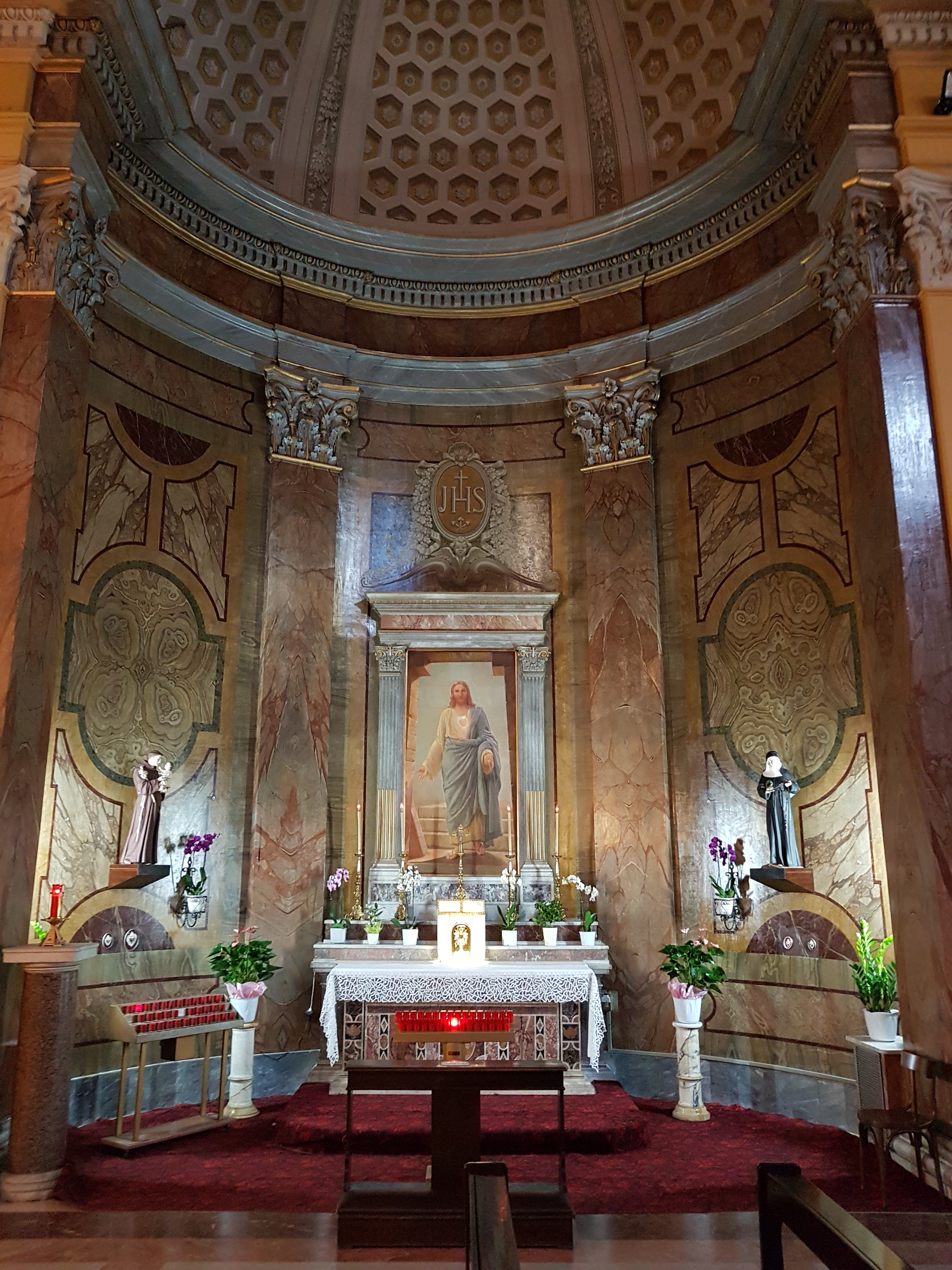
Altar of Sacro Cuore di Gesù

== Bibliography (in Italian) ==
- C. Rendina, Le Chiese di Roma, Newton & Compton Editori, Milano 2000, 358
- A. Manodori, Quartiere III. Pinciano, in AA.VV, I quartieri di Roma, Newton & Compton Editori, Roma 2006
- G. Fronzuto, Organi di Roma. Guida pratica orientativa agli organi storici e moderni, Leo S. Olschki Editore, Firenze 2007, pp. 408–409. ISBN 978-88-222-5674-4
