= Paulina of Thuringia =

Paulina of Thuringia or Pauline von Arnstadt (died 13 March 1107) was a pious and wealthy noblewoman of the Holy Roman Empire who founded the double monastery of Paulinzella. She is recognized as a saint in the Roman Martyrology of the Catholic Church. Her feast day is March 14.

End of the preface and start of the main text (indicated by a rubric in red) of Sigeboto's biography of Paulina, whose name appears in red at the top of the page, in a 15th-century manuscript

Paulina was born around 1050 in Calw to a nobleman named Moricho, who himself became a lay brother of Hirsau Abbey. She was twice married and twice widowed. After the death of her second husband, Ulrich von Scharplan, she retired to establish a hermitage in the forest which became Paulinzella. Her daughter and her son Werner joined her.

Paulina became famous for her needlework. She "had no superior and scarcely any equal in the province of Thuringia where she lived, in the making of gold borders and stoles." Her nuns, too, practised needlework and weaving to support the foundation.

Paulina went on a pilgrimage to Santiago de Compostela and also to Rome. During the latter trip she received the approval of the pope for Paulinzella. On her return journey, she fell from her horse and broke her arm. It never fully healed and she died at Münsterschwarzach Abbey while on her way to Hirsau to escort her monks to their newly built cloisters. She was immediately hailed as a saint by the people. She was interred in her basilica at Paulinzella in 1122. The main source for her life is her Latin biography, Vita Paulinae, written by her confessor, Sigeboto, around 1150.

== Sources ==
- Dodwell, C. R. (1993). The Pictorial Arts of the West, 800–1200. Yale University Press.
- Holböck, Ferdinand (2017). Married Saints and Blesseds Through the Centuries. Ignatius Press.
- Schulenburg, Jane Tibbetts (2009). "Holy Women and the Needle Arts: Piety, Devotion, and Stitching the Sacred, ca. 500–1150". In Katherine Smith; Scott Wells (eds.). Negotiating Community and Difference in Medieval Europe: Gender, Power, Patronage and the Authority of Religion in Latin Christendom. Brill. pp. 83–110.
- Watkins, Basil (2016). The Book of Saints: A Comprehensive Biographical Dictionary (8th ed.). Bloomsbury.
