= Catacombs of San Valentino =

Ancient Roman site

Coordinates: 41.924941°N 12.473122°E

The Catacombs of San Valentino (Italian: Catacombe di San Valentino) is one of the catacombs of Rome (Italy), placed at the 2nd mile of the via Flaminia, now in Viale Maresciallo Pilsudski, in the modern Pinciano neighborhood.

== History ==
Italian archaeologist Antonio Bosio was the first to enter the catacomb, into the upper level (no longer visible today). The first archaeologist to excavate the remains of the catacomb was Orazio Marucchi (1852–1931): in 1878, while searching for the cemetery, he casually entered a cellar, at the foot of the Parioli hills, and he realized that it actually was a grave covered with pictures, though very ruined because of its change into a room for agricultural use. Marucchi himself also discovered the remains of the outer basilica, dedicated to Saint Valentine. New archaeological investigations were carried out in 1949 by Bruno Maria Apollonj Ghetti.

These excavations permitted to ascertain that the martyr Valentine was not buried into the catacomb, but directly into a pit outside it; on this subdial grave, Pope Julius I (336–352) built a former basilical structure, which was modified and enlarged by popes Honorius I (625–638) and Theodore I (642–649) and further restored in the following centuries until the last works carried out by Pope Nicholas II in the mid-11th century. To this century dates back the testimony of a cloister close to the basilica. The basilica was still existing in the 13th century and some remains were visible in the time of Bosio (1594).

It has also been ascertained that, during the 6th century, between the basilica and the catacomb an open-air necropolis rose, with mausoleums, tombs and sarcophaguses.

Nowadays hardly anything remains of the catacomb, especially due to the flood and the landslip that involved the area in 1986 and that made most of the galleries inaccessible. The only significant artifacts are the outer basilica and the ambulatory discovered by Marucchi in 1878 and placed at the entrance of the catacomb.

== The martyr ==
A controversial debate arose between academics and archaeologists during the 20th century about the figure of Saint Valentine: in fact, the date of February, 14 is consecrated to two martyr saints with the same name, the priest Valentine from Rome and the bishop Valentine from Terni. The theories can be summed up as follows.

1. The first solution of the question of the two martyrs bearing the same name is the classic one, asserted by most of the academics until some decades ago: the saints are two different men. Valentine from Rome was a presbyter, who was martyred on February 14 under Emperor Gallienus (253–268) and was buried by a Christian woman named Sabinilla into a plot she owned at the feet of the Parioli hill. These topographic indications are confirmed by the Chronography of 354, written by Furius Dionysius Filocalus, which is the earliest notice about the martyr Valentine: in fact the Chronography tells that Pope Julius I built a basilica “quae appellatur Valentini” (which is called Valentine's). Moreover, the presence of a man named Valentine in Rome is also attested by the discovery, into the basilica at the feet of the Parioli, of some fragments of a carmen written by Pope Damasus I to celebrate the martyr.
2. In the 1960s, the Franciscan scholar Agostino Amore, taking his stand on the notice into the Chronography, supposed that a martyr Valentine from Rome never existed. According to his investigation, Valentine is the name of the man who financed the building of the outer basilica under the papacy of Pope Julius I in the mid-4th century and who, due to this donation, deserved the epithet of saint during the 6th century: in order to confirm his thesis, Amore quotes documents from a Roman synod in 595, in which each titular church of Rome is preceded by the word “saint”, while in a similar document from a synod in 499 the expression sanctus before the name of the Roman titular churches never appears. Finally, for Valentine it seems plausible the same situation of other ancient Roman tituli, like the ones of Saint Cecilia, Saint Praxedes or Saint Pudentiana.
3. In the last decades, the scholar Vincenzo Fiocchi Nicolai has proposed a new interpretation, according to which the priest Valentine from Rome and the bishop Valentine from Terni would be the same person. Fiocchi Nicolai suggests the existence of a single Valentine, a priest from Terni who came to Rome and here was martyred and buried: later his worship spread until it reached his native town, where it found a new urge “under more prestigious pretences”. There would have been a sort of decoupling of the figure of the martyr, that was made more important by his fellow citizens through the assignment of the title of episcopus.

== Description ==
The former basilica of Saint Valentine has three naves. Two apses, pertaining to different phases of the building, have been brought to light. There are also remains of an underlying crypt – probably due to the works carried out by Pope Leo III (8th–9th century) – covered in marbles, some fragments of which are still in loco.

The only significant room of the catacomb, and also the only that can be visited today, is the ambulatory discovered by Marucchi in the 19th century and converted into a cellar. This room was visited by Antonio Bosio and at that time it was still intact: therefore, thanks to the drawings that he commissioned, it is possible to decipher the remains of the frescoes still surviving. According to their make and kind, they can be dated between the 7th century and the beginning of the 8th century. Especially notable is a series of frescoes about episodes of the life of Mary, taken from the New Testament apocrypha, and the fresco of a Crucifix, a very uncommon example into a catacomb.
