= Porta Pinciana =

Gate of the Aurelian walls, a landmark of Rome, Italy

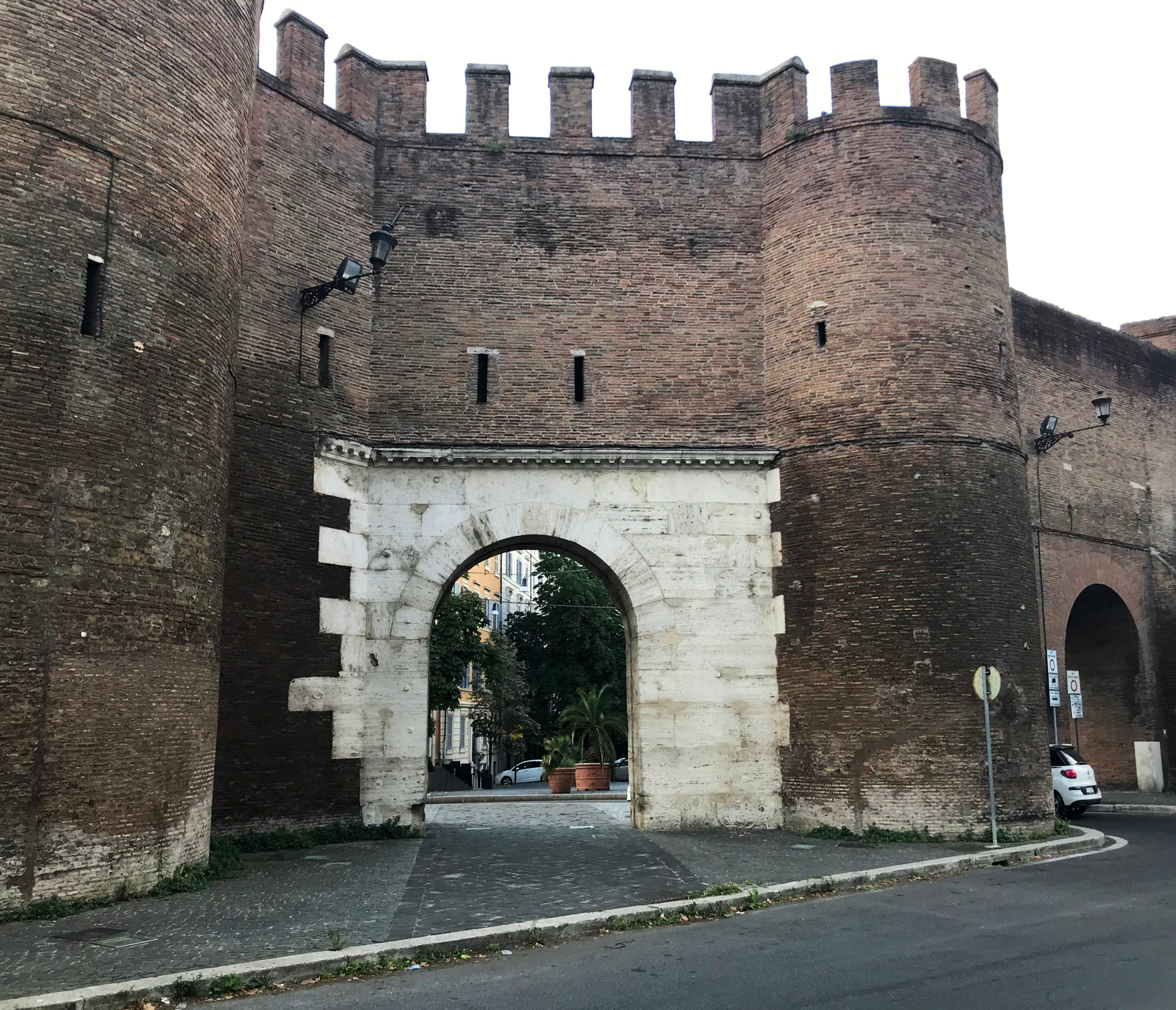
- External view of Porta Pinciana

- Location within Rome
- Interactive map of Porta Pinciana
- 41°54′34″N 12°29′18″E
- Location: Rome

Porta Pinciana is a gate of the Aurelian Walls in Rome.

The name derives from the gens Pincia, who owned the eponymous hill (Pincian Hill). In ancient times it was also called Porta Turata ("Plugged Gate", for it was partially closed) and Porta Salaria vetus, as the oldest Via Salaria passed under it (the Via Salaria nova passed under the Porta Salaria).

The gate was built under the emperor Honorius in the early 5th century.

During the Middle Ages a legend told that the Byzantine general Belisarius, who here had defended Rome against the Ostrogoths in the siege of 537–538, was refused admission by the Romans.

The two side passages are a modern addition. The gate remained closed until the early 20th century.

== See also ==
- Porta del Popolo – Gate of the Aurelian walls, a landmark of Rome, Italy
- List of ancient monuments in Rome

== Notes ==
Preceded by Porta Pia	Landmarks of Rome; Porta Pinciana	Succeeded by Porta del Popolo
