= Antonio Bosio =

Maltese-Italian historian

Antonio Bosio (c. 1575 or 1576 – 1629) was a Maltese scholar, the first systematic explorer of subterranean Rome (the "Columbus of the Catacombs"), author of Roma Sotterranea and first urban spelunker.

== Life ==
Bosio was born in Malta, and was sent as a boy to the care of his uncle, who was a representative at the Holy See of the Knights of Malta. He studied literature, philosophy, and jurisprudence, but at the age of eighteen he gave up his legal studies, went to Rome and for the remainder of his lifetime was devoted to archaeological work in the Roman catacombs. He died in Rome in 1629.

== Work ==
The accidental discovery in 1578 of an ancient subterranean cemetery on the Via Salaria had attracted general attention in Rome. Few, however, realized the importance of the discovery, and with the exception of three foreign scholars, Alfonso Chacon, the antiquarian Philips van Winghe (1560–1592) from Leuven and Jean L'Heureux (alias Macarius), no one seriously thought of pursuing further investigations. Bosio began the systematic exploration of subterranean Rome and thus became a precursor of the science of Christian archaeology, an inspiration to Giovanni Battista de Rossi. The young explorer realized that early Christian literature such as acta of the martyrs and accounts of the councils would offer clues to the locations of the catacombs; an idea of the vast scope of his reading is in two great folio volumes of his manuscript notes in the Vallicelliana library at Rome, each of which contains about a thousand pages.

The scholarly labors of Bosio accounted for only half of his time; after he had collected all the data possible relative to the location of a catacomb on one of the great Roman roads leading from Rome, Bosio would set out for the places indicated, and cover the ground carefully in the hope of discovering a forgotten stairway offering access, or a luminarium lighting the underground galleries of a cemetery. He had the sense to question the local peasants. He would then descend to the subterranean galleries and commence his explorations. Narrow passages led from one series of galleries to another. Years could pass without any new entrances being discovered.

== Publication ==
This life work of Bosio was all but unknown until the publication three years after his death of his Roma Sotterranea, opera postuma di Antonio Bosio Romano, antiquario ecclesiastico singolare de' suoi tempi. Compita, disposta, et accresciuta dal M. R. P. Giovanni Severani da S. Severino (Rome, 1632), usually referred to as Roma Sotterranea. The folio volume was brought out under the patronage of the Knights of Malta, edited by the Oratorian Giovanni Severano, under the patronage of Cardinal Francesco Barberini. A Latin translation that appeared in 1651 took liberties with the text. Bosio's Roma Sotterranea is entirely devoted to a description of the cemeteries with the end of ascertaining all that was possible regarding the history of each cemetery, by what name it was known in antiquity, who its founders were, and what martyrs and illustrious Christians were interred there. Many of his conclusions have in modern times been found to be erroneous, but Bosio's method is acknowledged to have been scientific within the shortcomings of the infant science of archaeology. The engravings that accompanied the volume are of little use to the modern archaeologist.

An unfortunate result of the publication was that with the locations known, the catacombs were scoured for anything that might prove of value on the market; though much information on the condition of the catacombs and their inscriptions and frescoes in the early 17th century was preserved in Bosio's volume, much also was lost. Some of the catacombs Bosio described have since been destroyed by subsequent construction.

This book must have been rated highly by the English physician and philosopher Sir Thomas Browne, for copies in both Italian and Latin can be found in his library.

== References and further reading ==
- Herbermann, Charles, ed. (1913). "Antonio Bosio" . Catholic Encyclopedia. New York: Robert Appleton Company.
- "Accidental Discovery of Catacombs", by the Christian History Institute
- C. Cecalupo, Antonio Bosio, la Roma sotterranea e i primi collezionisti di antichità cristiane. Vatican City: Pontificio Istituto di Archeologia Cristiana, 2020
