= Via Salaria =

Ancient Roman road in Italy

Coordinates: 41.900°N 12.483°E

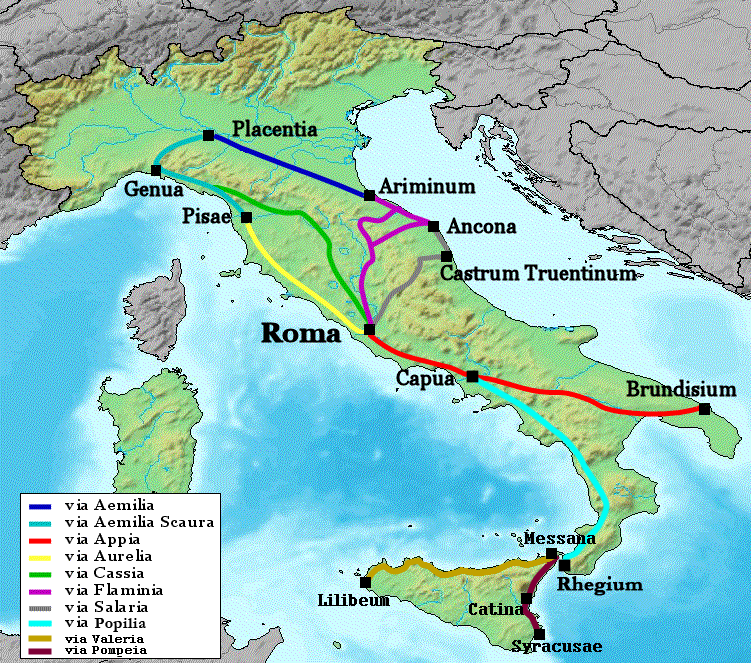
Route of Via Salaria (in gray)

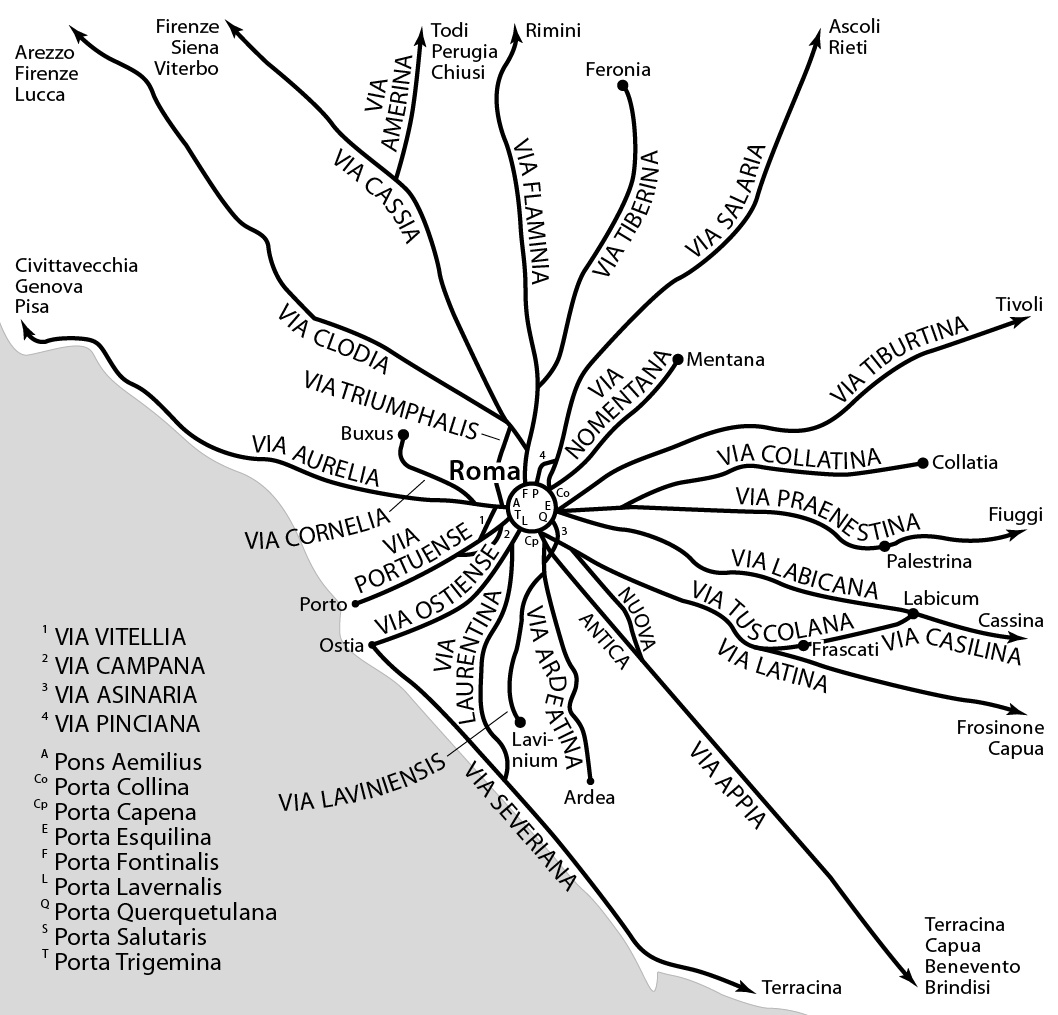
Roman roads around Rome

The Via Salaria was an ancient Roman road in Italy. It eventually ran from Rome (from Porta Salaria of the Aurelian Walls) to Castrum Truentinum (Porto d'Ascoli) on the Adriatic coast, a distance of 242 km. The road also passed through Reate (Rieti) and Asculum (Ascoli Piceno).

Strada statale 4 Via Salaria (SS4) is the modern state highway that maintains the old road's name and runs on the same path from Rome to the Adriatic Sea.

== History ==
The Via Salaria owes its name to the Latin word for "salt", since it was the route by which the Sabines living nearer the Tyrrhenian Sea came to fetch salt from the marshes at the mouth of the river Tiber, the Campus Salinarum (near Portus). Peoples nearer the Adriatic Sea used it to fetch it from production sites there. It was one of many ancient salt roads in Europe, and some historians, amongst whom Francesco Palmegiani, consider the Salaria and the trade in salt to have been the origin of the settlement of Rome. Some remains still exist of the mountain sections of the road.

== Roman bridges ==
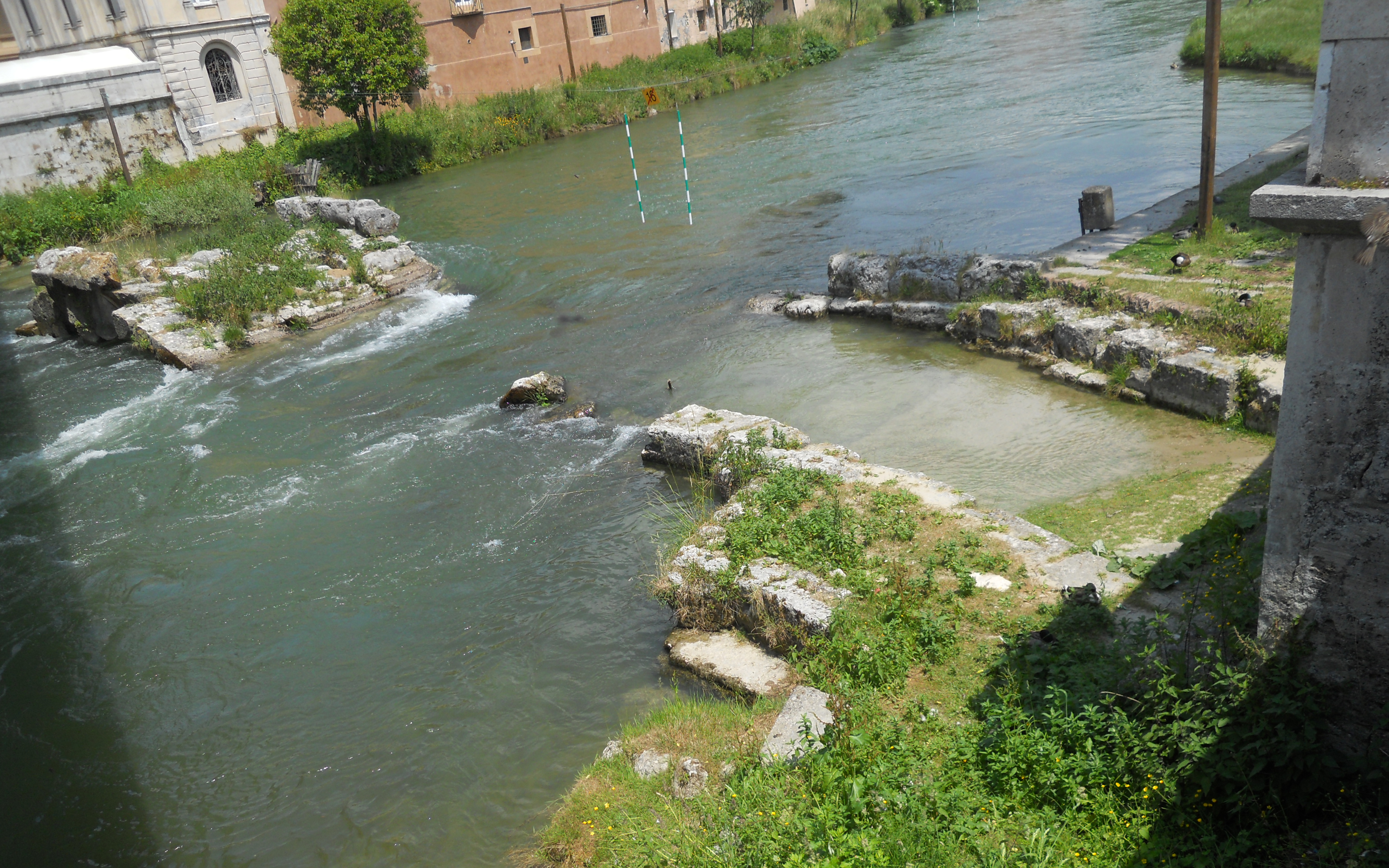
Remains of the Roman bridge over Velino river in Rieti

There are the remains of several Roman bridges along the road, including the Ponte del Gran Caso, Ponte della Scutella, Ponte d'Arli, Ponte di Quintodecimo, Ponte Romano (Acquasanta), Ponte Salario and Ponte Sambuco.

== See also ==
- Roman bridge
- Roman engineering
- Catacombs:
  - Priscilla
  - ad Clivum Cucumeris
  - Sant'Ermete
  - Via Anapo
