= Monte San Valentino (Rome) =

Hill in Rome, Italy

Highest point
- Elevation: 98 m (322 ft)
- Coordinates: 41°55′30″N 12°27′6″E

Geography
- Location: Rome (Italy)

Monte San Valentino, also improperly known as Monte Parioli, is a hill in Rome (Italy), on the right side of the Tiber, reaching 98 m above sea level; together with Monte Cacciarello, it forms the Monti Parioli. It is located in the north-west area of the town, within the Municipio II.

== Origin of the name ==
The hill is named after Saint Valentine, a bishop who died in Rome in the 3rd century.

== Civil settlements ==
The built-up area of the hill is mostly inhabited by upper-middle-class families.

== Parks ==
- Nature reserve of Monte Mario
