= Sara De Angelis =

Italian politician (born 1976)

Member of the Chamber of Deputies
- In office 23 March 2018 – 12 October 2022
- Constituency: Lazio 1 – P03

Personal details
- Born: 6 July 1976 (age 49)
- Party: Lega

Sara De Angelis (born 6 July 1976) is an Italian politician. From 2018 to 2022, she was a member of the Chamber of Deputies. From 2008 to 2013, she served as mayor of Municipio II of Rome.
