= Municipio II =

Coordinates: 41°53′35″N 12°28′58″E

Municipio II di Roma
- Municipio of Rome
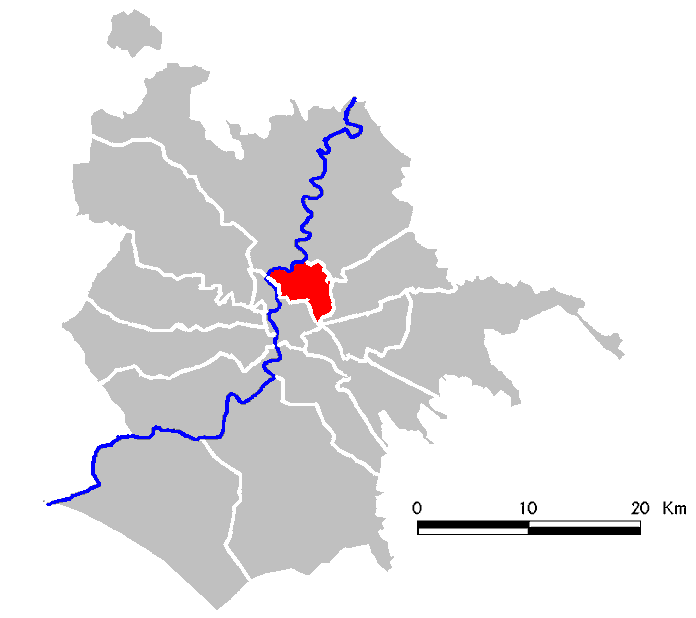
- Location of Municipio II of Rome
- Country: Italy
- Region: Lazio
- Comune: Rome
- Established: 19 January 2001; 11 March 2013 (resized)

Government
  - President: Francesca Del Bello (PD)

Area
  - Total: 7.59 sq mi (19.66 km^{2})

Population (2021)
  - Total: 166,007
  - Density: 22,085.9/sq mi (8,527.42/km^{2})
- Time zone: UTC+1 (CET)
  - Summer (DST): UTC+2 (CEST)
- Website: Municipio II of Rome

Municipio II is an administrative subdivision of the city of Rome, Italy.

Originally established by City Council of Rome on 19 January 2001, its borders were significantly expanded on 11 March 2013: following a citywide administrative reform, the neighboring Municipio III was abolished and its entire territory was merged into Municipio II.

== Subdivision ==
Municipio II is divided into 11 urban zones:

Urban zone	Population
2A. Villaggio Olimpico	2,796
2B. Parioli	21,567
2C. Flamninio	12,860
2D. Salario	25,116
2E. Trieste	52,076
2X. Villa Borghese	617
2Y. Villa Ada	849
3A. Nomentano	38,400
3B. San Lorenzo	8,761
3X. Università	944
3Y. Verano	231
Not localized	1,790
Total	166,007

== Municipal Government ==
The area has its own local authority called Consiglio di Municipio (Municipal Council), composed by a president and 25 members directly elected by citizens every five years. The council is responsible for most local services, such as schools, social services, waste collection, roads, parks, libraries and local commerce in the area, and manages funds (if any) provided by the city government for specific purposes, such as those intended to guarantee the right to education for poorer families.

The current president is Francesca Del Bello (PD). She was elected in the 2021 Rome municipal election together with the 25-member Municipal Council, whose composition is shown below:

Alliance or political party	Members	
Alliance or political party	2021–2027	
Centre-left (PD-SI)	16	16 / 25
Centre-right (FI-Lega-FdI)	4	4 / 25
Action (A)	4	4 / 25
Five Star Movement (M5S)	1	1 / 25

Here is a list of presidents of the Municipio II since 2001:

President	Party	Coalition	Term of office	
Antonio Saccone	FI	Centre-right	15 May 2001	30 May 2006
Guido Bottini	PD	Centre-left	30 May 2006	28 April 2008
Sara De Angelis	PdL	Centre-right	28 April 2008	12 June 2013
Giuseppe Gerace	PD	Centre-left	12 June 2013	19 June 2016
Francesca Del Bello	PD	Centre-left	19 June 2016	Incumbent

== Geography ==
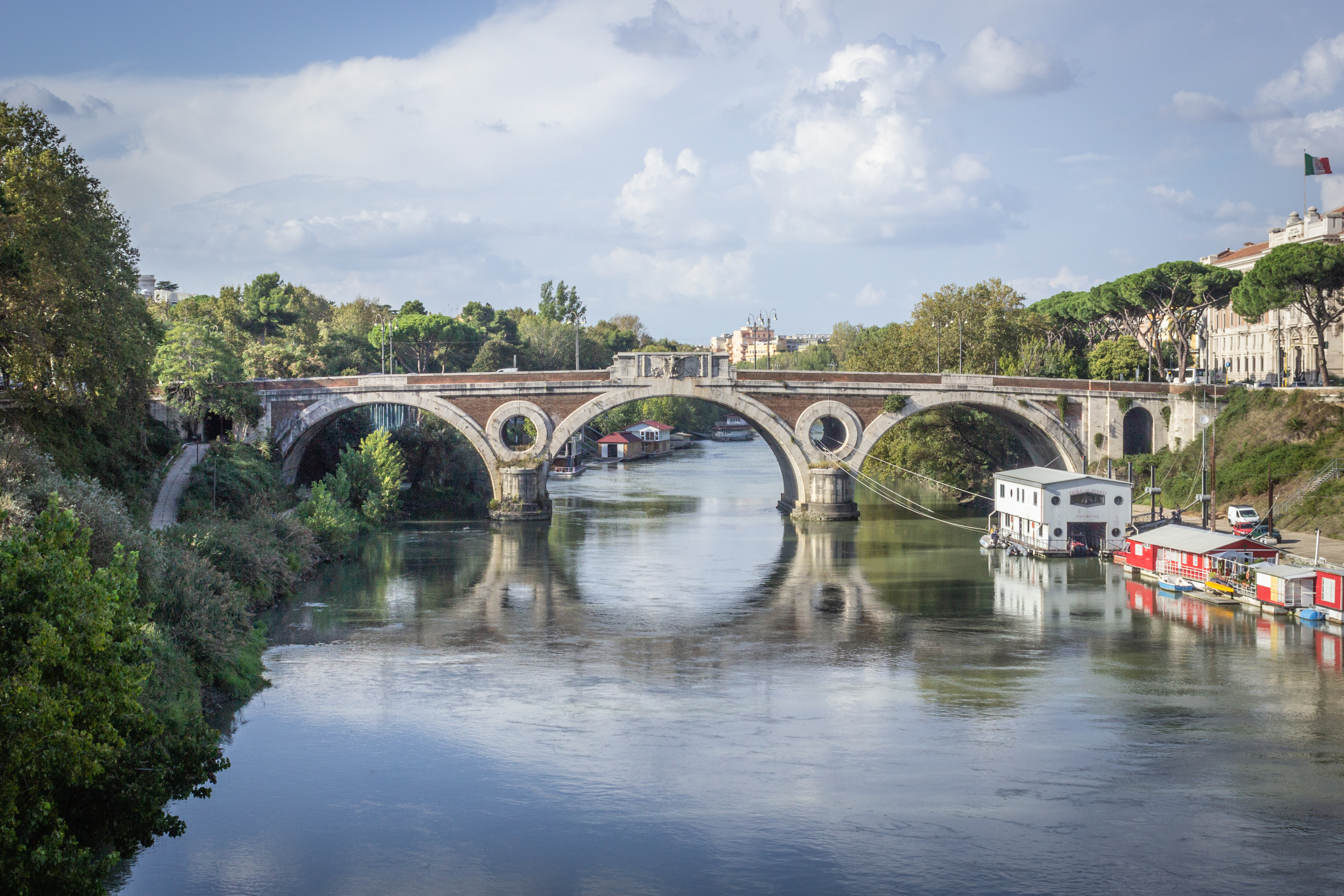
Matteotti Bridge over the Tiber.

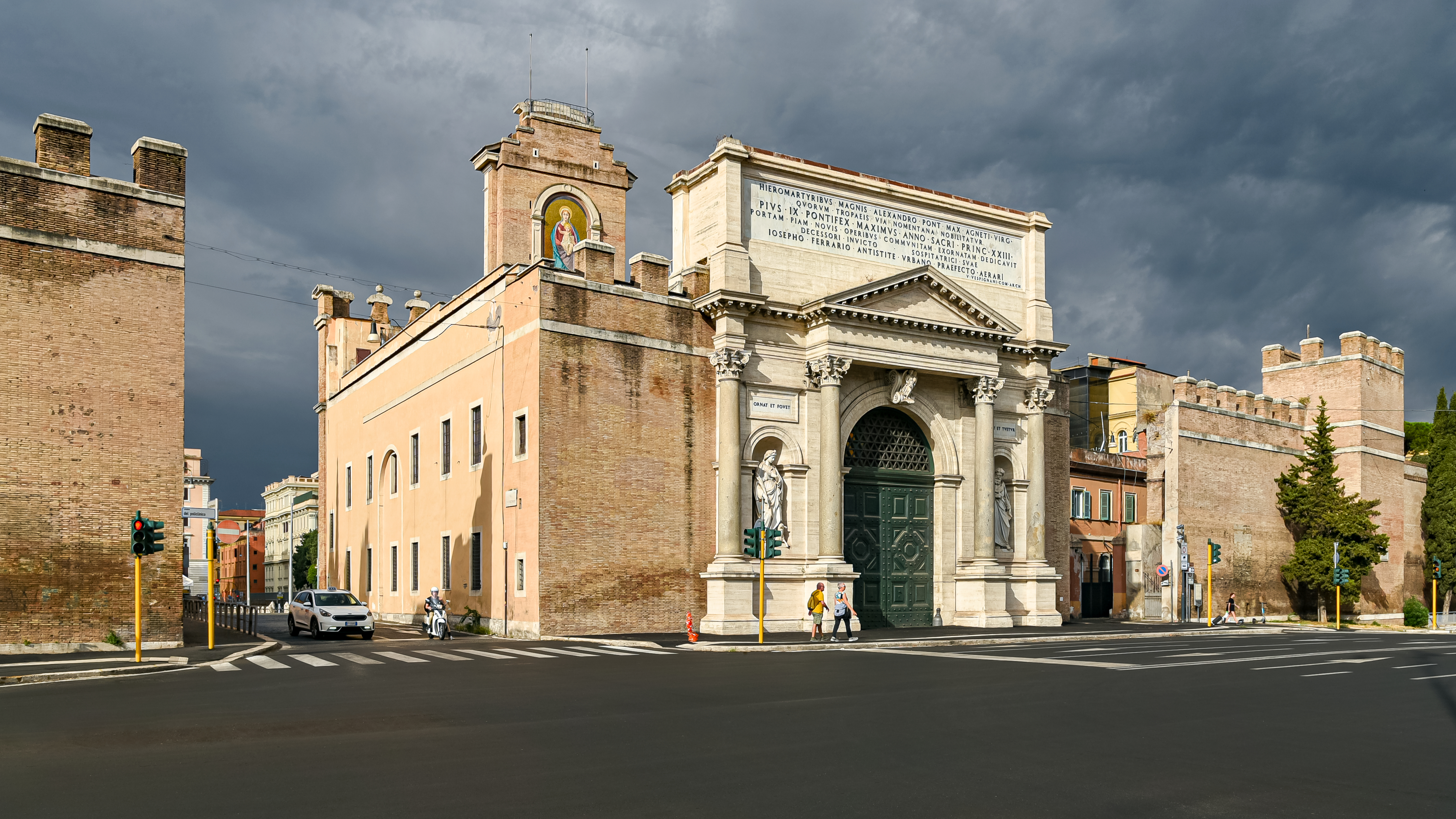
Porta Pia marks the southern border of Municipio II.

The geography of Municipio II is characterized by its strategic position immediately north-east of Rome's historic center, bounded by major river systems, ancient Roman roads, and historical defensive walls. Extending over an area of approximately 13.6 square kilometers, the territory serves as a crucial transitional zone between the ancient urban core and the northern metropolitan outskirts.

=== Territorial Boundaries ===
The perimeter of Municipio II is defined by a mix of natural and man-made landmarks that isolate it from neighboring administrative divisions. To the west, the Tiber forms a prominent natural boundary with Municipio I and Municipio XV, stretching along the Flaminio and Parioli districts down to the river's confluence with the Aniene. Moving clockwise toward the north, the Aniene river itself serves as the natural border separating the area from Municipio III, curving directly around the ancient archaeological and defensive site of Monte Antenne. The eastern flank is strictly artificial, bounded by the Florence–Rome railway line, the Tiburtina railway station loop, and the historic path of the Via Tiburtina, which together divide the territory from Municipio IV. Finally, the southern limit tracks along the edge of the Scalo San Lorenzo rail yard, running flush against the ancient Aurelian Walls (Mura Aureliane), past Porta Pia, and tracing the deep depression of the Viale del Muro Torto under the Pincio terrace back to the banks of the Tiber.

=== Urban Morphology and Districts ===
The urban landscape of Municipio II reflects different historical phases of Rome's post-unification expansion, displaying a stark morphological transition from affluent residential grids to historical working-class sectors. The municipio formally encompasses 14 official urban quarters. The western and central sectors are dominated by the districts of Flaminio, Parioli, Pinciano, Salario, and Trieste. Flaminio and Parioli are internationally recognized for modern cultural landmarks like the MAXXI and the Auditorium Parco della Musica, mixed with high-end residential avenues. Nearby, the Trieste and Salario districts feature early 20th-century architecture, highlighted by the eclectic, fairy-tale style palaces of the Coppedè district. Moving toward the east along the major historical axis of Via Nomentana, the landscape changes into the institutional and administrative hubs of the Nomentano and Italia neighborhoods. This contrasts sharply with the southeastern sector of San Lorenzo and Tiburtino; traditionally working-class and heavily impacted by World War II industrialization and aerial bombings, San Lorenzo has evolved into a vibrant student district driven by the presence of the Sapienza University of Rome.

=== Green spaces and historical villas ===
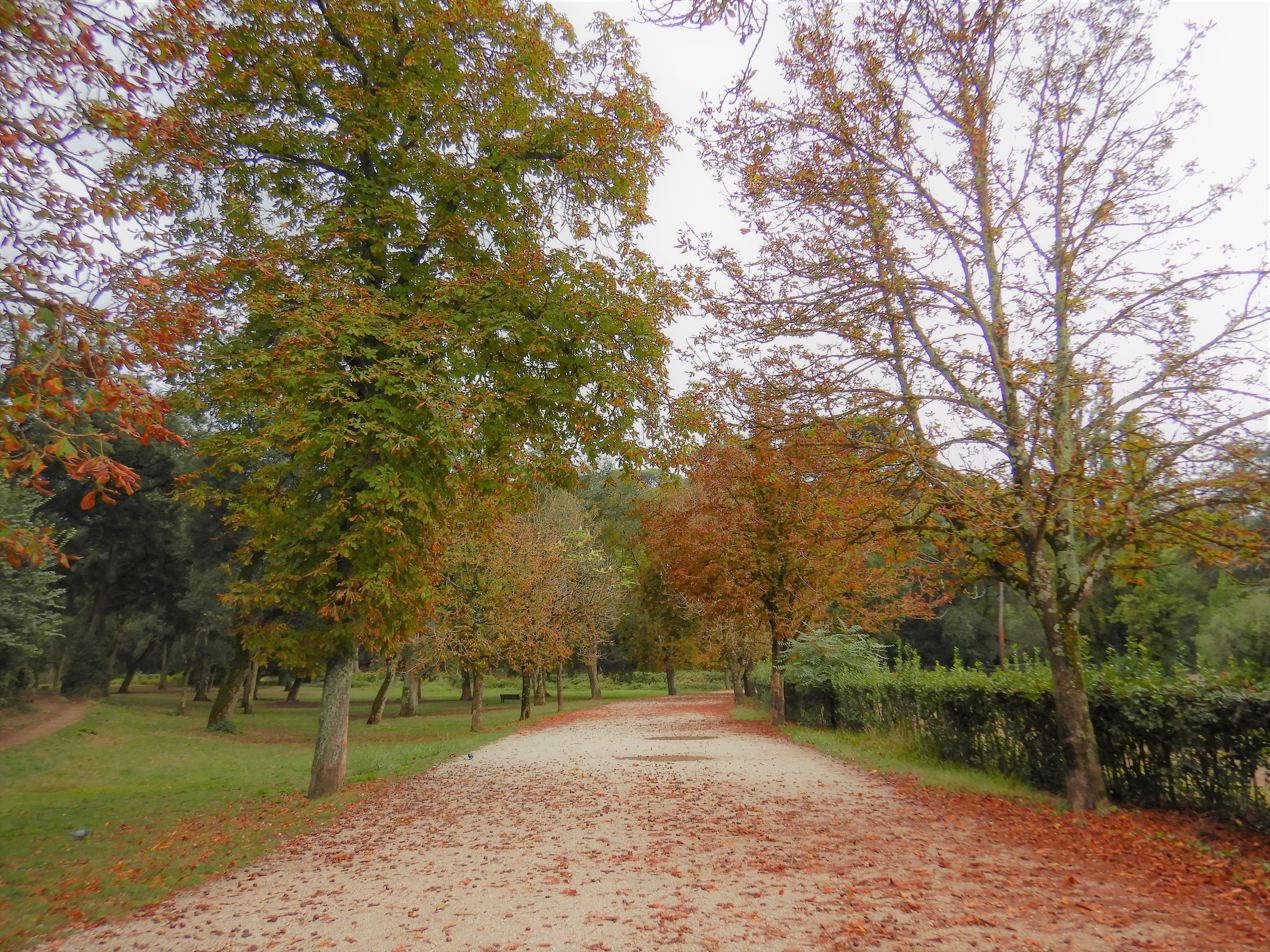
Park of Villa Ada.

Often referred to as the "Municipio delle Ville" (The Borough of Villas), the territory features an exceptionally high concentration of public parkland, making it one of the primary green lungs of the Italian capital. The underlying hydrography is deeply tied to the fluvial confluence of the Tiber and Aniene rivers, creating a low-lying valley network that was historically prone to marshy conditions but is now heavily urbanized and stabilized by high modern stone embankments. Spreading across the higher terrain are the massive historical estates of the Roman nobility. The southwest corner is anchored by Villa Borghese, which hosts the world-renowned Galleria Borghese and the Bioparco di Roma. Further north lies Villa Ada, a sprawling and densely wooded park that once served as the private royal residence of the House of Savoy. Finally, the neoclassical grounds of Villa Torlonia sit further inland, completing a continuous network of sub-mediterranean urban forests and historic architecture.

Famous villas in Municipio II are:

- Villa Ada – Located in the northern sector along the Via Salaria, this sprawling, densely wooded park is the second largest in the city. Originally an agricultural estate, it was transformed into a royal residence by the House of Savoy in the late 19th century. It features massive sub-mediterranean urban pine forests, romantic lakes, and the historic Villa Reale, and is now protected as a major environmental reserve.
- Villa Torlonia – Situated along the Via Nomentana, this neoclassical estate was purchased by the wealthy Torlonia banking family in 1797. The park is highly distinct for its architectural eclecticism, containing the alpine-style Casina delle Civette, the monumental Casino Nobile, and Egyptian-style obelisks. It gained modern historical prominence as the official rented residence of Benito Mussolini between 1925 and 1943.
- Villa Glori – Positioned on a rocky tufa bluff overlooking the Tiber in the Parioli district, this park is also known as the Parco della Rimembranza. It serves as a historical memorial dedicated to the Italian patriots who fell during the 1867 clash led by the Cairoli brothers, and features a rugged, pine-lined landscape integrated with contemporary open-air art installations.
- Villa Paganini – Located near Piazza Bologna in the Nomentano quarter, this smaller public garden was originally part of the Alberoni estate before being redesigned as a public park in the 1930s. It features a picturesque artificial lake, winding paths, and century-old trees, providing a quiet neighborhood refuge within a heavily urbanized residential grid.
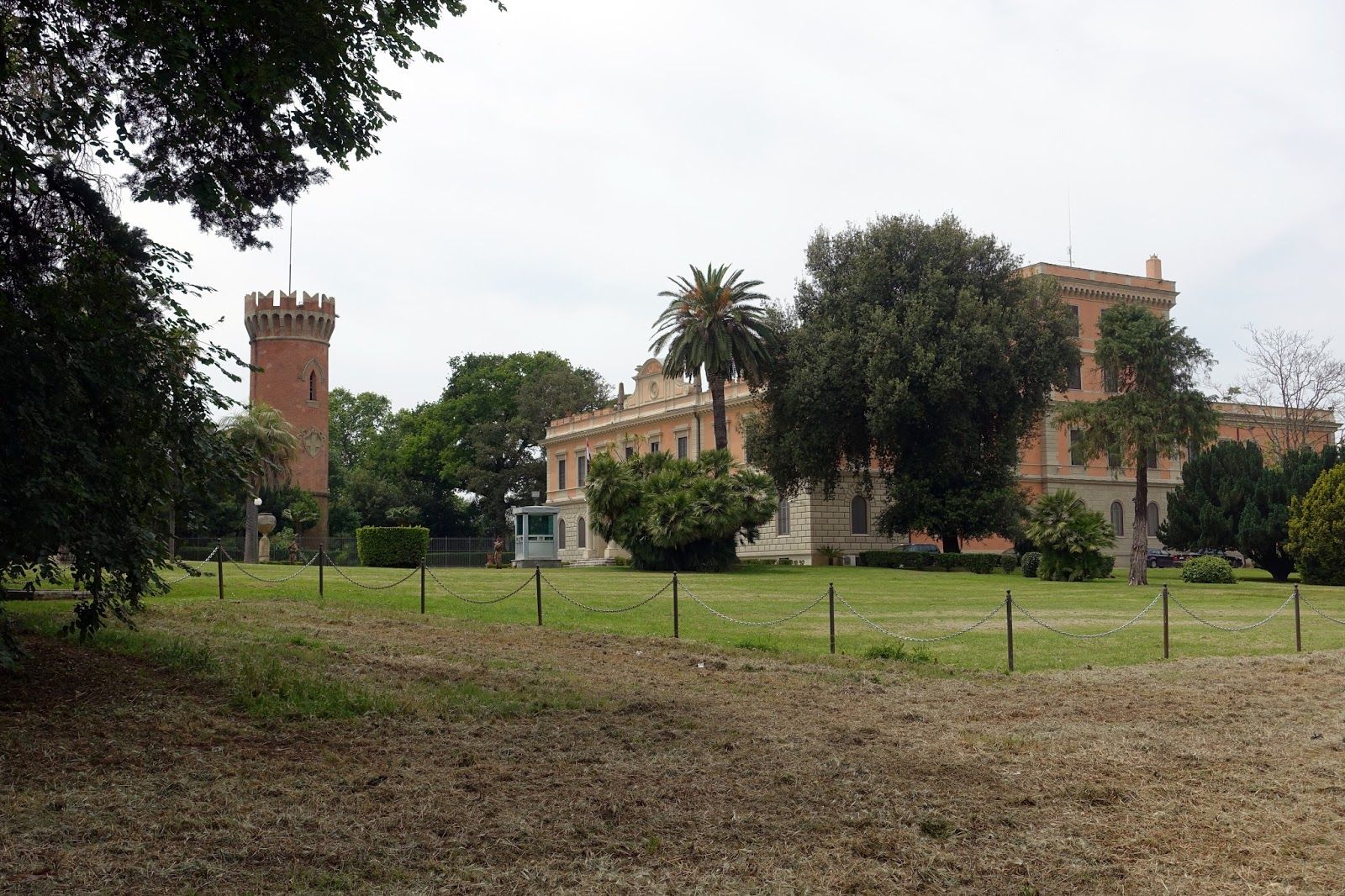
Villa Ada

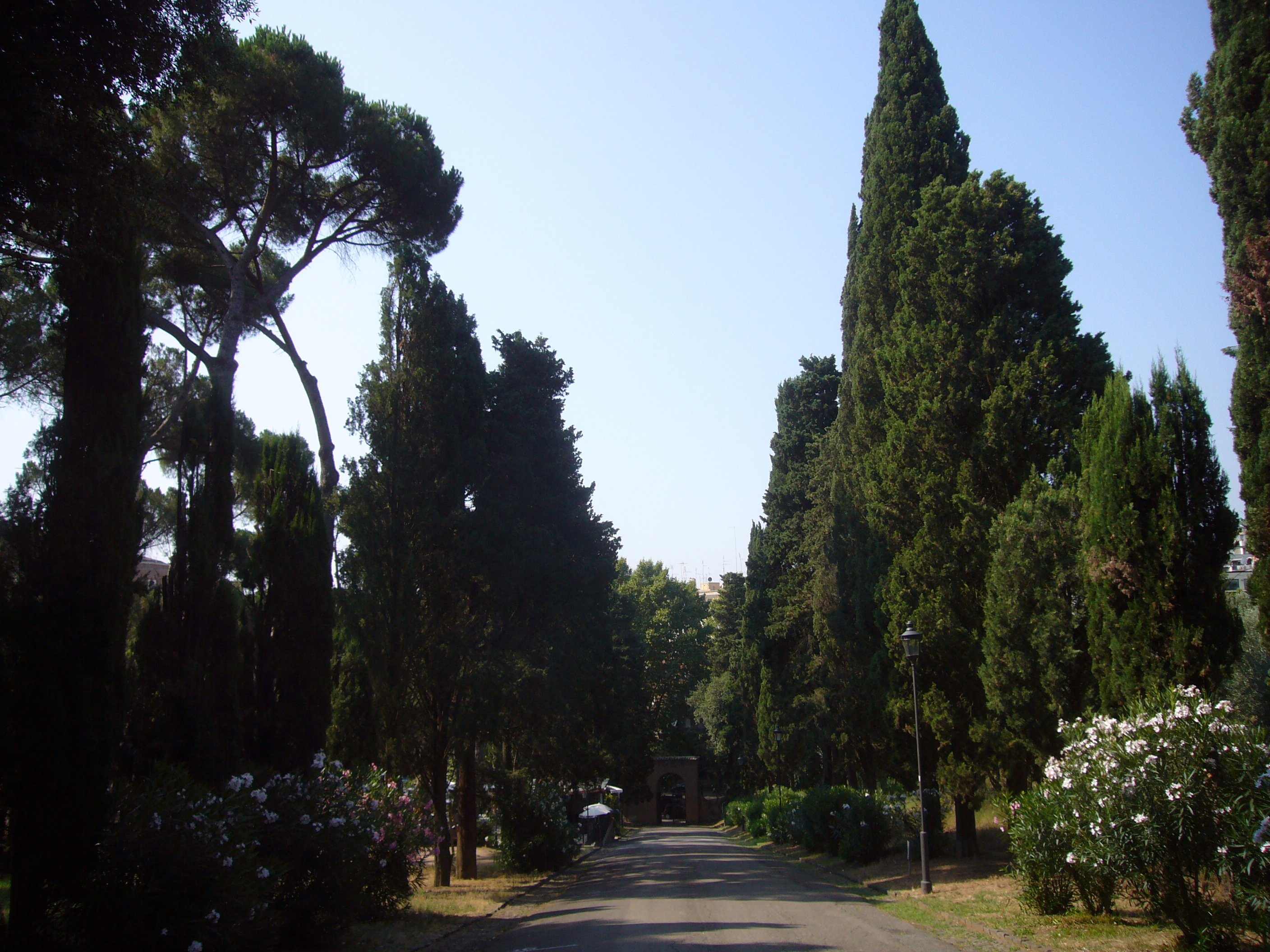
Villa Glori

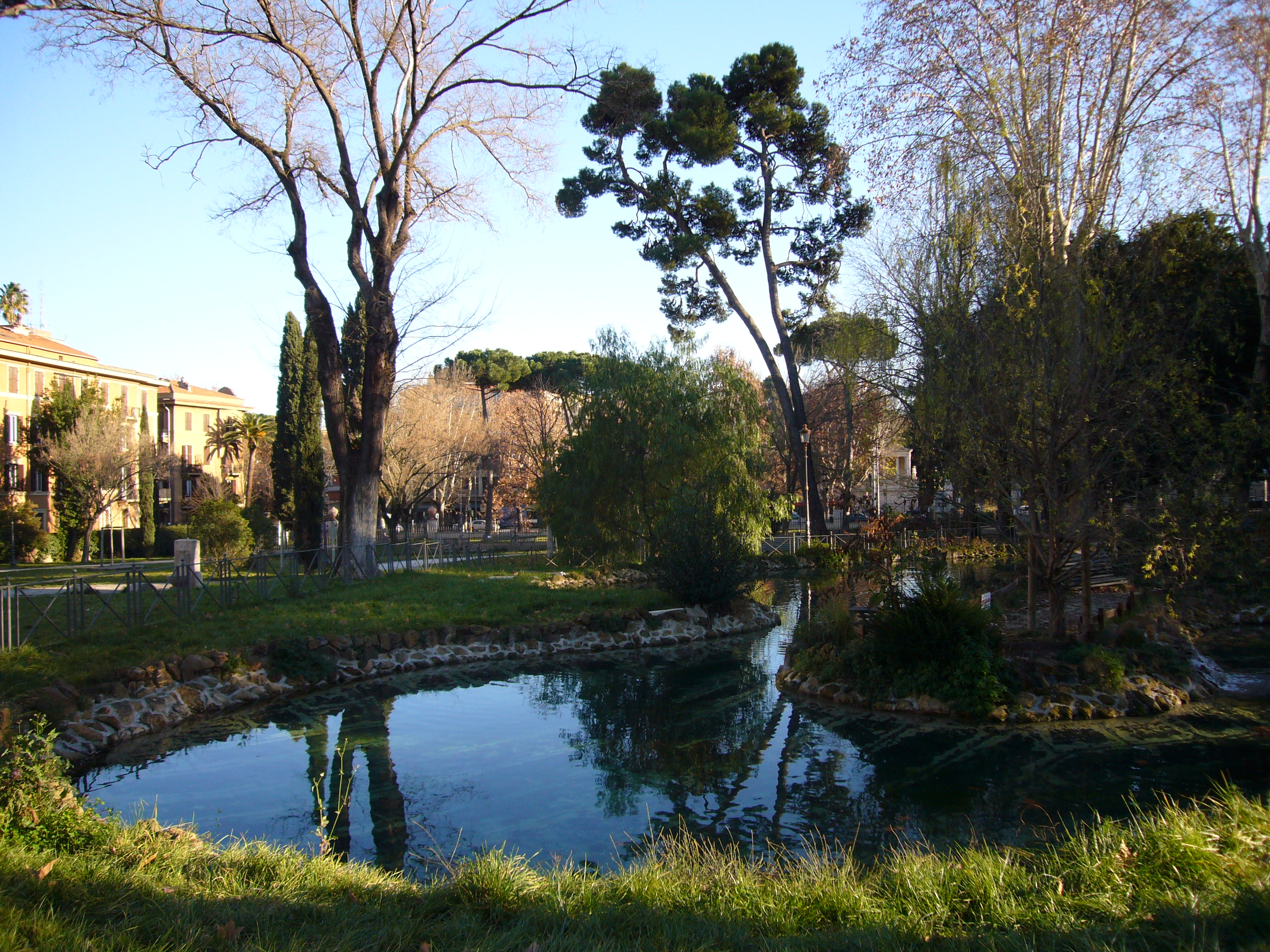
Villa Paganini

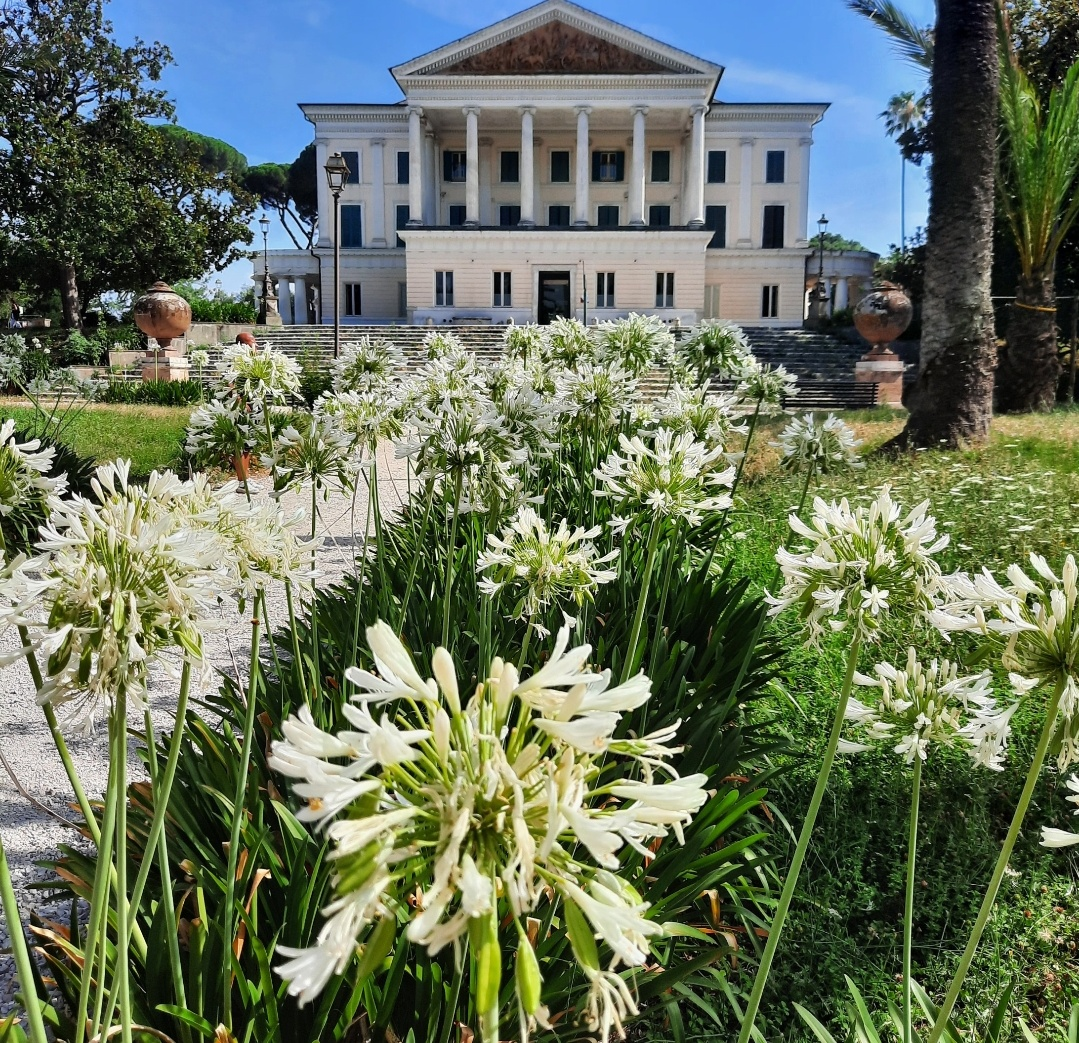
Villa Torlonia

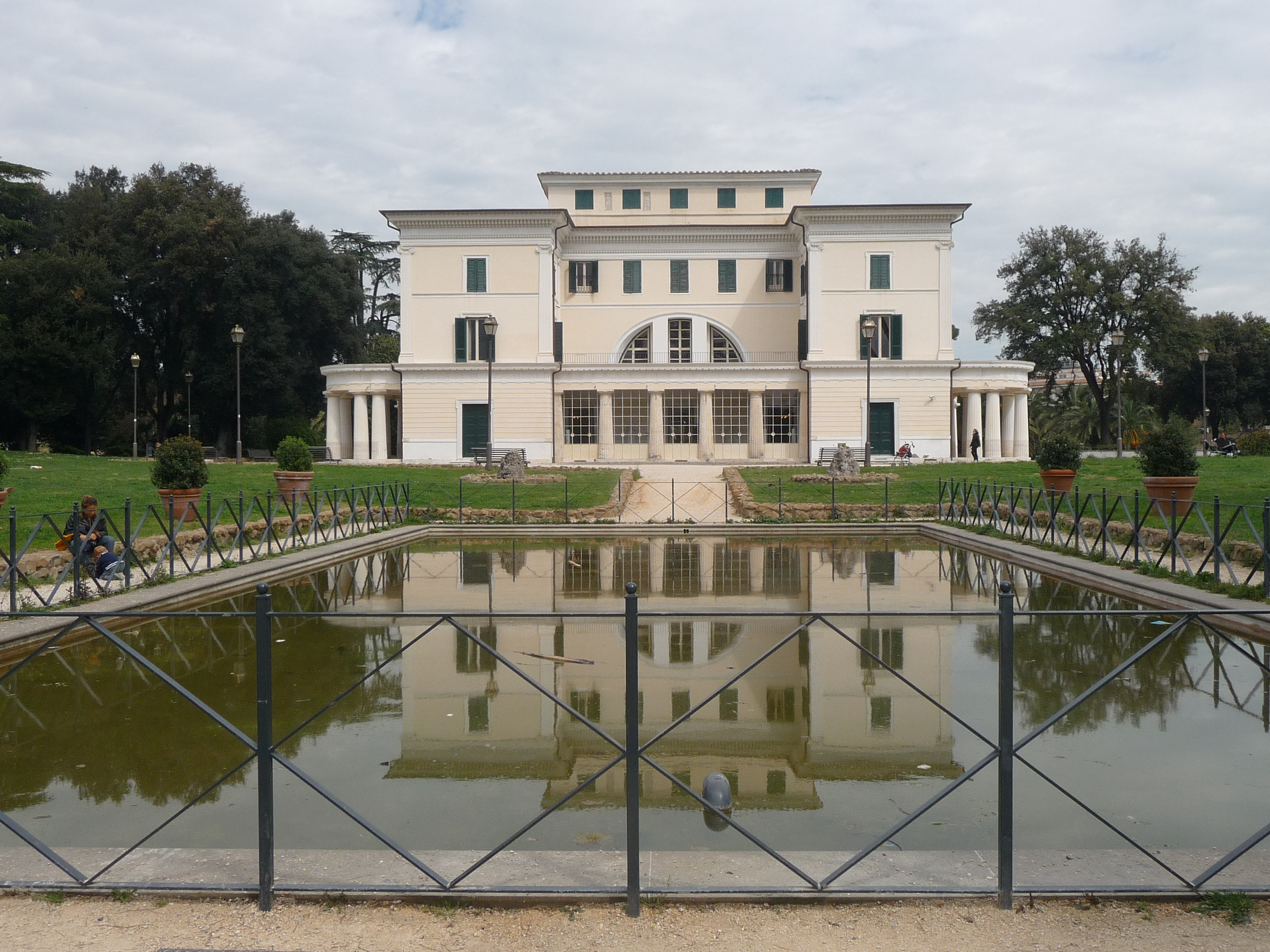
Villa Torlonia

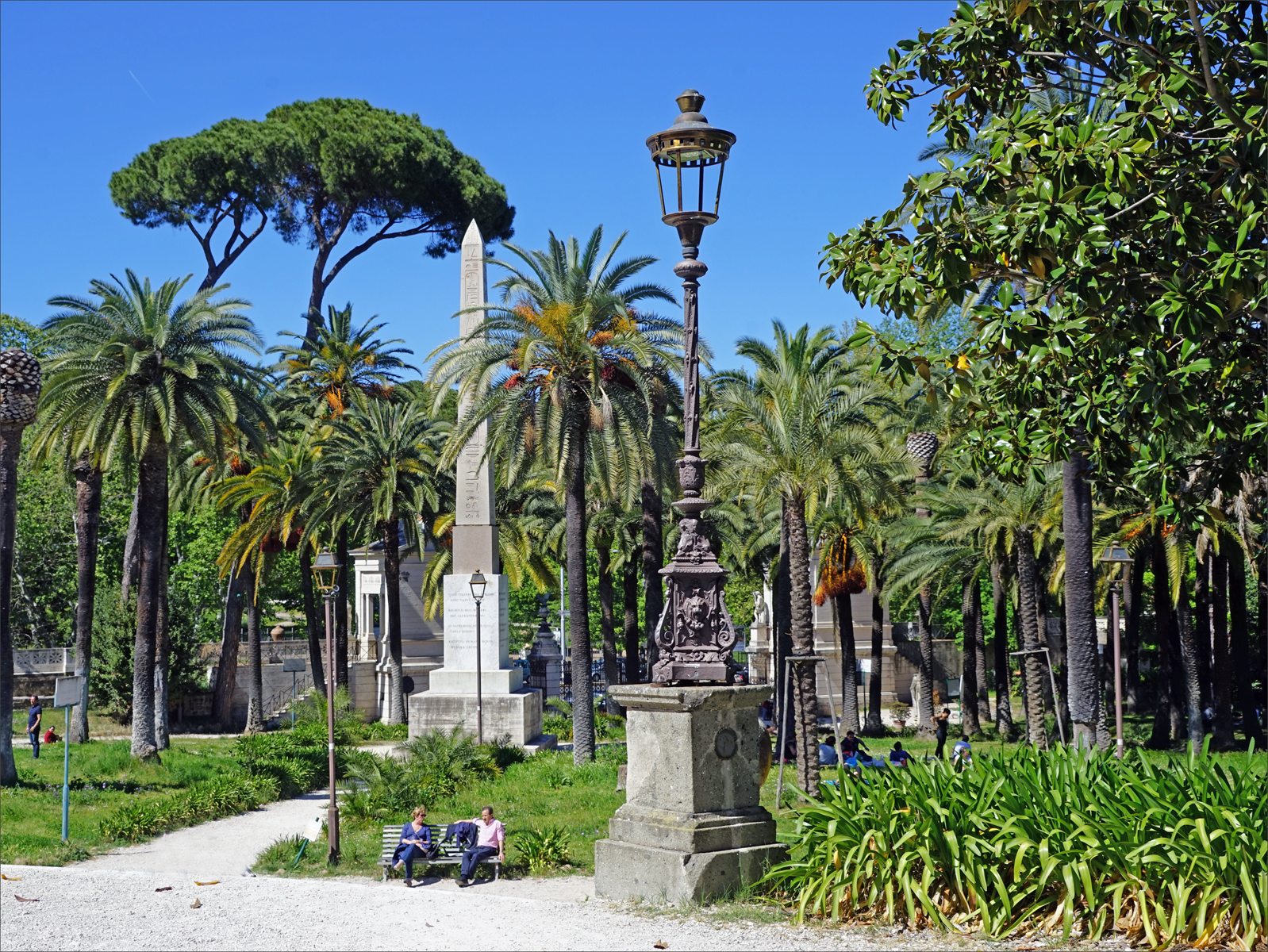
Villa Torlonia garden

=== Headquarters of National Agencies ===
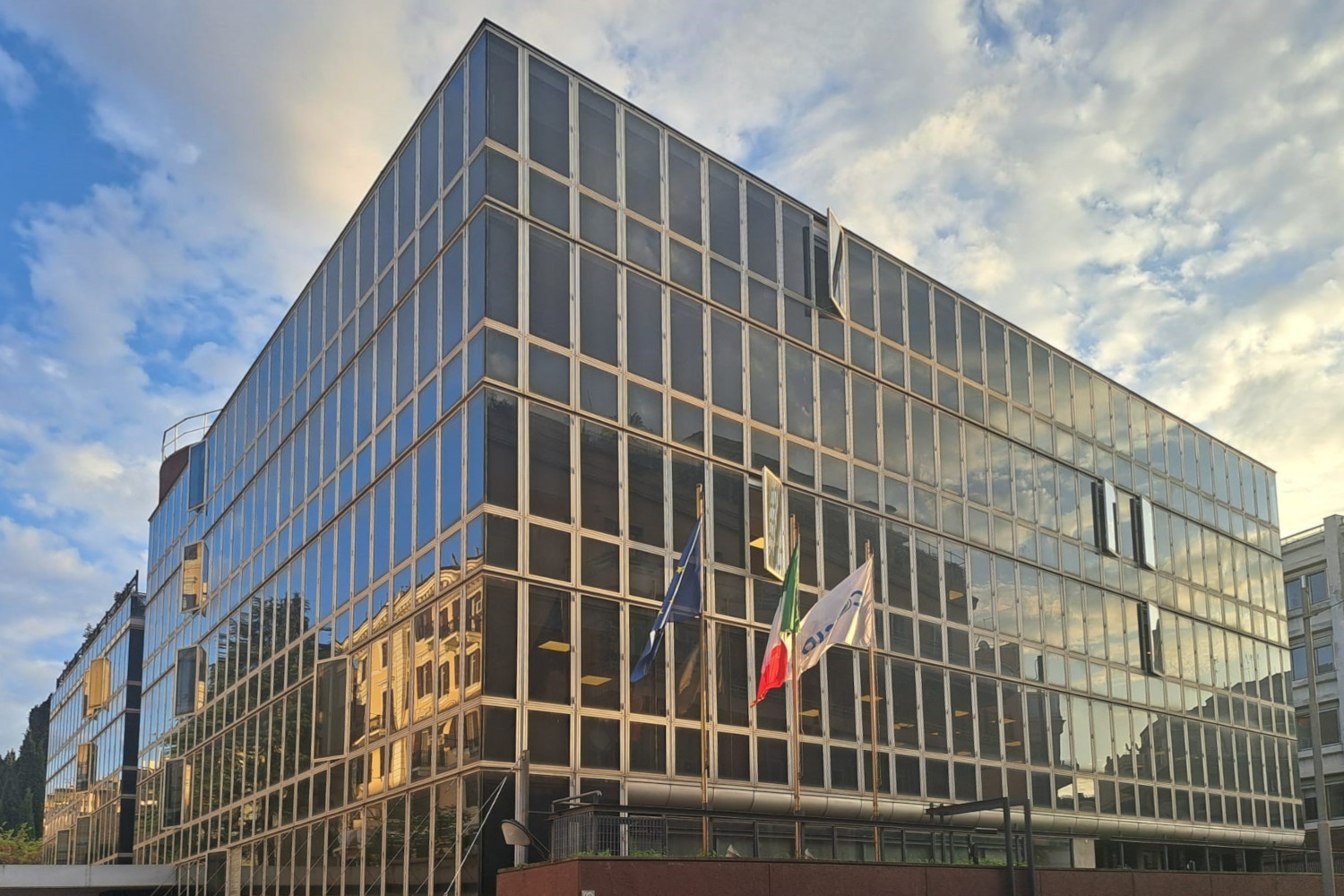
Consip S.p.A. national headquarter.

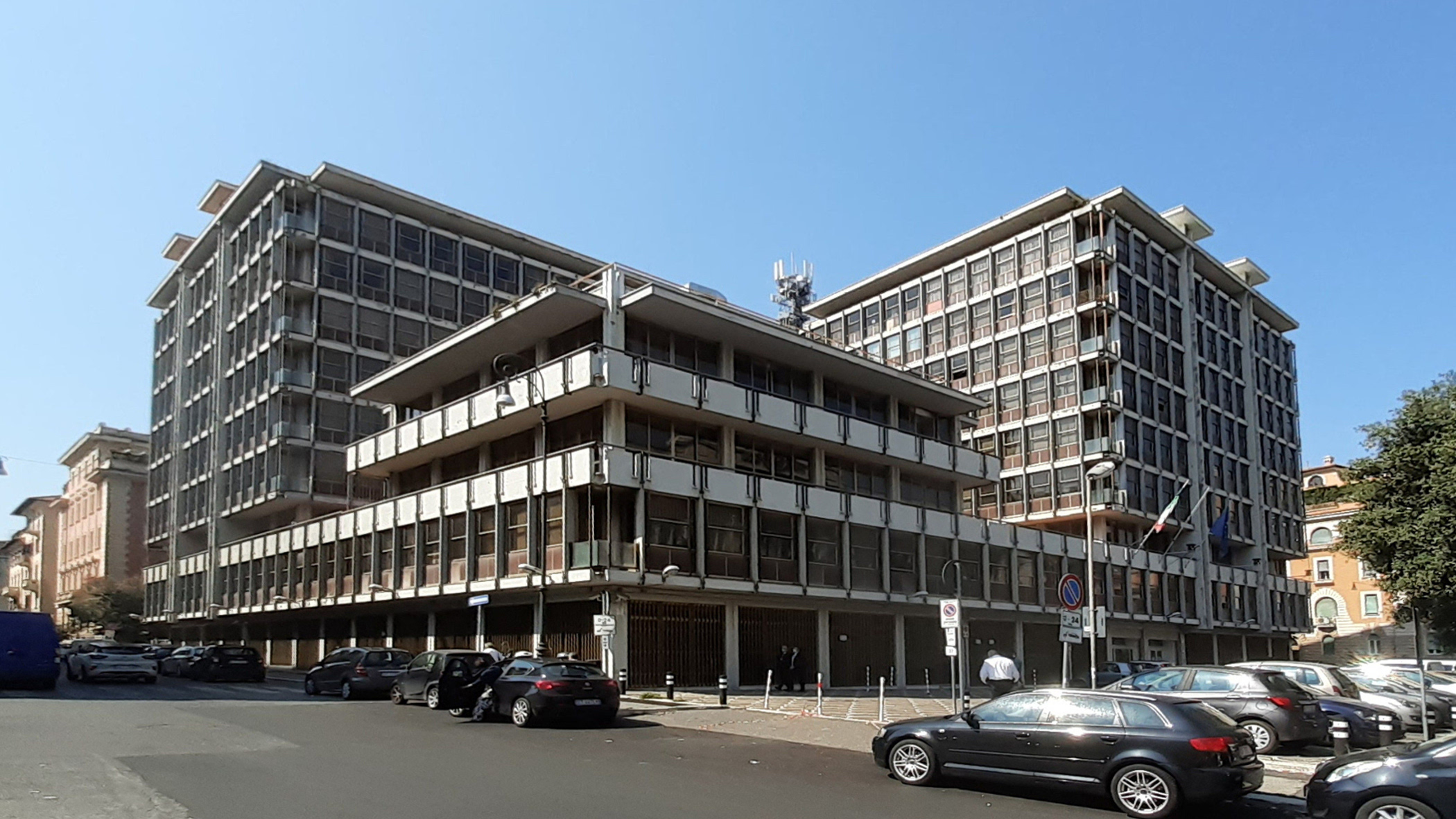
CONSOB national headquarter.

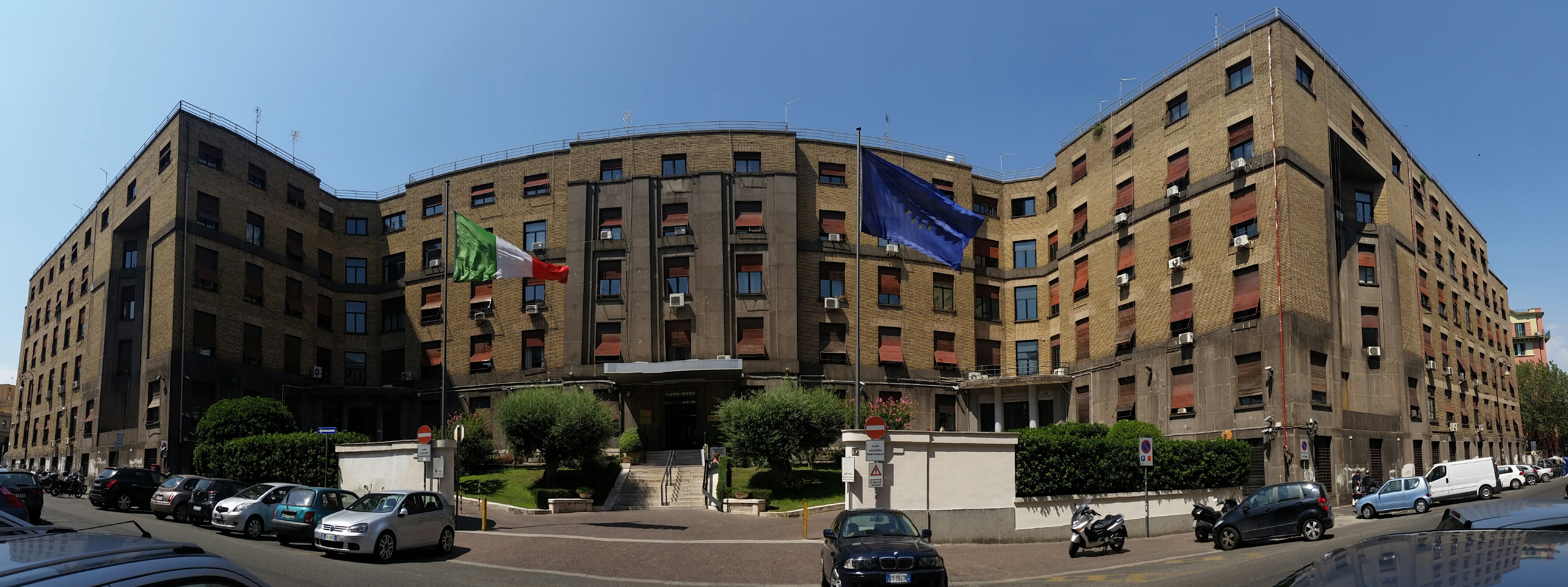
ANAS S.p.A. national headquarter.

Municipio II hosts a prominent cluster of institutional headquarters of national importance within its territory. These entities encompass independent administrative authorities, specialized government agencies, and public corporations responsible for procurement, cybersecurity, market regulation, public health, national infrastructure, and essential services in Italy. The high concentration of these offices is deeply tied to the urban and historical development of the municipal territory following the Unification of Italy. When Rome became the capital of the Kingdom of Italy in 1871, the city walls expanded outward, and the newly established quarters of Nomentano, Salario, Parioli, and Flaminio were designed to serve as high-end residential, financial, and executive corporate districts. This expansion drew institutions away from the congested historic center to modern, campus-like facilities connected by wide avenues.

In the Salario district, a significant administrative hub is formed by the presence of AGCOM (Authority for Communications Guarantees), Consip S.p.A. (the Public Procurement Agency), and the ACN (National Cybersecurity Agency). AGCOM, the independent regulatory and supervisory authority for the telecommunications, audiovisual, and publishing markets, moved its primary operational and representative Roman headquarters to via Isonzo 21/b in January 2010. Immediately adjacent at via Isonzo 19/E are the corporate and administrative headquarters of Consip, a public stock company entirely owned by the Italian Ministry of Economy and Finance (MEF) that acts as the central purchasing body for the entire Italian public administration. Directly facing this hub along the historical arterial road is the National Cybersecurity Agency, located at Corso d'Italia 41, which serves as the apex public authority coordinating Italy’s digital defense and cyber resilience.

The Nomentano quarter houses several technical, regulatory, and public health institutions. ARAN (Agency for the Collective Bargaining Representation of Public Administrations), the technical body that legally represents public administrations during national collective bargaining cycles, operates from its central headquarters at via Giovanni Battista Morgagni 30/E. Nearby, in the Nomentano-Salario transition zone, Accredia (the Italian Accreditation Body) maintains one of its main operating bases and secondary institutional offices at viale Regina Margherita 262, serving as the sole national non-profit organization appointed by the Italian government to attest the competence and neutrality of calibration and testing laboratories. Additionally, the landmark campus of the Istituto Superiore di Sanità (ISS / Italian National Institute of Health) sits prominently at viale Regina Elena 299, acting as the main public technical-scientific body of the Italian National Health Service.

Other major agencies are located closer to the municipal borders and waterways. The general management and registered office of the public infrastructure giant ANAS S.p.A. (a subsidiary of the Ferrovie dello Stato Italiane Group) are housed in the historic corporate complex at via Monzambano 10, located directly on the border between Municipio I and Municipio II near Castro Pretorio. Meanwhile, the Flaminio district hosts the primary administrative base and registered office of ENEA (National Agency for New Technologies, Energy and Sustainable Economic Development), situated at Lungotevere Grande Ammiraglio Thaon di Revel 76, where the public research body focuses on green energy, sustainable environmental solutions, and technological innovation.

The dense logistical corridor of Municipio II is further anchored by its close proximity to major institutional landmarks located across its borders in neighboring Municipio I. These adjacent hubs include the Ministry of Infrastructure and Transport (MIT) situated at Piazzale Porta Pia, and the extensive complex of the Ministry of Economy and Finance (MEF) on Via XX Settembre, providing a continuous physical connection between executive ministries and the independent regulatory agencies that execute national policy.

== Education ==
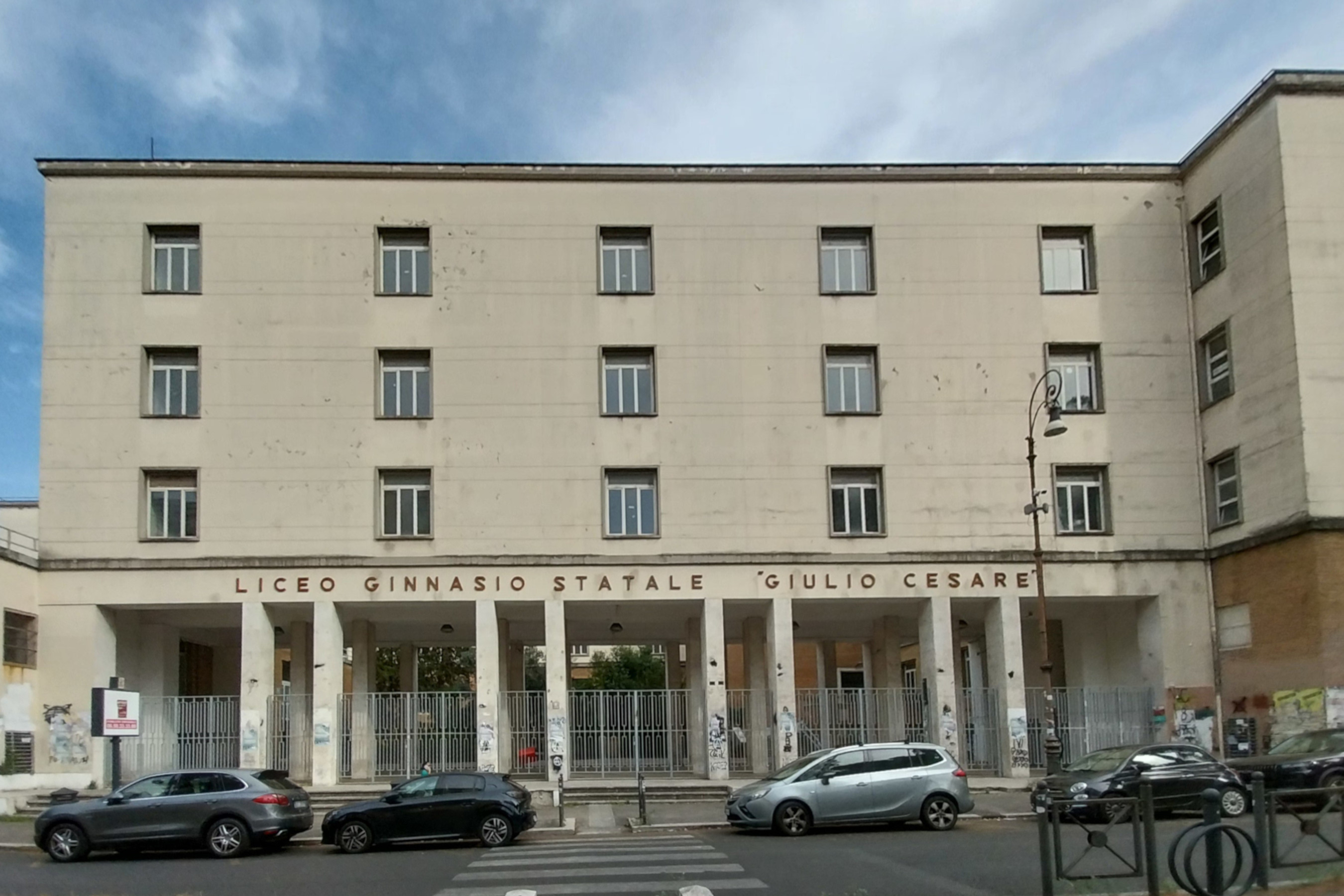
The notorious Liceo Giulio Cesare in Corso Trieste.

The socio-cultural fabric of Municipio II is profoundly shaped by its exceptional concentration of educational institutions, acting as one of the primary academic and intellectual hubs of the metropolitan area of Rome.

=== Upper secondary schools ===
==== Licei ====
The municipio hosts a network of prestigious state-run high schools (scuole secondarie di secondo grado) known for their historical impact and academic standing:

- Liceo Giulio Cesare – Located in the Trieste quarter, this historical classical school is renowned for its deep-rooted student traditions and academic heritage.
- Liceo Augusto Righi – A premier scientific high school that serves as a benchmark for technical and scientific education within the central-northern sector of the city.
- Liceo Statale Maria Montessori – A specialized institution that integrates the traditional public high school framework with the pedagogical methodologies founded by Maria Montessori.

==== Higher Education and Academies ====
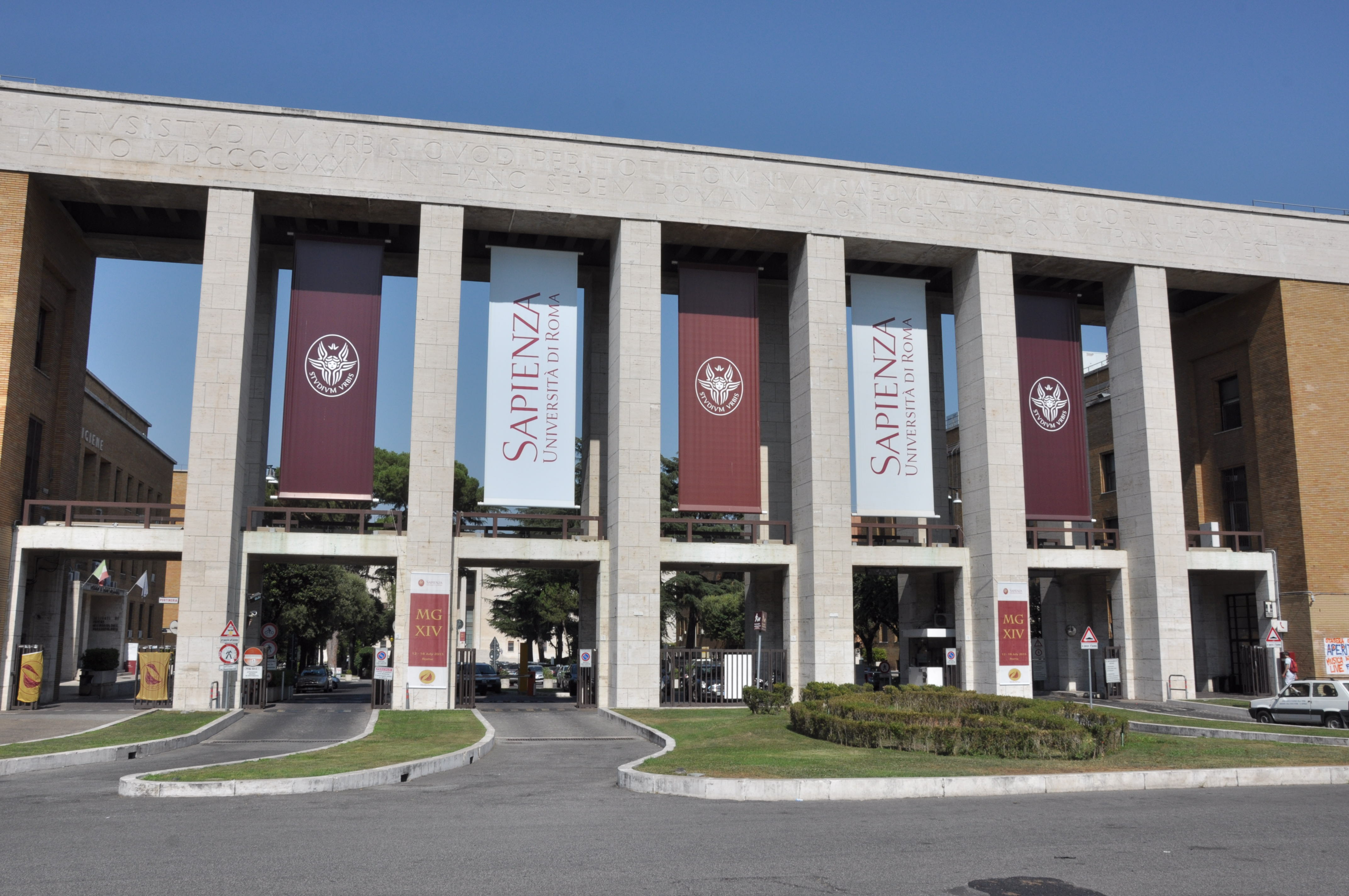
Sapienza University campus main entrance.

At the university level, the territory features a massive student population distributed across world-class public, private, and artistic institutions:

- Sapienza University of Rome – The San Lorenzo neighborhood hosts the historical main campus ("Città universitaria"), a monumental Rationalist complex inaugurated in 1935 under the master plan of Marcello Piacentini.
- LUISS University – A premier private university specializing in social sciences, politics, and business, with its main historical campus located at Viale Romania inside the former estate of the Count de Héritz.
- UnitelmaSapienza – A digital-focused university that maintains strong institutional and cultural synergies with the municipal administration.
- Rome University of Fine Arts (RUFA) – A contemporary multidisciplinary academy located in the Trieste neighborhood, focusing on fine arts, design, and media.

=== Foreign schools and academies ===
The territory of Municipio II hosts a well-established network of international educational institutions that cover the entire academic cycle, from early childhood education to the high school diploma. Among the historic Francophone entities, the Lycée Chateaubriand stands out, operating under the management of the Agency for French Education Abroad (AEFE); its Villa Patrizi campus integrates French ministerial curricula, leading students to the completion of the Baccalauréat.

Municipio II is home to several centers of higher education and institutions dedicated to scientific and artistic culture. Among these is the German Academy Rome Villa Massimo, located on the grounds of the historic Villa Massimo. The academy hosts residents working in contemporary German art, literature and music, and organizes public exhibitions and concerts.

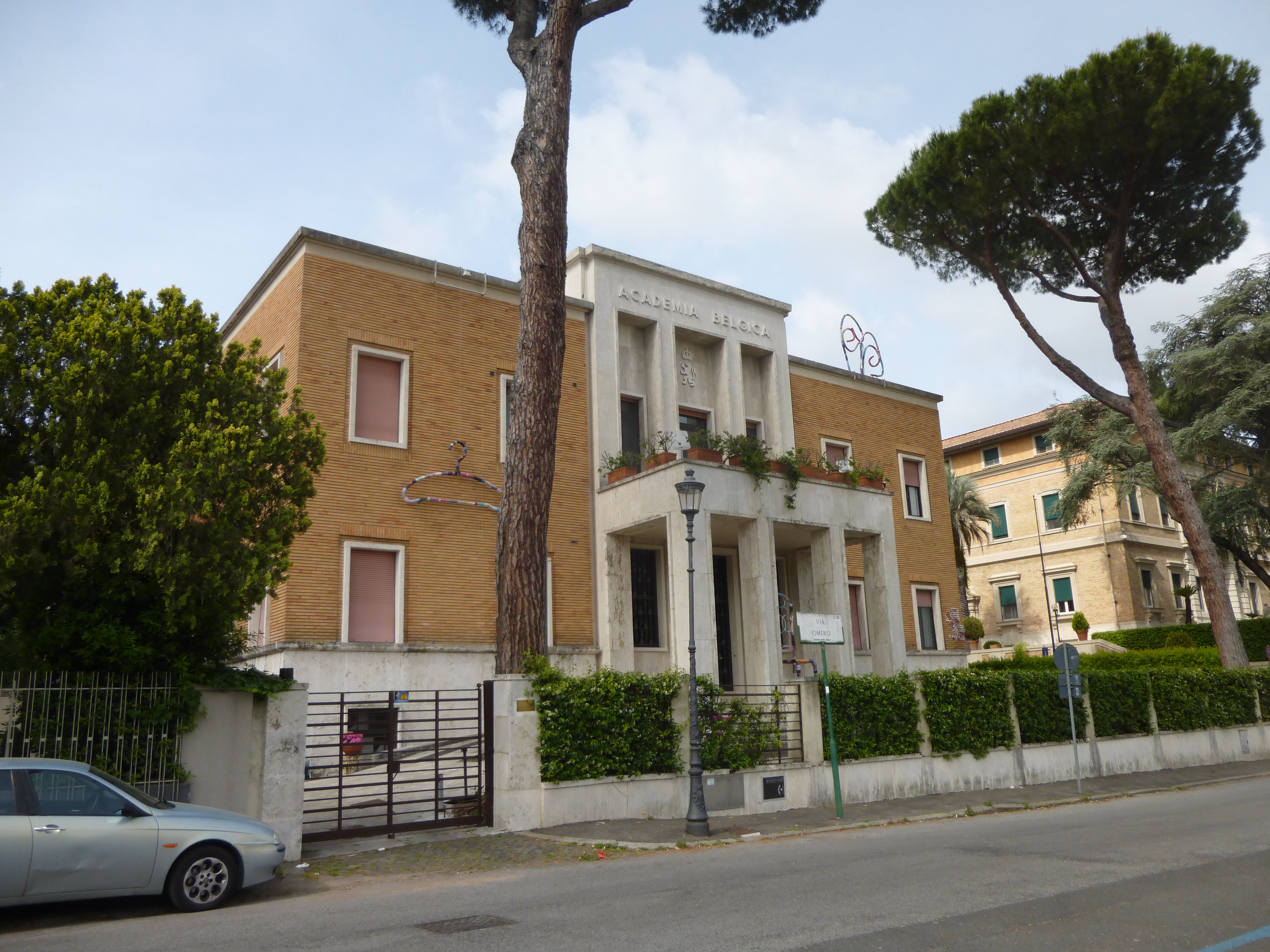
Academia Belgica

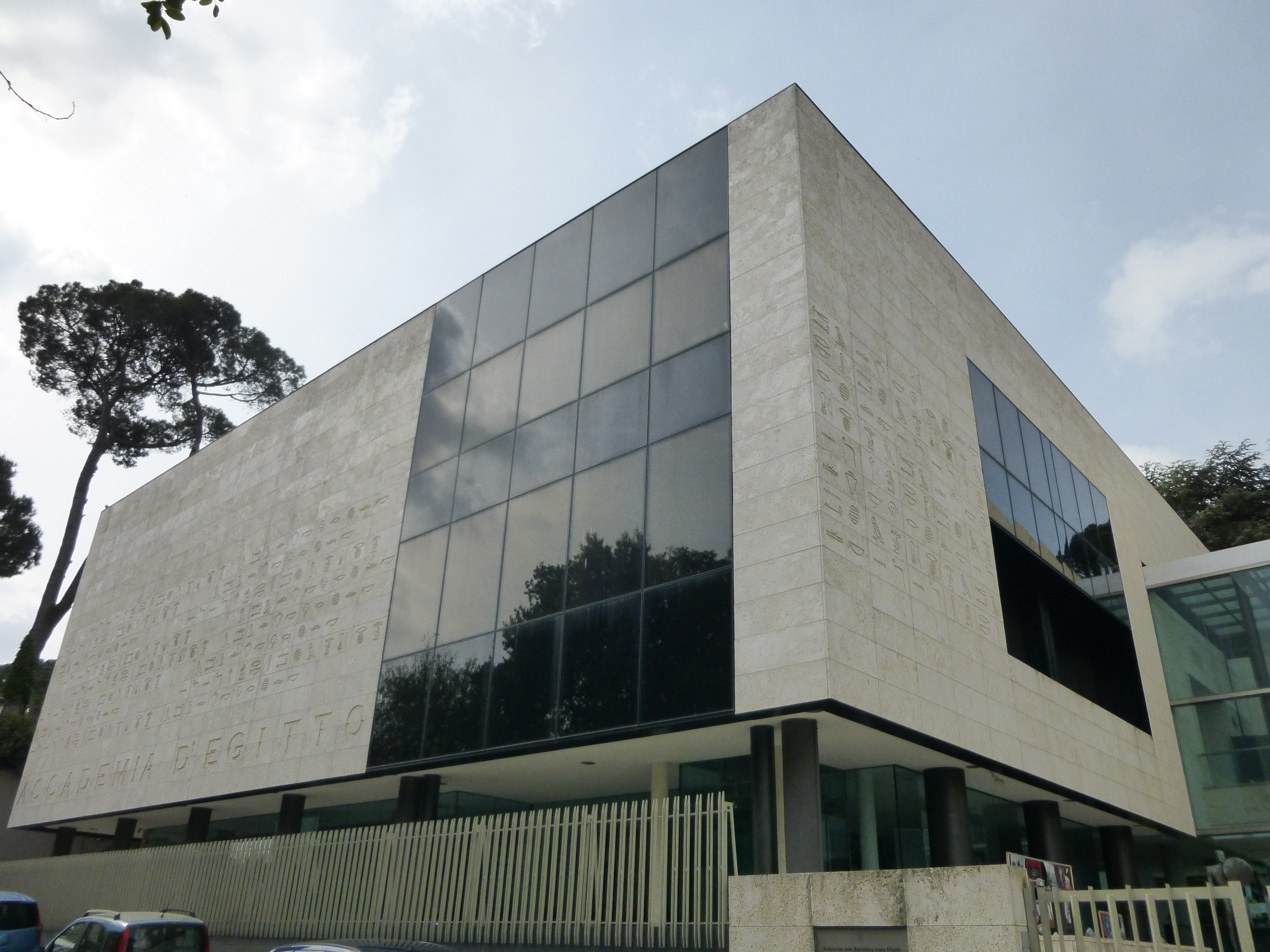
Academy of Egypt

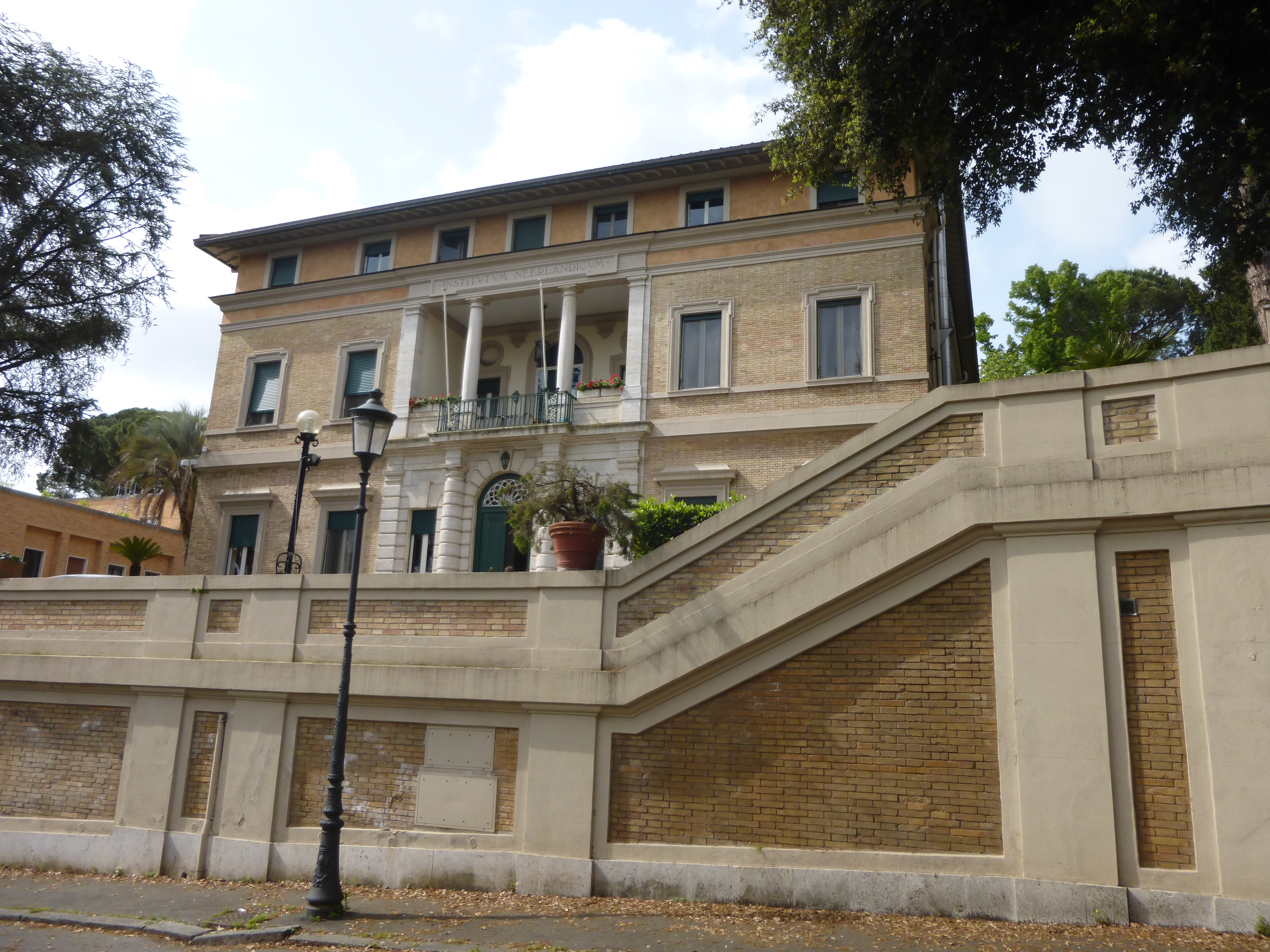
Scientific Institute of the Netherlands

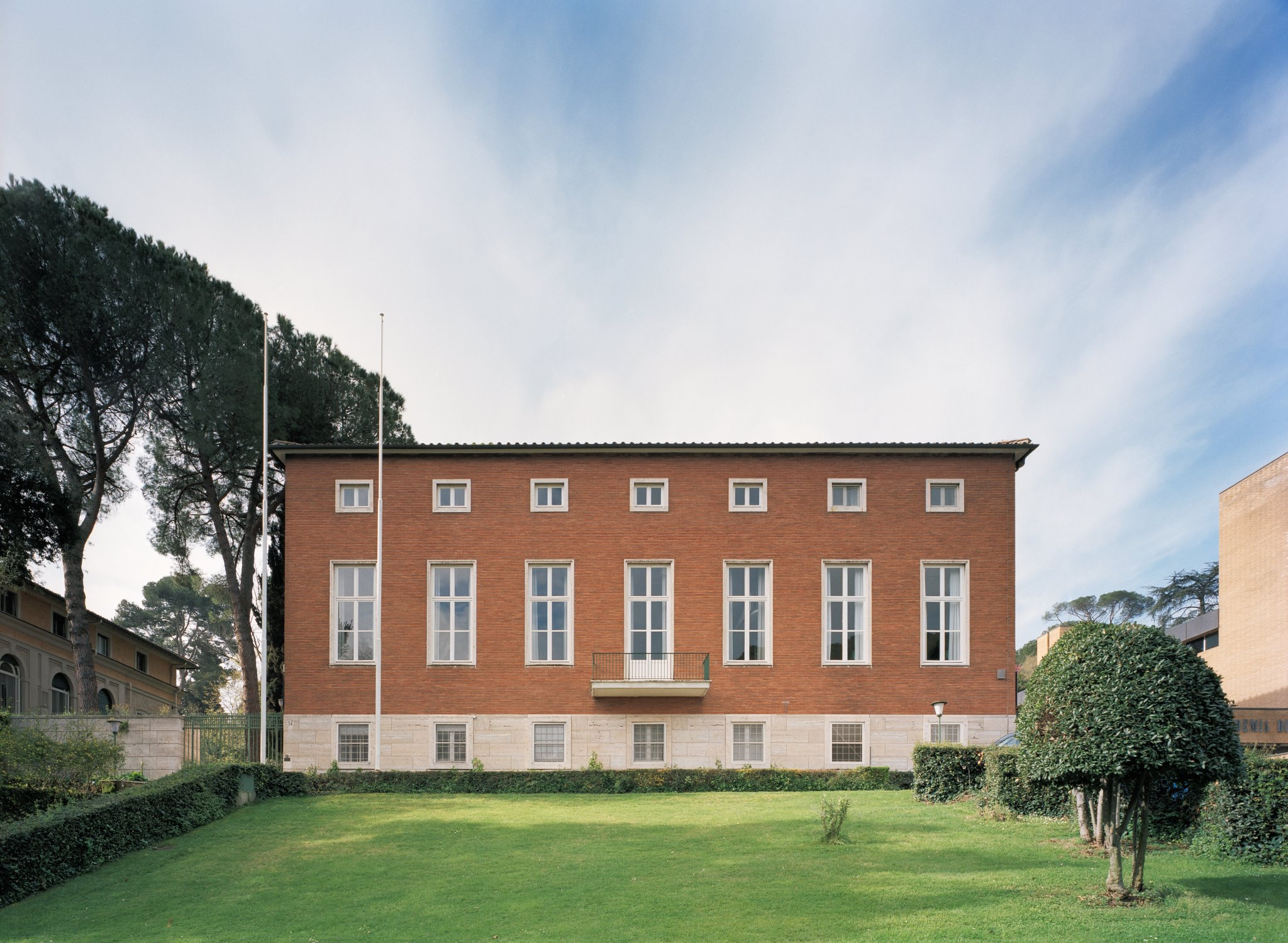
Swedish Institute

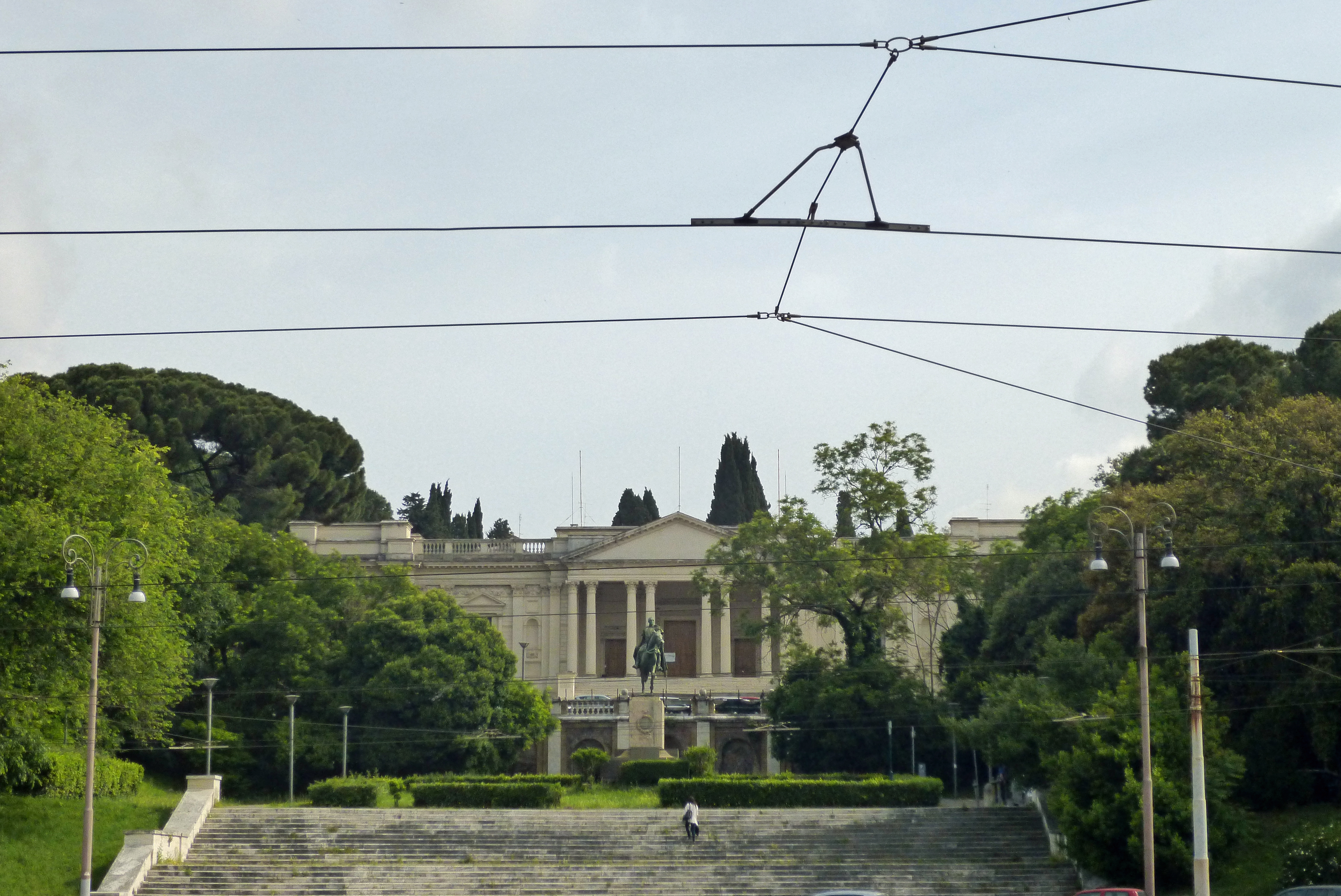
The British School

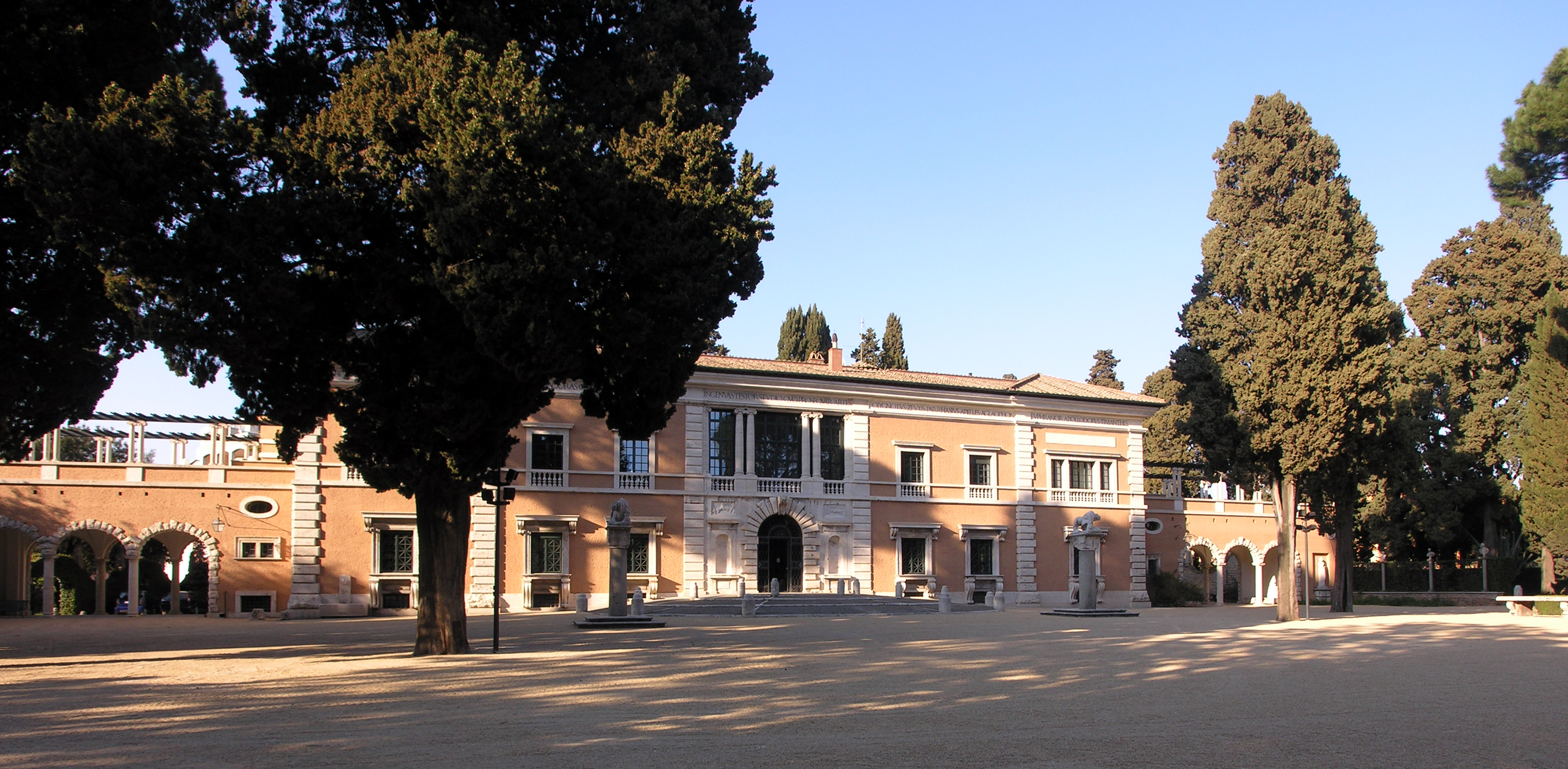
German Academy

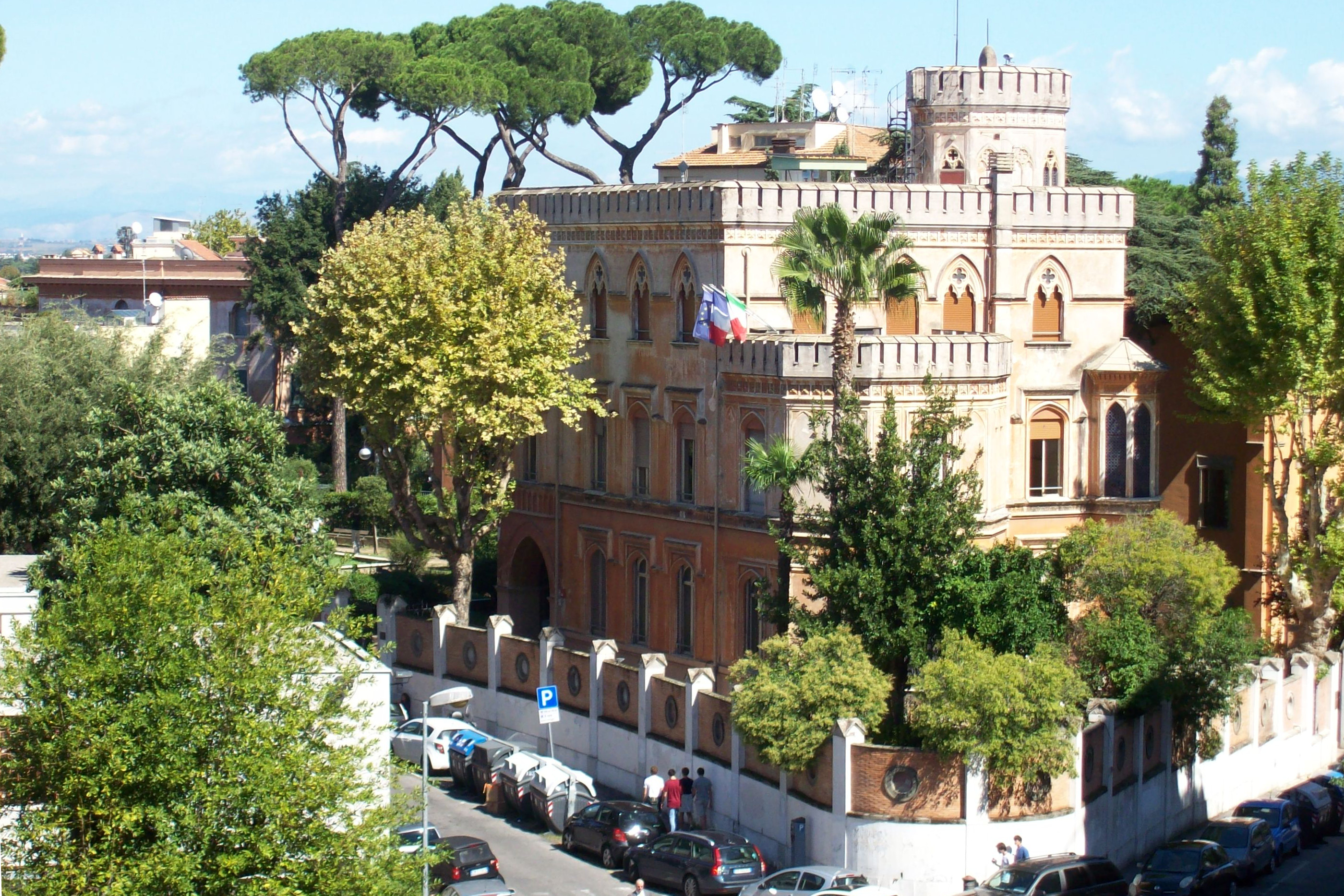
Lycée français Chateaubriand

== Culture ==
=== Libraries ===
The academic and residential character of Municipio II is supported by a well-distributed network of public municipal libraries belonging to the official Biblioteche di Roma institution. These centers provide crucial gathering spaces, study areas, and specialized cultural archives for the local community:

- European Library – Situated in the Salario neighborhood (Via Savoia), this specialized institution focuses on European integration and intercultural dialogue. It is renowned for its vast multilingual catalogue, which includes multimedia language courses, travel guides, and foreign-language literature for children and adults.
- Tullio De Mauro – Located inside the historic park of Villa Mercede within the San Lorenzo district, it was renamed in 2017 to honor the prominent Italian linguist Tullio De Mauro, who served as the first president of the Istituzione Biblioteche di Roma. The facility acts as a major neighborhood hub providing local lending services and cross-system resource sharing (interbibliotecario).
- Biblioteca Flaminia – Positioned in the Flaminio quarter (Via Cesare Fracassini), this library is integrated into the local urban fabric and features a quiet courtyard alongside dedicated special collections focusing on local history, contemporary art, and specialized sections for children.
- Biblioteca Villa Leopardi – Nestled within the public park of Villa Leopardi in the Trieste district, this library combines green open spaces with reading rooms, placing an emphasis on environmental education, family reading groups, and community workshops.

=== Museums ===
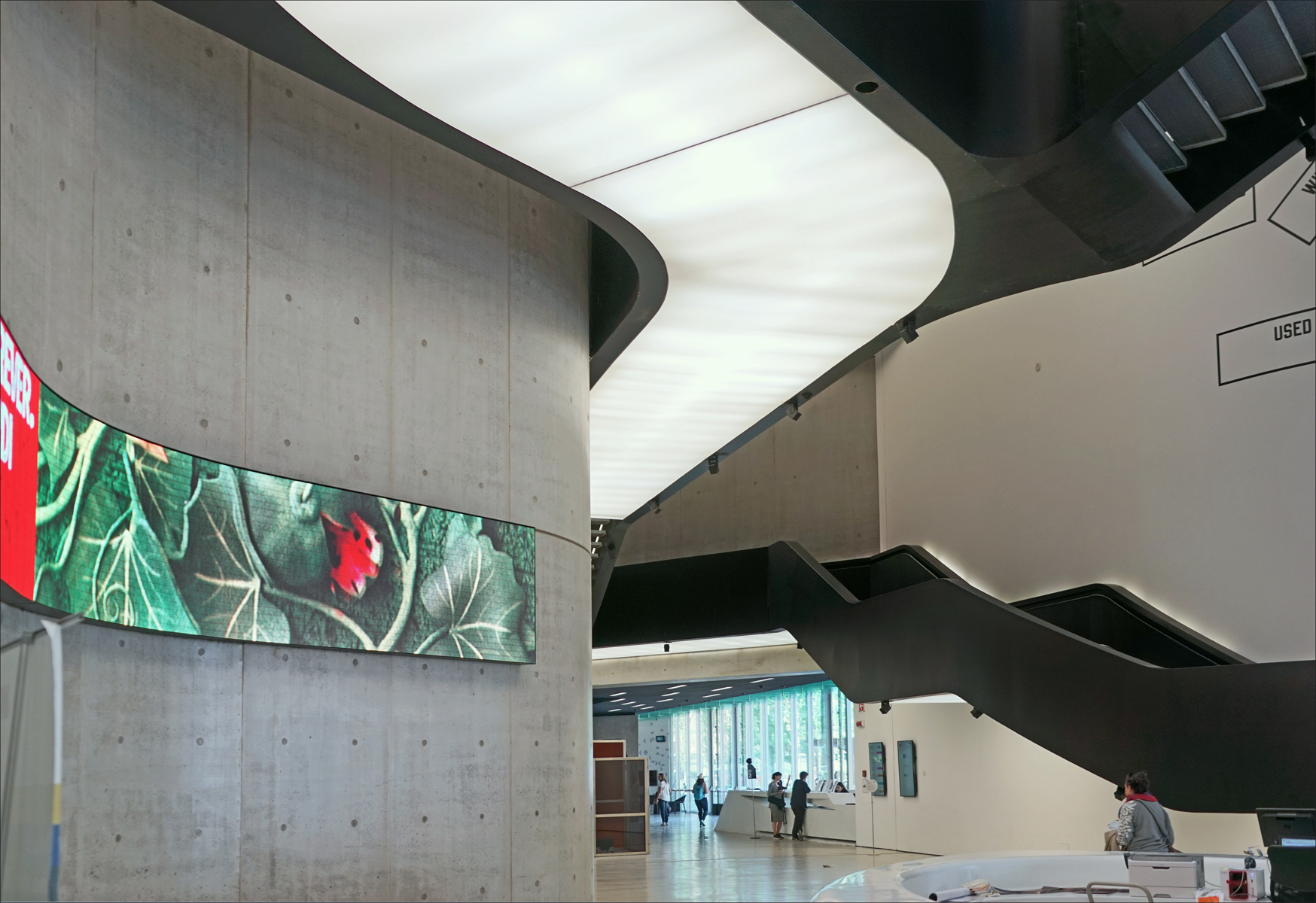
MAXXI museum.

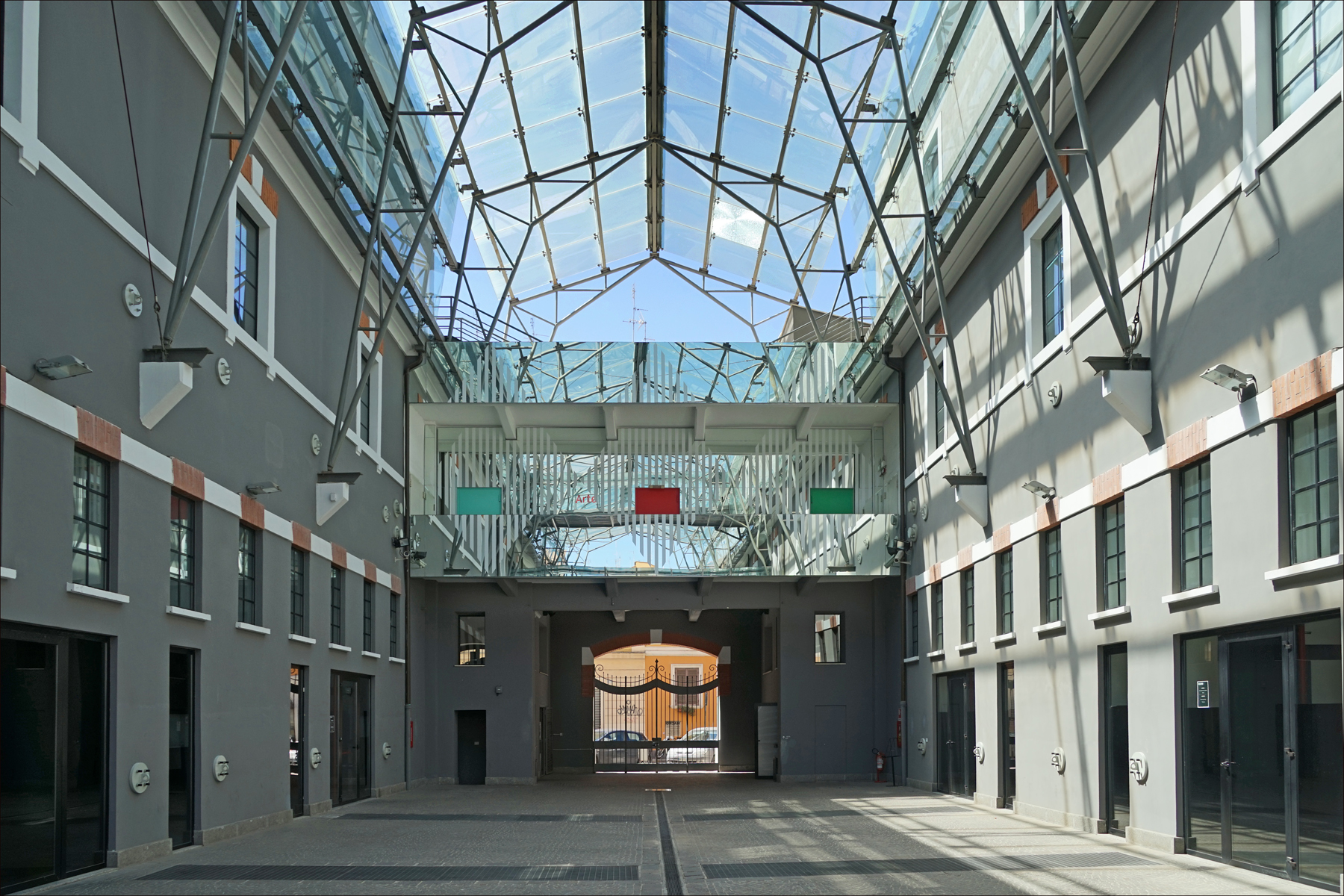
MACRO museum.

The museum network spans from high-renaissance noble collections to avant-garde post-modern spaces, distributed across the historical villas and renovated industrial zones of the district:

- MAXXI (Museo nazionale delle arti del XXI secolo) – Located in the Flaminio quarter, this is Italy's first national institution dedicated entirely to contemporary creativity and architecture. The museum itself is a landmark of contemporary deconstructivist architecture, designed by Anglo-Iraqi architect Zaha Hadid and opened in 2010.
- Galleria Nazionale d'Arte Moderna e Contemporanea (GNAM) – Positioned along Viale delle Belle Arti, this monumental palace houses the most comprehensive collection of 19th and 20th-century art in Italy, displaying masterpieces from international and national movements, including works by Van Gogh, Monet, and Modigliani.
- MACRO (Museo d'Arte Contemporanea di Roma) – Set inside a beautifully repurposed early 20th-century Peroni brewery in the Salario-Nomentano district, this civic gallery focuses on experimental contemporary art, site-specific installations, and regional post-WWII artistic developments.

=== Auditorium Parco della Musica ===
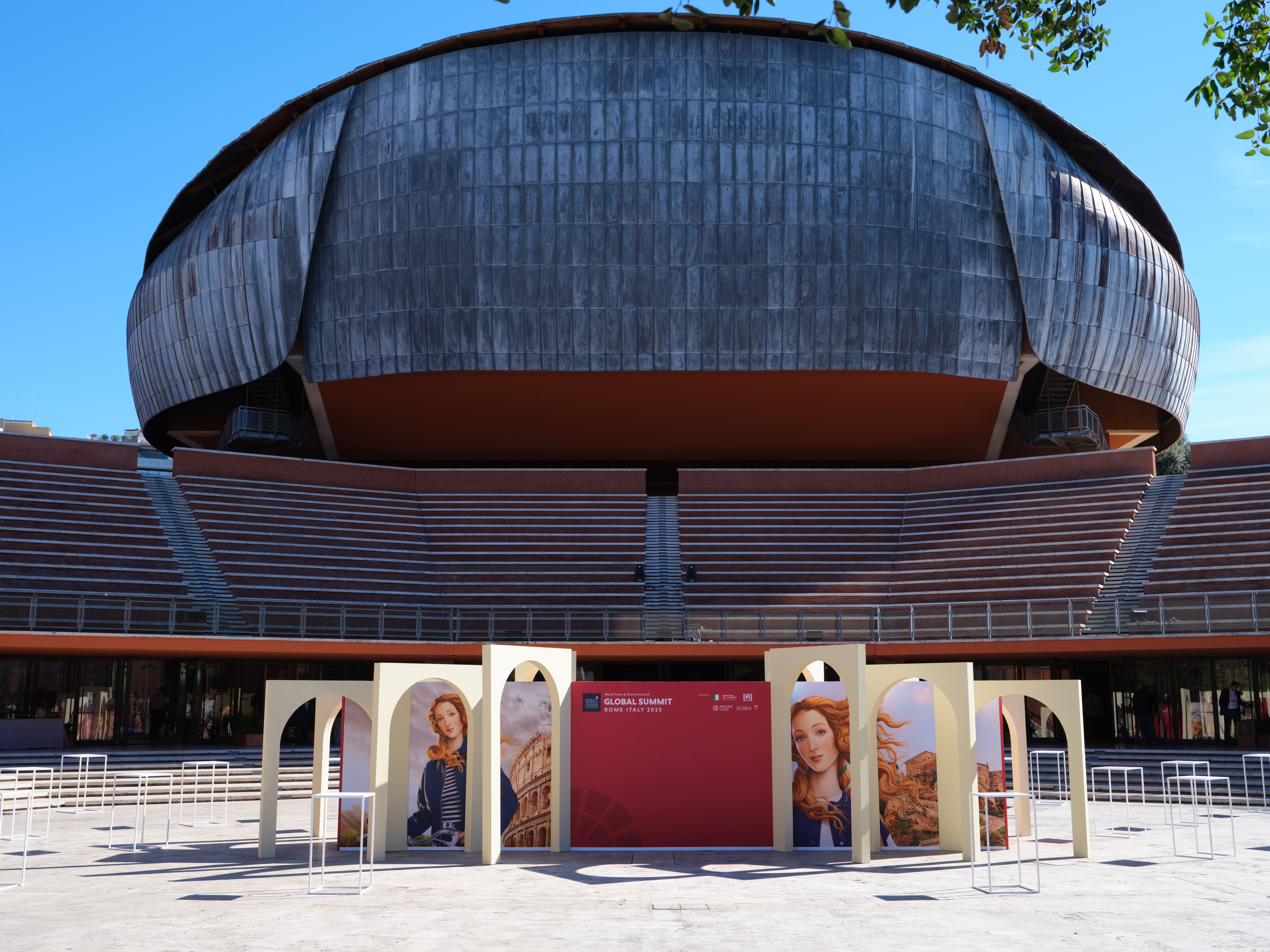
Auditorium Parco della Musica in Parioli district.

A cornerstone of the modern cultural and architectural landscape of Municipio II is the Auditorium Parco della Musica (officially dedicated to the composer Ennio Morricone). Situated in the Flaminio-Parioli sector between the green slopes of Villa Glori and the Olympic Village, this massive multifunctional complex represents one of the largest contemporary urban redevelopments and performing arts hubs in Europe. Designed by the Pritzker Prize-winning Italian architect Renzo Piano and inaugurated in 2002, the architectural complex is visually striking for its three large, independent concert halls. These structures are covered in lead sheets and modeled to resemble giant lutes or beetles, oriented symmetrically around a central open-air amphitheater called the Cavea, which serves as a vibrant outdoor performance space during the summer months.

The three primary interior structures are tailored with highly sophisticated, flexible acoustics designed to host different musical genres and events. The largest is the Sala Santa Cecilia, a massive 2,800-seat hall specifically engineered for symphonic concerts, featuring distinctive cherry-wood ceiling shells that naturally diffuse sound. The intermediate Sala Sinopoli functions as a highly flexible space dedicated to chamber music and contemporary dance, while the smaller Sala Petrassi is fully configured for theatrical plays, operas, and intimate jazz performances. Managed by the Fondazione Musica per Roma, the Auditorium serves as the official permanent home of the prestigious Accademia Nazionale di Santa Cecilia, and acts as the central venue for premier international cultural events, including the annual Rome Film Festival.

The complex is also notable for its seamless integration of ancient history into contemporary design. During the foundational excavation phase in 1994, workers uncovered the expansive architectural remains of a massive 6th-century BC Roman suburban villa. Renzo Piano intentionally adjusted the structural layout and footprint of the concert halls to protect and incorporate the ancient ruins. Today, the archaeological site is preserved at the heart of the complex and is complemented by a dedicated on-site museum that displays the retrieved artifacts, pottery, and structural elements to visitors.

== Transport ==
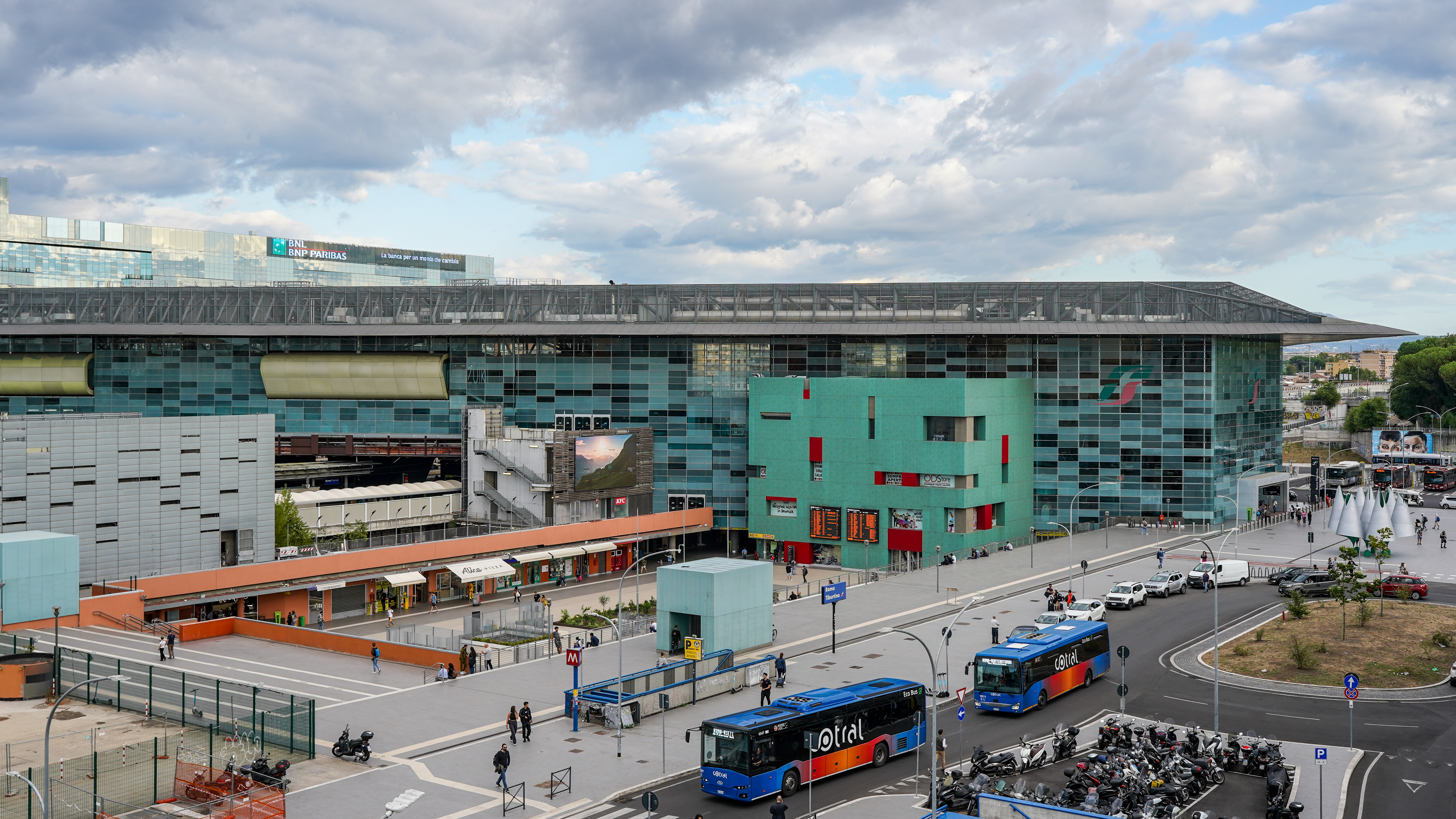
Roma Tiburtina railway station.

The geographical position of Municipio II makes it one of the most critical and highly connected infrastructural crossroads within the metropolitan transit network of Rome. The territory is intersected by high-speed rail systems, underground networks, tram lines, and major urban arteries.

Stations of Rome Metro in the Municipio II are:

- Flaminio
- Tiburtina, Policlinico, Bologna, Sant'Agnese/Annibaliano, Libia.

Stations of Lazio regional railways in the Municipio II are:

- Roma Nomentana, Roma Tiburtina
- Roma Tiburtina

Other major stations are:

- Piazzale Flaminio, Euclide, Acqua Acetosa, Campi Sportivi, Monte Antenne

Other major infrastructures are:

- Roma Tiburtina railway station – Situated on the eastern border of the municipio, it serves as the second largest railway station in Rome and a primary national hub for Italian high-speed rail services (Frecciarossa and Italo), bridging transit routes between northern and southern Italy.
- Autostazione Tibus – Positioned directly adjacent to Tiburtina station, this facility stands as Italy’s largest intercity bus terminal, acting as the central hub for major national and international long-distance coach operators like FlixBus and Itabus.

== Gallery ==
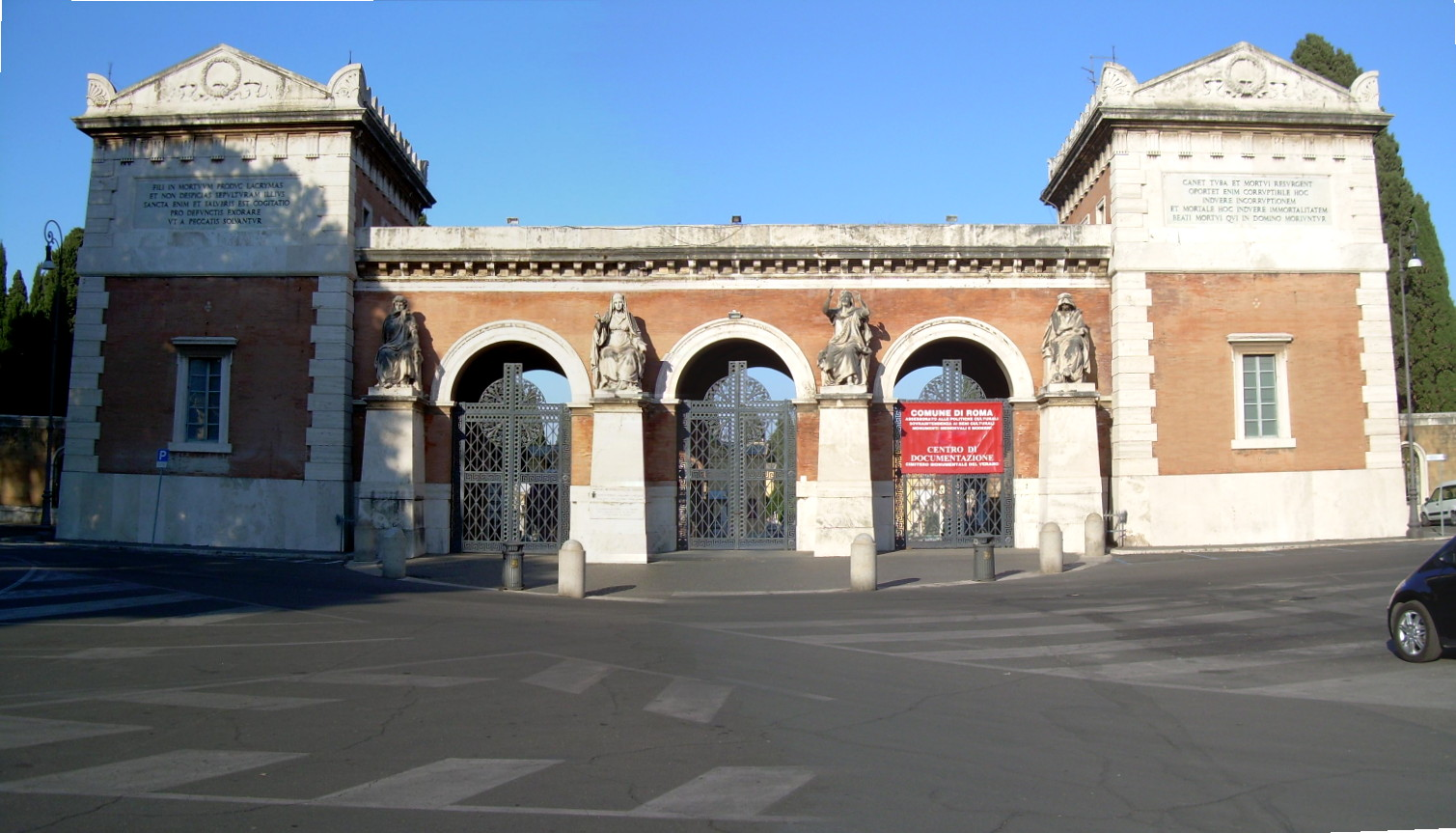
Campo Verano monumental cemetry

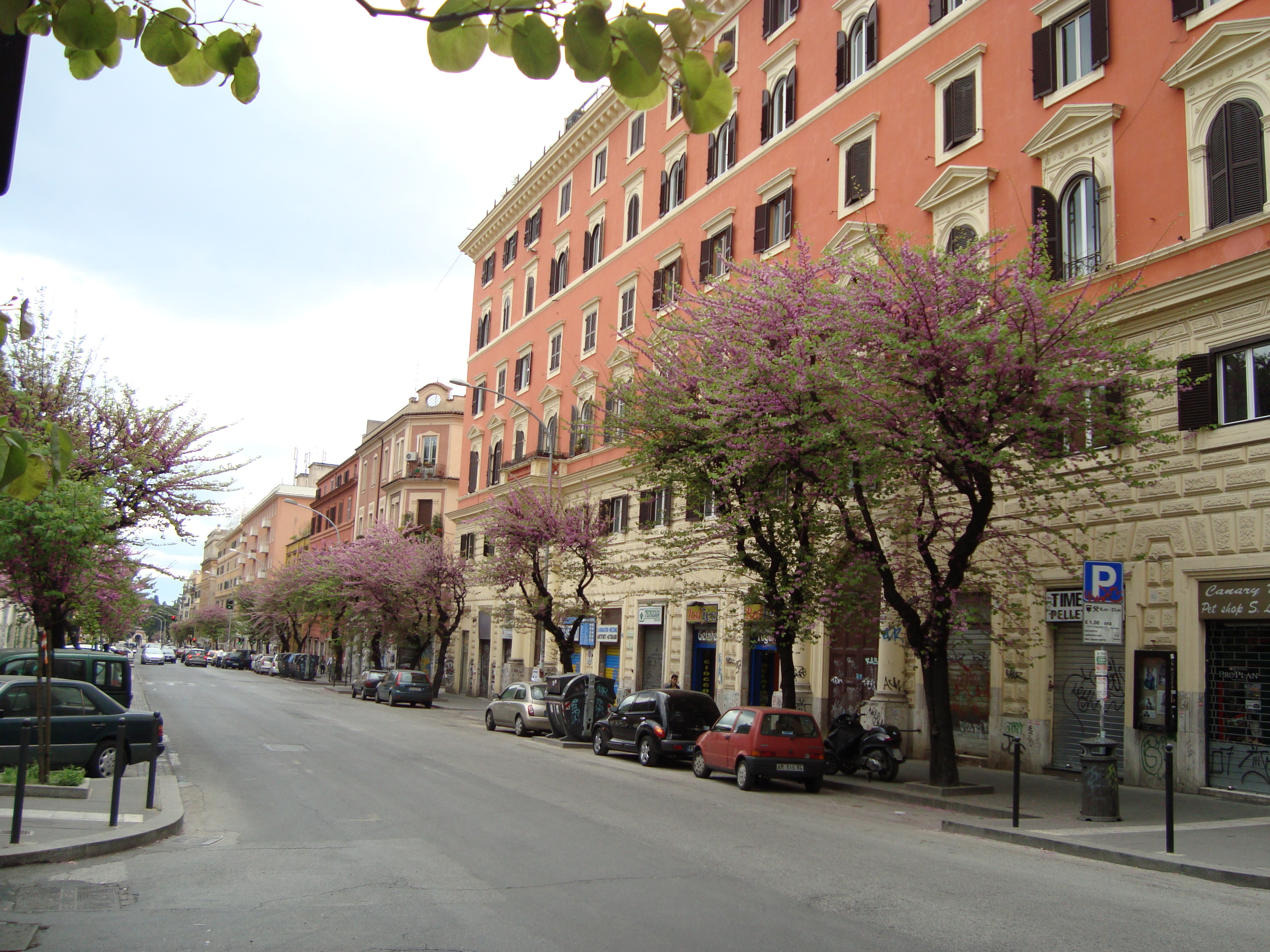
San Lorenzo

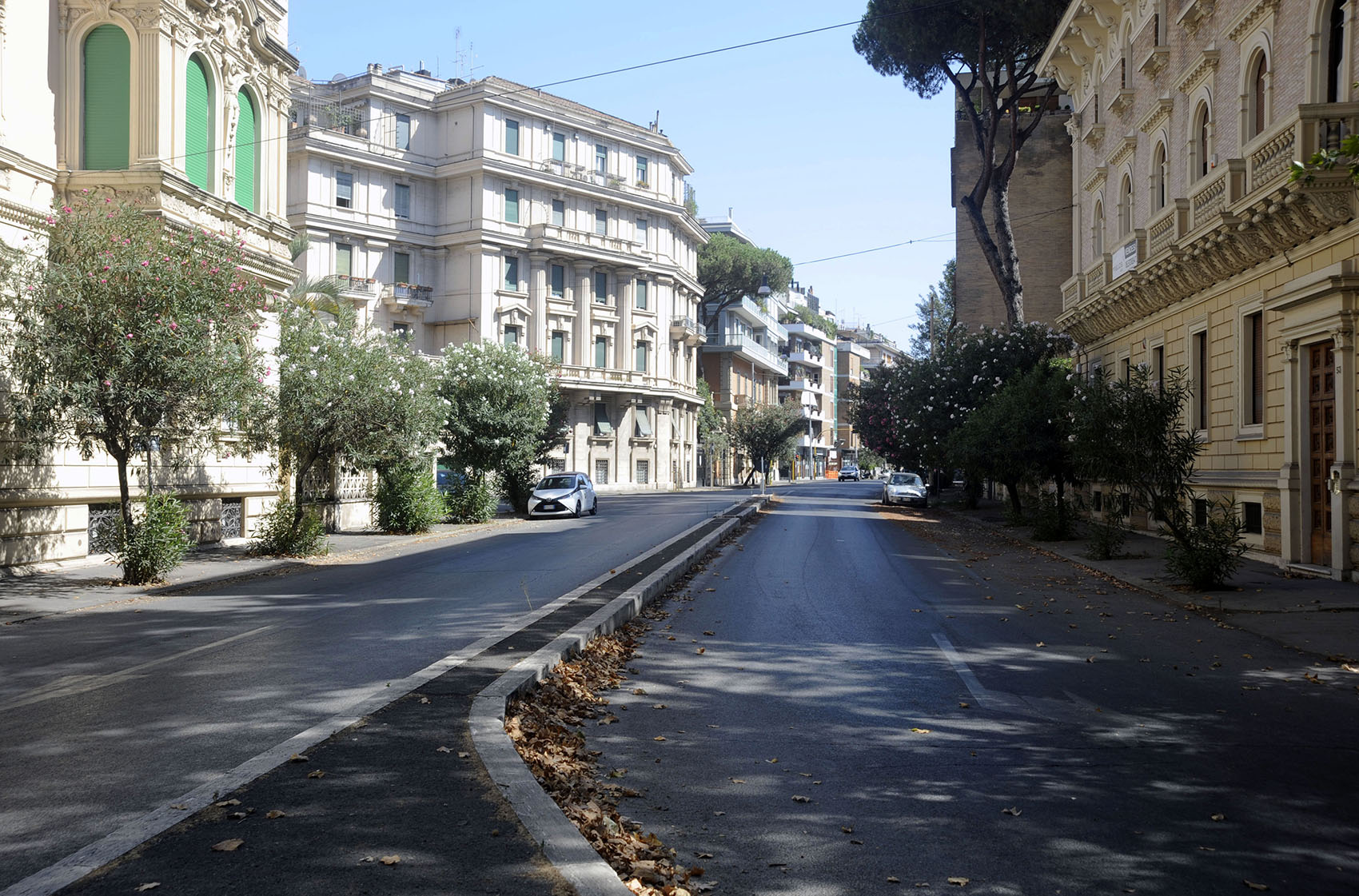
Parioli

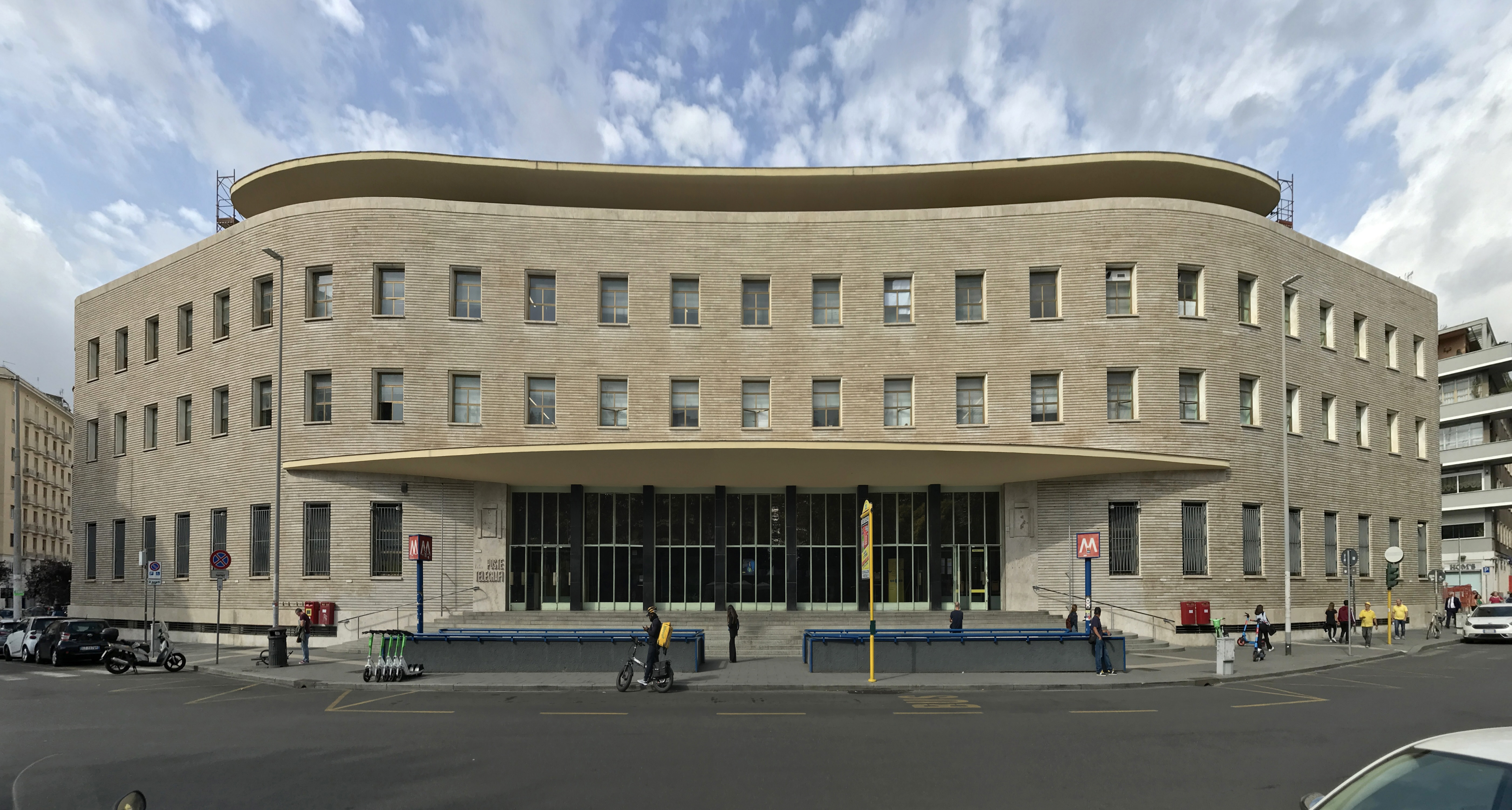
Rationalist style fascist-era post office in Piazza Bologna

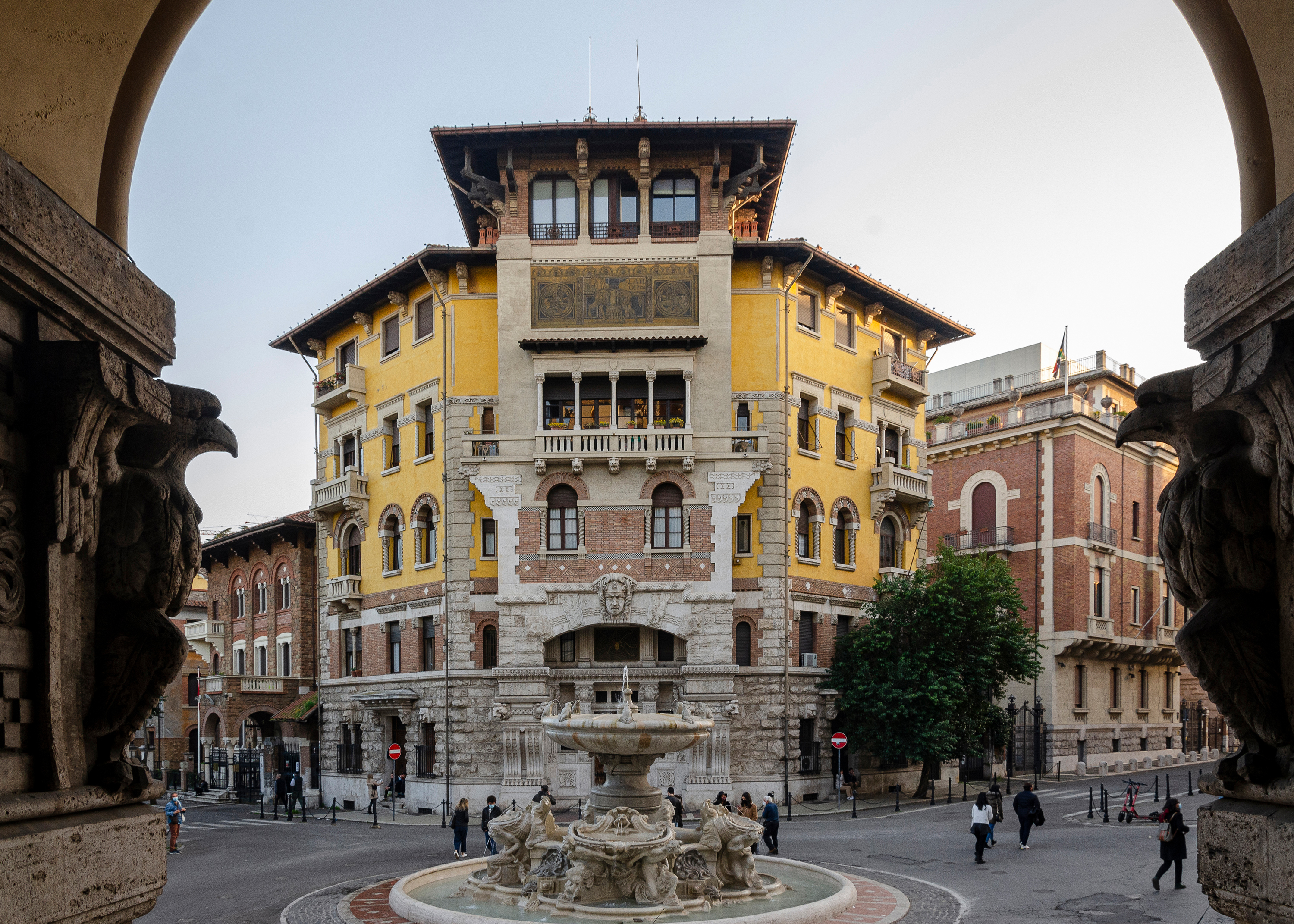
Palazzo del Ragno in Coppedè district

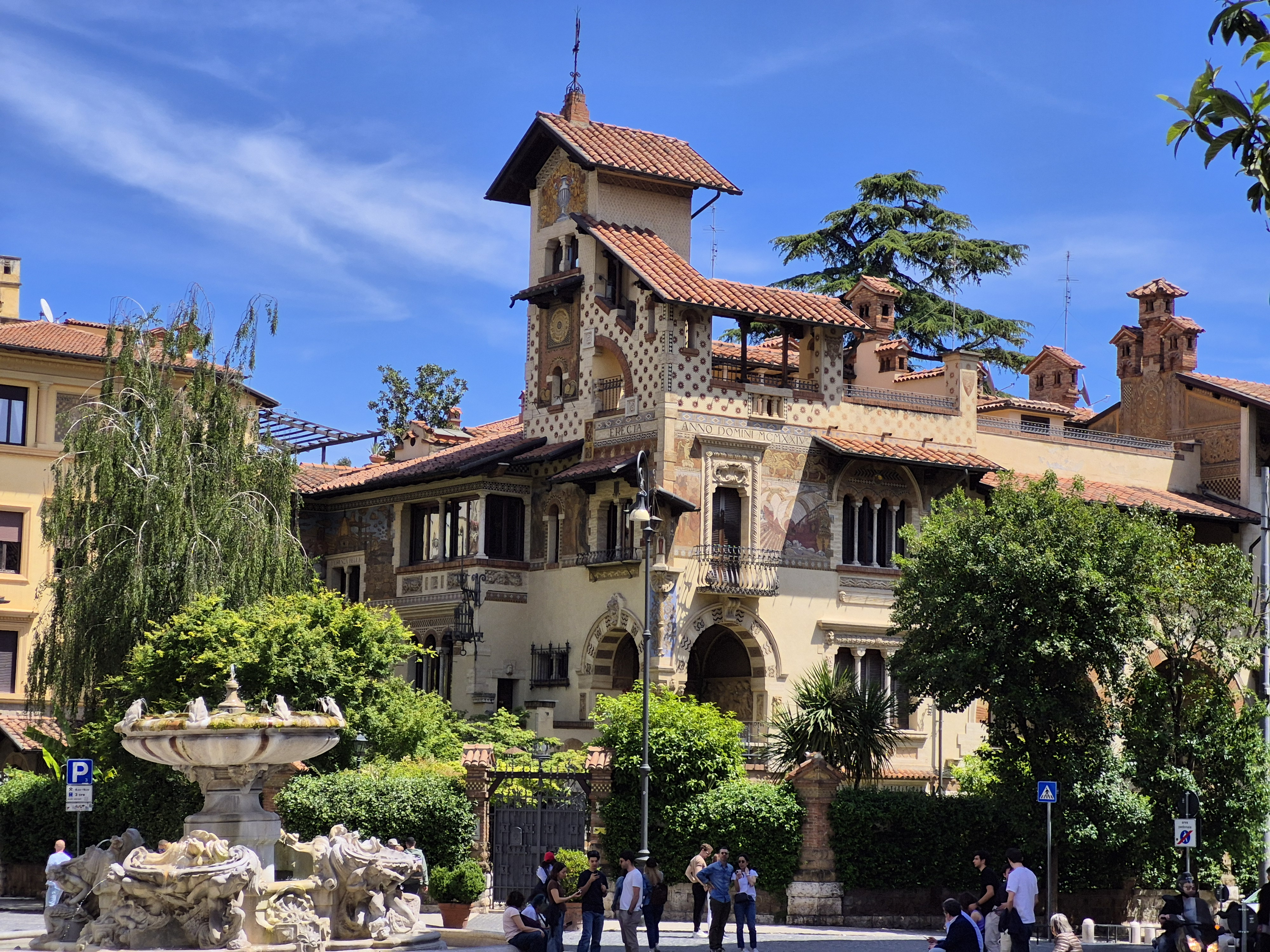
Villino delle Fate in Coppedè district

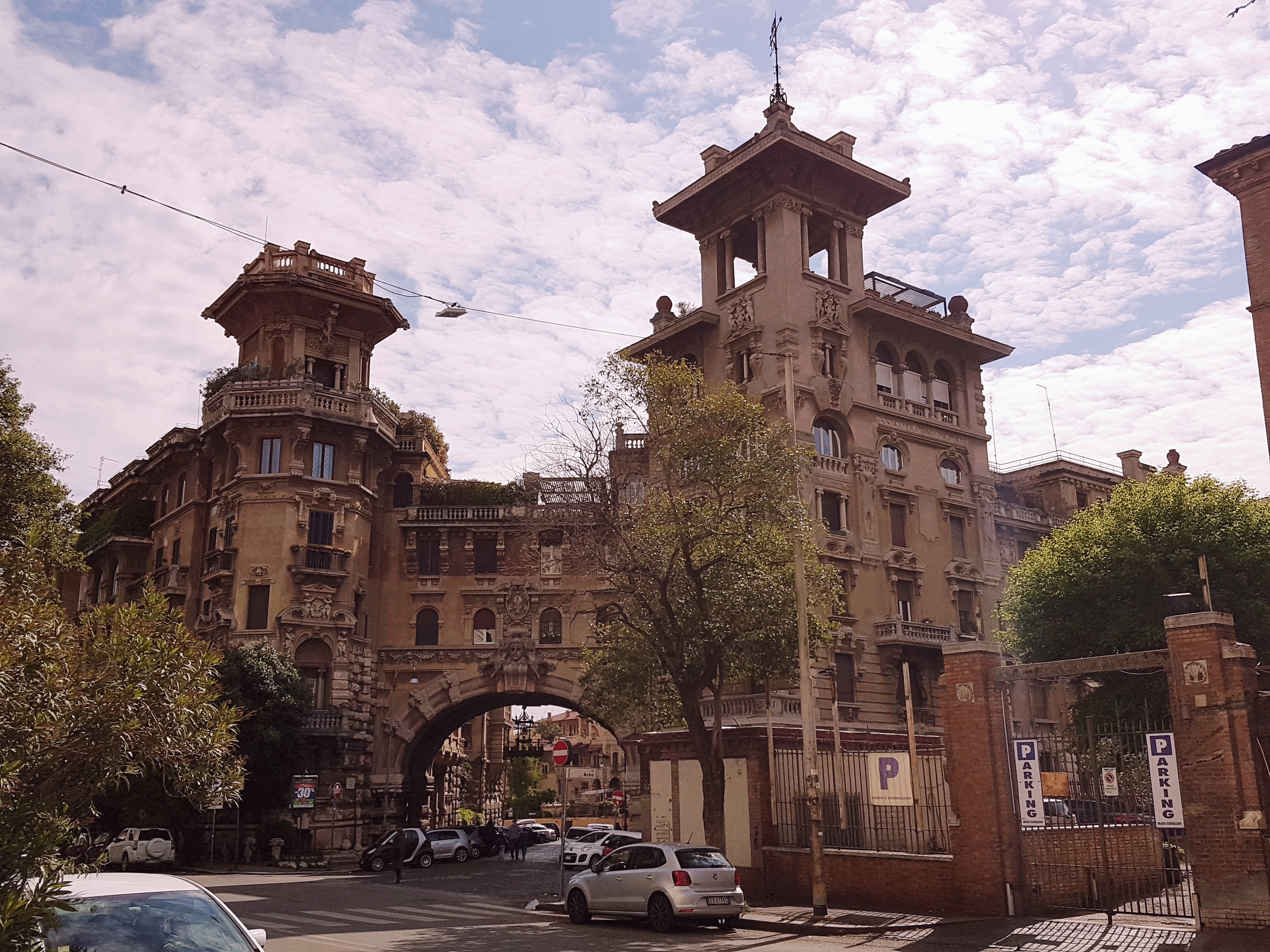
Coppedè district is part of Trieste

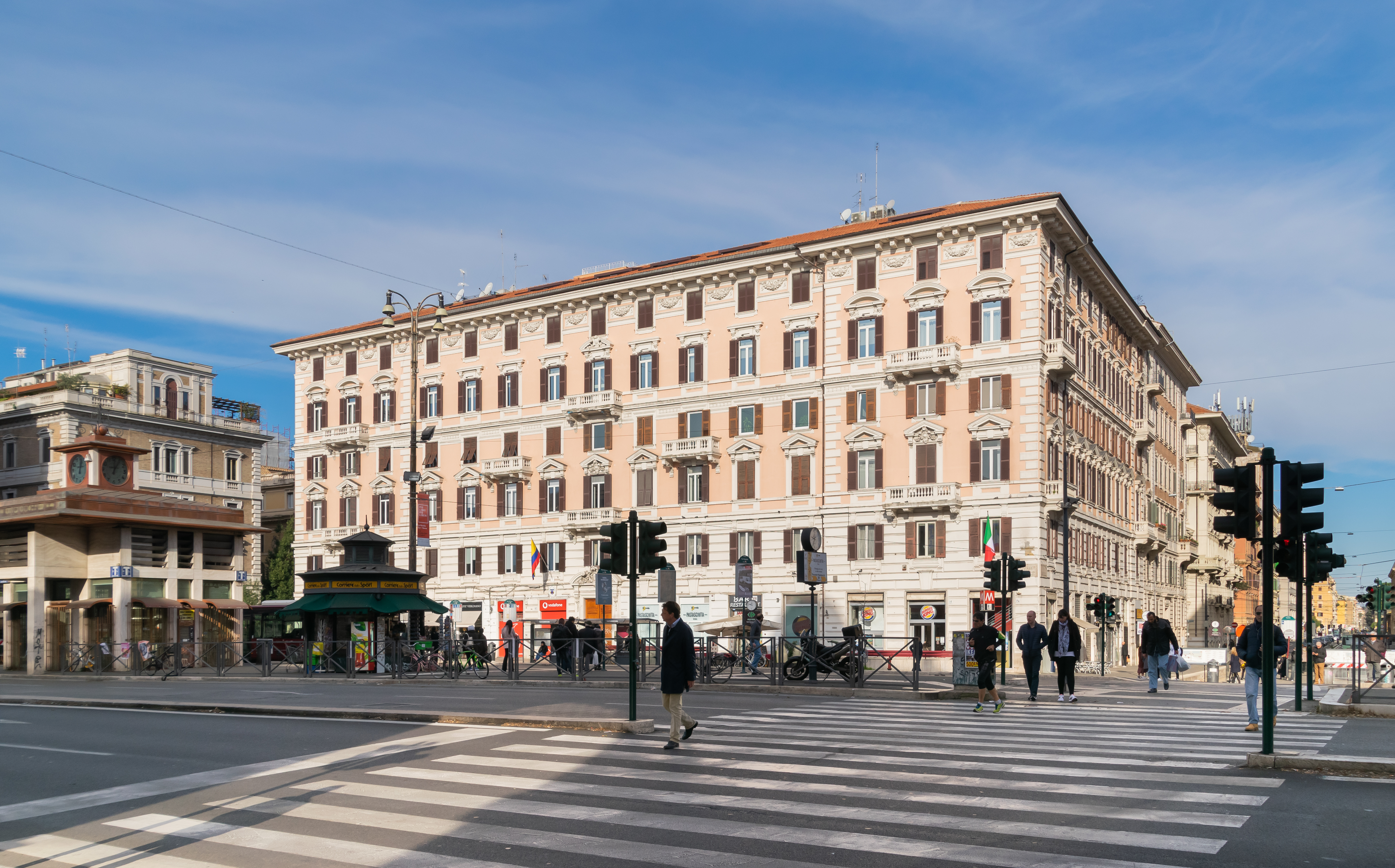
Piazzale Flaminio
