= Trieste (Rome) =

Q. XVII Trieste
- Quartiere of Rome
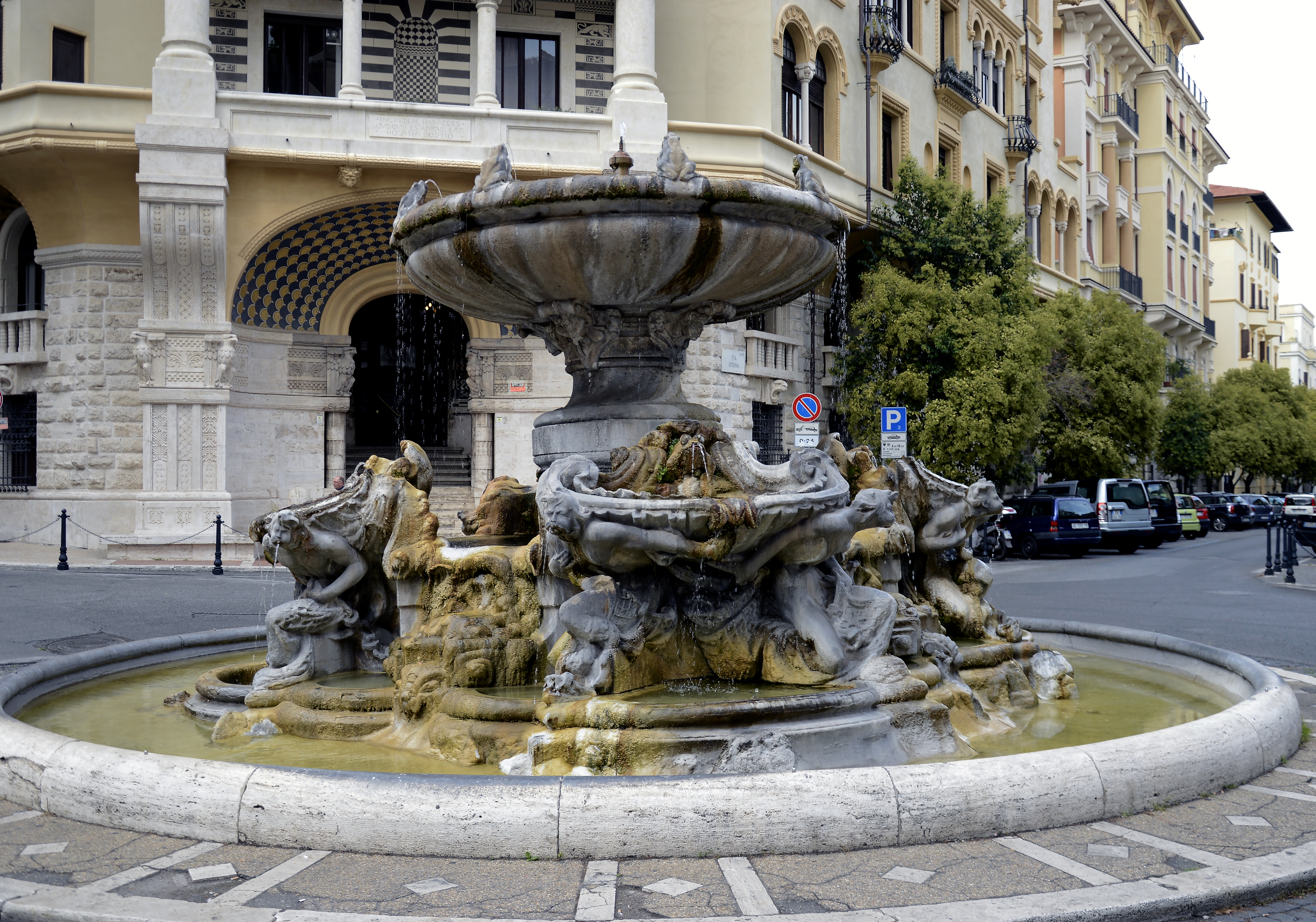
- Fontana delle Rane in the Quartiere Coppedè, Piazza Mincio

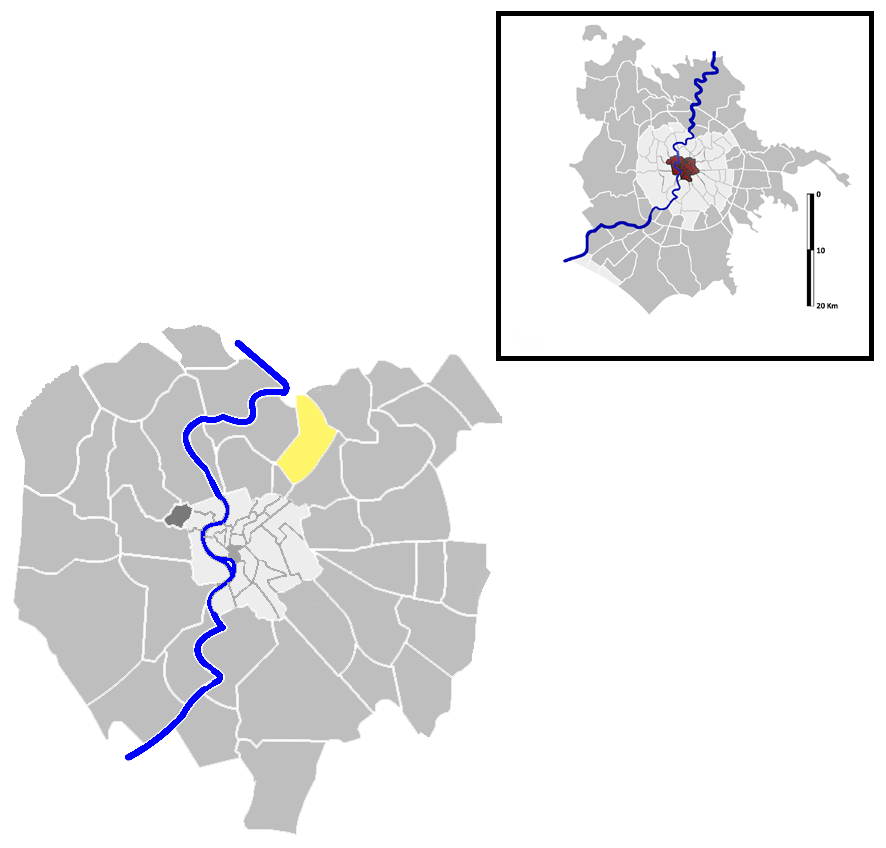
- Position of the quartiere within the city of Rome
- Country: Italy
- Region: Lazio
- Province: Rome
- Comune: Rome
- Municipio: Municipio Roma II
- Established: 24 May 1926

Area
  - Total: 1.4310 sq mi (3.7063 km^{2})

Population
  - Total: 62,142
  - Density: 43,420/sq mi (16,766/km^{2})
- Time zone: UTC+1 (CET)
  - Summer (DST): UTC+2 (CEST)

Trieste is the 17th quarter of Rome (Italy), identified by the initials Q. XVII.

The toponym also indicates the Urban Zone 2E of the Municipio II of Rome.

The eastern area of the quarter is known as the African Quarter, due to the presence of odonyms relating to the colonies of the Kingdom of Italy.

== Geography ==
The quarter is located in the north-central area of the city.

It borders:

- to the north, with the Zone Z. I Val Melaina, along the river Aniene in the stretch between the Ponte Salario and the bridge of the FL1 regional railway.
- to the north-east, with the quarter Q. XVI Monte Sacro, along the river Aniene in the stretch between the bridge of the FL1 regional railway and the bridge of Via delle Valli, then between the FL1 regional railway and Via Nomentana.
- to the south-east, with the quarter Q. V Nomentano, along Via Nomentana, the FL1 regional railway and Viale Regina Margherita.
- to the south-west, with the quarter Q. IV Salario, along Viale Regina Margherita in the stretch between Via Nomentana and Via Salaria.
- to the north-west, with the quarter Q. II Parioli, along Via Salaria in the stretch between Viale Regina Margherita and Ponte Salario.

== History ==
=== The territory before the urbanization ===
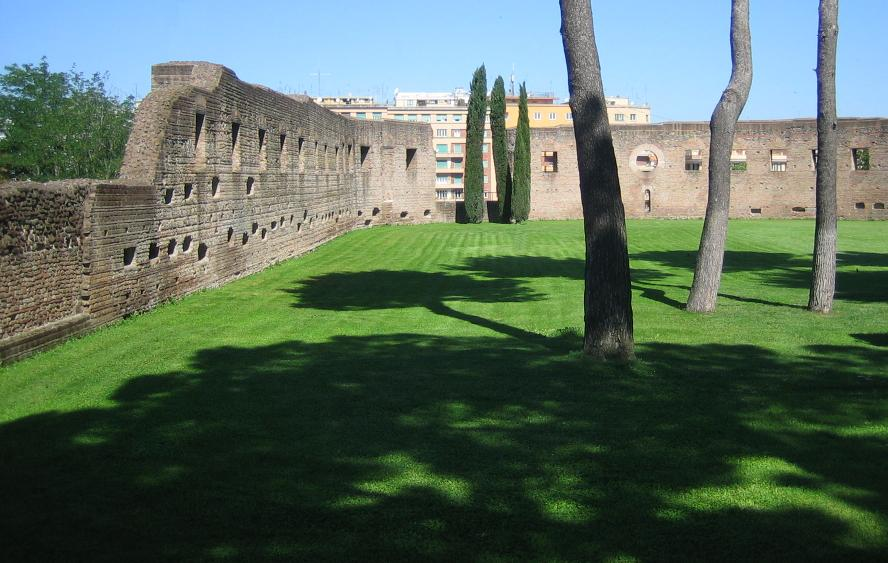
Ruins of the paleochristian basilica of St. Agnes.

The first evidence of human presence in the quarter dates back to prehistoric times, when some populations settled in the area of the so-called Sedia del Diavolo and of Monte delle Gioie. Later, in historical times, a Sabine settlement rose on the Mount Antenne, the remains of which are still visible today; according to the legend, Antemnae was one of the three villages that underwent the famous rape of the Sabine women. Just few remains survive from the archaic and republican ages, while the area became very popular following the construction of several catacombs, such as the ancient catacomb of Priscilla, built on the villa of the gens Acilia.

Furthermore, the area is crossed by a section of the Via Salaria, a consular road of enormous importance that connected Rome to Porto d'Ascoli, so called for the trade of salt (Latin: sal). Nonetheless, the modern road of the same name follows the route of the Salaria Nova, built under the Emperor Nerva.

In the years following the Edict of Milan (313 AD), a monumental basilica dedicated to St. Agnes, whose family villa rose in Via Nomentana, was built. Next to it, the empress Constantina had her mausoleum built in the second half of the century. Due to its large size, the basilica soon decayed, so as to induce Pope Honorius I (625–628) to commission the current Byzantine-style basilica (Sant'Agnese fuori le mura). Around these two monuments, during the Middle Ages and at the beginning of the Renaissance, the complex of the Canons Regular of the Lateran was built.

During the Renaissance and the following centuries, the area of the quarter housed only a few noble villas and rustic buildings (farmhouses); in one of these, on the Via Nomentana, Giuseppe Garibaldi lived at the time of the Roman Republic.

=== Urbanization and birth of the quarter ===
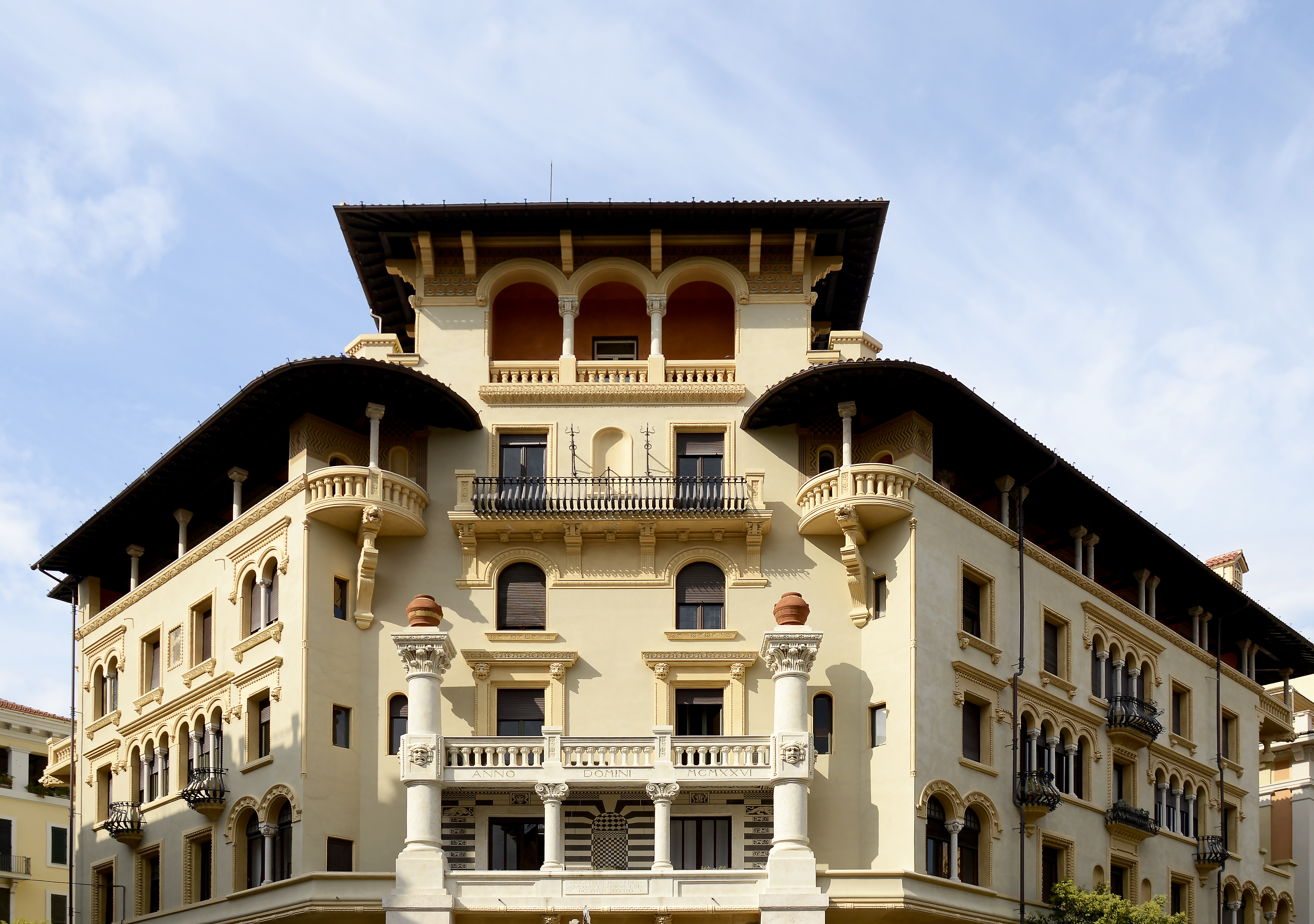
Palace in the Quartiere Coppedè.

Following the Italian unification, the area of Mount Antenne was fortified with large bastions, moats and with an imposing powder keg, since its position was particularly suitable for defending the northern side of the city. Its slopes house since 1906 the seat of the Parioli Tennis Club, still active today and famous for having raised numerous champions.

The first urbanization of the territory took place with the urban plan issued in 1909 by the architect Edmondo Sanjust di Teulada, but the quarter was officially born only in 1926 with the name Savoia, from the nearby royal residence (the present Villa Ada); the event is commemorated by a plaque today in Via Topino, near Piazza Verbano.

In the first thirty years of the century the area maintained its destination for quality, or even luxury, residential buildings: it is the period of the "villini" and the Quartiere Coppedè.

The intensive urbanization begins in the 1930s. Large, often pretentious condominiums were built on the areas of villas which had been parceled out for this purpose, such as Villa Lancellotti and Villa Chigi (of the latter, only a public park and a private residence survive): housing for civil servants or buildings granted to cooperatives (for example, the Cooperative of the railway workers occupied the area near Piazza Crati). Between 1924 and 1930, with the aim of providing a green lung to an intensively built neighborhood, the architect Raffaele De Vico built the Parco Virgiliano (or Parco Nemorense), which was inaugurated in 1936 on the occasion of the Virgilian bimillennium.

Following the birth of the Republic, in 1946 the quarter took on its current name from its main street.

In the 1970s the area was the subject of a new building speculation, which caused the demolition of Tor Fiorenza, a 16th-century fortified farm where anemic children were brought to drink the fresh milk.

The northern part of the quarter, from Piazza Annibaliano to the Rome-Florence railway, is commonly called African quarter, due to its odonomastic inspired by the African colonies of the Kingdom of Italy (Via Tigrè, Via Tripolitania, Via Gadames, Viale Libia; see below). The original nucleus of this "sub-quarter", originally intended for the families of the railway workers, was built in the early 1920s, forming a quadrilateral in the area adjacent to Via Tripoli. Within this quadrilateral, Via Tobruk, Via Derna, Via Cirenaica and Piazza Misurata were also marked out, as well as Via Benadir and Via Migiurtinia outside its perimeter. These streets were added to Via Asmara and Via Massaua, side streets of Via Nomentana, which had been created shortly before to connect Villa Anziani.

After World War II, the railway workers' quarter, which consisted of some forty buildings, was completely demolished. As evidence of its past presence, part of the road system remains – with the exception of Via Tobruk, Piazza Misurata and Via Derna, which have been deleted (the name "Derna" was later attributed to another street) – and well as some buildings, favoured villas and more popular palaces, on Via Beandir, Via Homs, Via Tripolitania, Via Cirenaica and Via Migiurtinia. In the old quarter Pietro Germi shot A Man of Straw in 1958, while all around, along the axis Viale Eritrea-Viale Libia, the African quarter was being created as it appears today. A school building, some edifices of the Italian State Railways, a parking lot and two residential buildings were built in place of the quarter of the railway workers.

=== Lesser history ===
- During World War II, a curious episode involved the quarter: it was said that on full moon nights, in the area of Piazza Vescovio, a werewolf terrified the inhabitants with frightening screams coming from some gardens: he was actually a mentally ill man, later identified and hospitalized in an asylum.
- The building in Via Chiana nr. 87 housed the first elevator ever built in Italy for a council house intended for civil servants, inaugurated by Benito Mussolini himself, who, during the official speech, seems to have missed out the phrase: «... so it will be much easier for you to reach the musters in time!»
- Partly removed is the incident involving the population in early June 1944, when the RSI soldiers spread the false and uncontrolled rumor, which could trigger a collective madness, that the fleeing German troops had undermined the whole quarter and that there would even be a load of unexploded ammunitions. A flow of people reached Villa Borghese, where many spent the night in the open air despite the official denials and the appeals by radio.
- During the years of the economic boom, the quarter became famous for the Piper Club, a celebrated public house, inaugurated on 17 February 1965 and linked to many personalities of that time: it hosted the debut of Patty Pravo and the performances of Pink Floyd, Nirvana and the Beatles, who, after the concert, dived in the Fontana delle Rane in Piazza Mincio with their clothes on. Over time it has become more known for the movida often resulting in vandalism than for the celebrities passing.
- The quarter was still the talk of the town during the years of lead, due to the numerous political killings that took place there; among others, that of the magistrate Vittorio Occorsio, assassinated in 1976, four years after that of the policeman Francesco Evangelista in front of the Liceo classico statale "Giulio Cesare".

In those same years, in the clashes between opposing political factions, two young right-wing militants of the organization Fronte della Gioventù (connected to the Italian Social Movement) also died: Francesco Cecchin, aged just seventeen, who died on 16 June 1979 following an attack near Piazza Vescovio, and Paolo Di Nella, who died on 9 February 1983, after falling into an irreversible coma due to a beatdown near Piazza Gondar.

- In the 1980s, the writer Ornella Angeloni set in the quarter her crime novel Caffè Ciamei, the story of a long chain of crimes over forty years.
- Among the public houses in the quarter is the Tortuga Café in Piazza Trasimeno, in front of the Giulio Cesare high school, opened in 1953 and mentioned in the song Compagno di scuola by Antonello Venditti.

== Monuments and places of interest ==
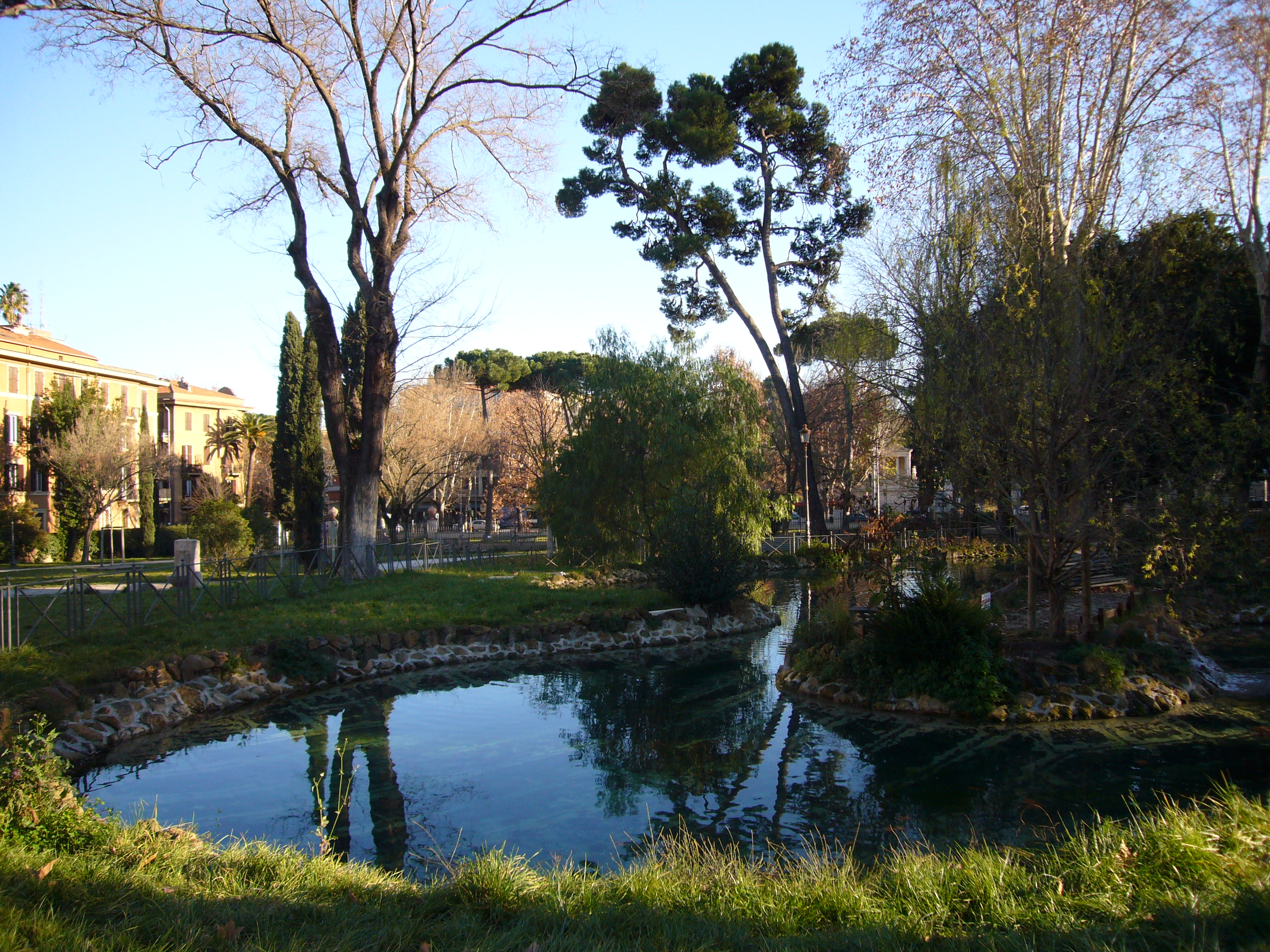
The gardens of Villa Paganini.

=== Civil buildings ===
==== Quartiere Coppedè ====
The Quartiere Coppedè is a small district built in Liberty-eclectic style. It is located in an area adjacent to Piazza Buenos Aires and was designed by architect Gino Coppedè. The gate of Piazza Mincio 2 dates to 1926 and was the last work by Coppedè. It is an exact replica of scenery used in the 1914 movie Cabiria.

==== Villa Albani ====
Villa Albani, also called Albani-Torlonia, which stretches between Via Salaria and Viale Regina Margherita, has been for 50 years the center of European culture, a compulsory stop for the most important travelers and the driving force of cultural phenomena such as Neoclassicism and Archaeology understood as History of Art. The villa was built in the mid-18th century by Cardinal Alessandro Albani – the nephew of Pope Clement XI, a refined connoisseur of antiquity and protector of artists, including Anton Raphael Mengs – to keep his collections of ancient art, chosen on the advice of Johann Joachim Winckelmann. Thus were born the "Laboratory of Neoclassicism", in which Piranesi also operated, and an "Art Gallery", for centuries inaccessible, which houses works by Niccolò da Foligno, Perugino, Gherardo delle Notti, Van Dyck, Tintoretto, Ribera, Guercino, Giulio Romano, Luca Giordano, David, Vanvitelli.

=== Religious buildings ===
- Sant'Agnese fuori le mura monumental complex, in via Nomentana
  - Basilica of Sant'Agnese fuori le mura
  - Mausoleum of Santa Costanza
- Santa Maria Addolorata a piazza Buenos Aires, in Piazza Buenos Aires
- San Giuda Taddeo, in Via Rovereto
- San Saturnino, in Piazza San Saturnino
- Chapel of Our Lady of the Sacred Rosary, in Via Lambro
- Santa Emerenziana, in Piazza Santa Emerenziana
- Sacri Cuori di Gesù e Maria a Tor Fiorenza, in Via Poggio Moiano
- Santa Maria Goretti, in Via di Santa Maria Goretti
- Santissima Trinità a Villa Chigi, in Viale Arrigo Boito

=== School buildings ===
- Liceo classico statale Giulio Cesare, in Corso Trieste

Built in 1935–36 by the architect Cesare Valle

- Liceo scientifico "Amedeo Avogadro", with the main seat in 26, Via Brenta (within the Quartiere Coppedè) and a branch in Via Cirenaica (within the Quartiere Africano)
- Istituto d'Istruzione Superiore "Giosuè Carducci", in Via Asmara
- Istituto Comprensivo Via Volsinio:
  - Secondary school "Esopo", in Via Volsinio
  - Primary school "Giuseppe Mazzini", in via Volsinio
  Built in 1930–31 by the architect Cesare Valle. The school was formerly entitled to Sandro Italico Mussolini, nephew of Benito Mussolini.
  - Primary and secondary school "Ugo Bartolomei", in via Santa Maria Goretti
- Istituto comprensivo "Luigi Settembrini", in Via Sebenico.
- Istituto comprensivo "Sinopoli – Ferrini":
  - Secondary school "Giuseppe Sinopoli", in Via Mascagni
  - Public primary school "Contardo Ferrini", in Largo di Villa Chigi

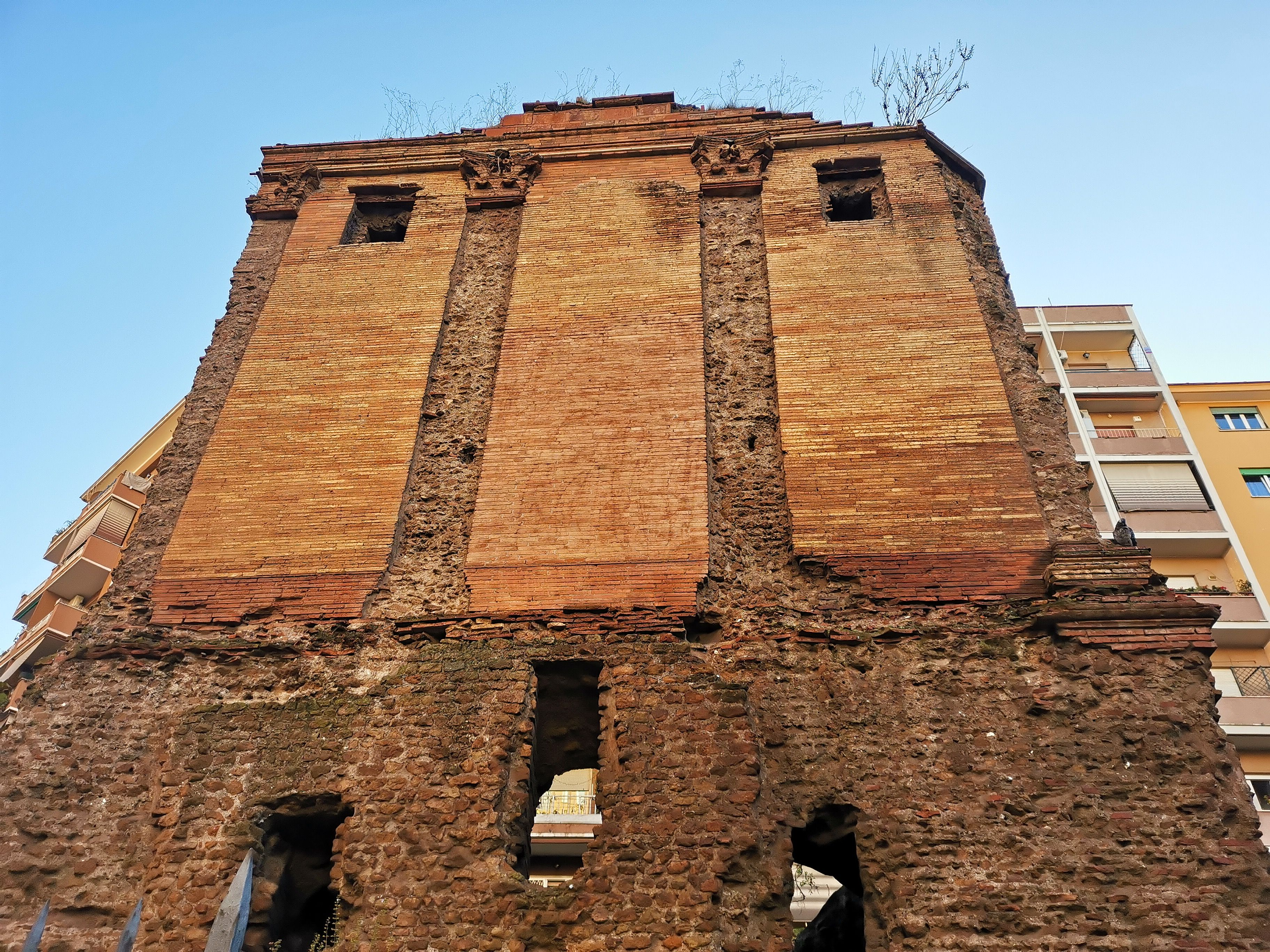
Sedia del Diavolo in Piazza Elio Callistio, Rome. Ancient Roman tomb of the second century CE

=== Archaeological sites ===
- Sedia del Diavolo, in Piazza Elio Callistio. Tomb of the second century AD

==== Catacombs ====
- Catacomb of Priscilla, in Via Salaria
- Catacombs of Saint Agnes, in Via Nomentana, under the basilica
- Catacomb of Traso, in Via Yser at the intersection with Via Salaria
- Catacombs of via Anapo, in Via Anapo at the intersection with via Salaria
- Large Catacomb

=== Green areas ===
- Parco Virgiliano (also called Parco Nemorense)
- Villa Chigi
- Villa Leopardi
- Villa Paganini

=== Bridges ===
- Ponte di via delle Valli
- Ponte Salario

== Cinema ==
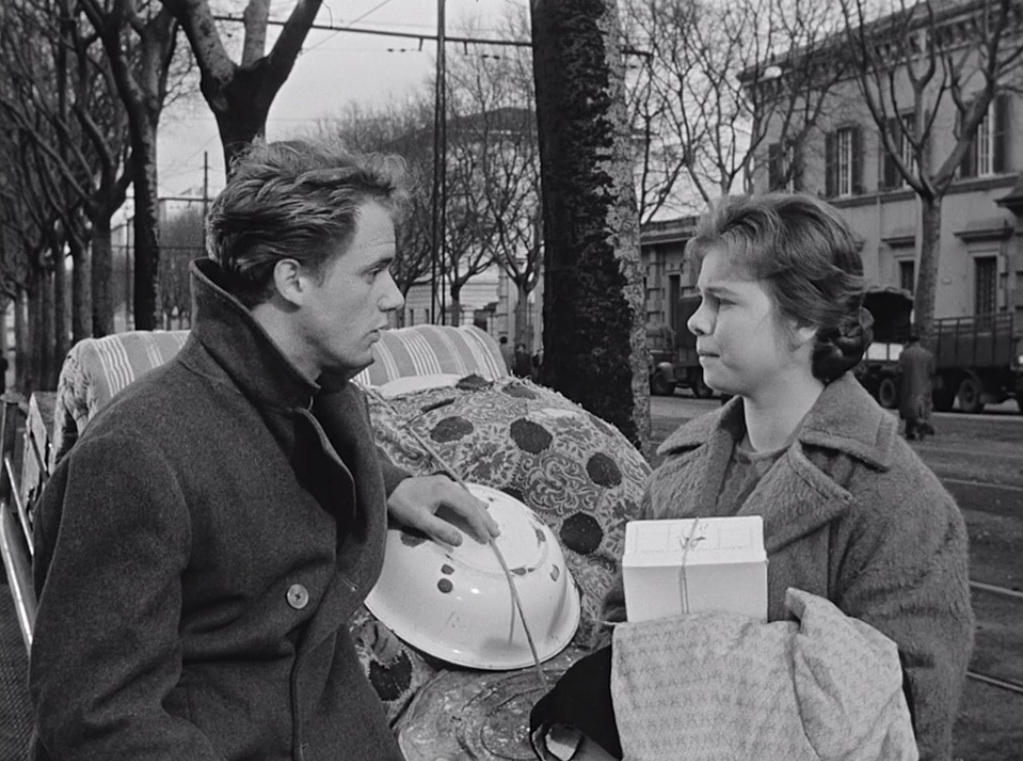
A screenshot from the movie The roof by Vittorio De Sica.

Over the years the quarter was often the setting for many Italian movies. De Sica used the shacks on the river Aniene as the set of the movie The roof in 1955.

Pietro Germi set his 1958 movie A Man of Straw among the buildings, later demolished, of the railway workers' quarter.

Also in the 1950s, the scene of the chase between Aldo Fabrizi and Totò in Cops and Robbers begins at the end of Viale Somalia and continues on a hill where the future Via Olimpica was built.

In 1953, the house of the protagonist of La valigia dei sogni by Luigi Comencini is located in the complex of the railway workers' buildings in Via Mancinelli

The quarter is also the location of the movie The Sign of Venus, with Alberto Sordi and Sophia Loren, which shows its aspect in the 1950s.

Some scenes from Big Deal on Madonna Street are set in the area. Carla Gravina meets her boyfriend in front of the barracks "Bianchi", right on the railway bridge: in the background you can see the first buildings on Viale Etiopia, while all around there is only countryside. In the opening scenes of the movie Audace colpo dei soliti ignoti (1960), Vittorio Gassman enters a door in Via Dora in the Quartiere Coppedè, while during the movie he walks along Viale Etiopia still under construction.

A brief shot in Be Sick... It's Free, with Alberto Sordi, shows Viale Libia near the UPIM department store. The same UPIM store in 1960 is the workplace of the three protagonists of Caccia al marito with Sandra Mondaini, while in We All Loved Each Other So Much by Ettore Scola, Piazza Caprera is used to mark a change of time. Scola himself 20 years later will set his Mario, Maria and Mario, with Giulio Scarpati, in the historic headquarters of the PCI in Via Sebino.

Due to its peculiar architecture, the Quartiere Coppedè was chosen by the director Dario Argento, residing in the quarter Trieste, as the background for some scenes of his movies The Bird with the Crystal Plumage (1970) and Inferno (1980).

Among all the sequences, one of the most moving images is the vision of a totally deserted Via Nomentana in the 1941 small masterpiece of De Sica Teresa Venerdì, set in the streets of the quarter.

In more recent times, the public high school "Giulio Cesare" has been the backdrop for the fiction Piper and the movie Scusa ma ti chiamo amore by Federico Moccia.

== Anthropic geography ==
=== Urban planning ===
The territory of the quarter coincides with the homonymous urban zone 2E and with the western part of the urban zone 2D Salario.

=== Odonyms ===
Italian lakes and rivers

One of the main streets of the quarter is Via Nemorense, which takes its name from the Lake Nemi. Many streets near it bear the name of important Italian lakes:

- Avigliana, Benaco (Lake Garda), Clisio (Lake Orta), Lariana (Lake Como), Ledro, Lago di Lesina, Levico, Lucrino, Massaciuccoli, Piediluco, Sabazio (Lake Bracciano), Sebino (Lake Iseo), Verbano (Lake Maggiore), Volsinio (Lake Bolsena).

Other streets bear the name of Italian rivers:

- Adige, Agri, Arno, Aterno, Bacchiglione, Bormida, Brenta, Chiani, Clitunno, Crati, Lambro, Mincio, Oglio, Ombrone, Panaro, Reno, Serchio, Tagliamento, Taro, Ticino, Tolero (river Sacco), Topino, Tronto.

Italian colonies in Africa

The part of the quarter commonly called "Quartiere Africano" is hinged on 4 avenues, bearing the names of the four Italian colonies in Africa, surrounded by streets named after cities and historical regions of the colonies themselves.

Eritrea

- Agordat, Asmara, Assab, Cheren, Dancalia, Massaua, Senafè.

Etiopia

- Addis Abeba, Adigrat, Adua, Amba Alagi, Dessiè, Dire Daua, Endertà, Galla e Sidama, Gimma, Gondar, Makallè, Ogaden, Scirè, Tembien, Tigrè.

Libya

- Barce, Bengasi, Cirenaica, Cirene, Derna, Fezzan, Gadames, Ghirza, Giarabub, Homs, Sabrata, Sirte, Tocra, Tripoli, Tripolitania.

Somalia

- Benadir, Chisimaio, Giuba, Migiurtinia, Mogadiscio.

Toponyms of the Sabina

Piazza Vescovio takes its name from the homonymous ancient locality in the municipality of Torri in Sabina, in the Province of Rieti. Although the correct accentuation is Vescovìo, there is a widespread tendency to pronounce the toponym as Vescòvio due to an incorrect phonetic interpretation. In the vicinity of the square, many streets recall toponyms of municipalities or valleys of the Sabina:

- Amatrice, Antrodoco, Casperia, Collalto Sabino, Forano, Magliano Sabina, Orvinio, Poggio Catino, Poggio Moiano, Poggio San Lorenzo, Roccantica, Rocca Sinibalda, Scandriglia, Valnerina.

Italian irredentism

Several streets are dedicated to geographic areas inhabited, in whole or in part, currently or in the past, by Italians, but which have never politically joined (or are no longer included in) the Italian state (and therefore considered by some to be "irredent Italy"); or, on the contrary, which have passed to the Kingdom of Italy after the victory over the Austro-Hungarian Empire in the World War I (1918):

- Bolzano, Corsica, Dalmazia, Gorizia, Gradisca, Istria, Trento, Trieste.

Italian opera composers and madrigalists

In the vicinity of Viale Somalia there is a group of streets whose names are a tribute to Italian opera composers – Arrigo Boito, Niccolò Piccinni, Pietro Mascagni, Alessandro Vessella – or madrigalists – Felice Anerio.

References to the monuments in the quarter

Piazza Annibaliano takes its name from the husband of the empress Constantina, whose mausoleum stands a few meters away.

Via di Priscilla and Via di Novella are located near the Catacomb of Priscilla.

The square surrounding the so-called Sedia del Diavolo bears the name of Elius Callistius, the freedman of Hadrian to whom the sepulchral monument was erected.

== Sport ==
- Somalia Sport Club: since the 1970s, the quarter Trieste houses one of the most well-known sports facilities in the capital, the Somalia Sport Club in Largo Somalia nr. 60 (former American Health Club and later Roman Sport Center), a real institution in the field of indoor sports and recreational activities, in which important celebrities and politics, among others, have trained for years.

In 2014 it was the scene of a scandal related to the bankruptcy of the company that managed it, which caused its impromptu closure. Following this event, the facility remained closed for over a year, until it was reopened by a new company in late 2015. Today the facility has returned to its former grace with the name of Somalia Sport Club and represents a point of reference for indoor sport throughout the northern quadrant of the town.

== Bibliography ==
- Giorgio Carpaneto; others (1997). I quartieri di Roma. Rome: Newton Compton Editori.
- Giorgio Carpaneto (1991). "QUARTIERE XVII. TRIESTE". I Rioni e i Quartieri di Roma. Vol. 7. Rome: Newton Compton Editori.
- Claudio Rendina; Donatella Paradisi (2004). Le strade di Roma. Vol. 1. Rome: Newton Compton Editori.
- Claudio Rendina (2006). I quartieri di Roma. Vol. 1. Rome: Newton Compton Editori.
