= Monte Sacro (quarter) =

- Quartiere of Rome
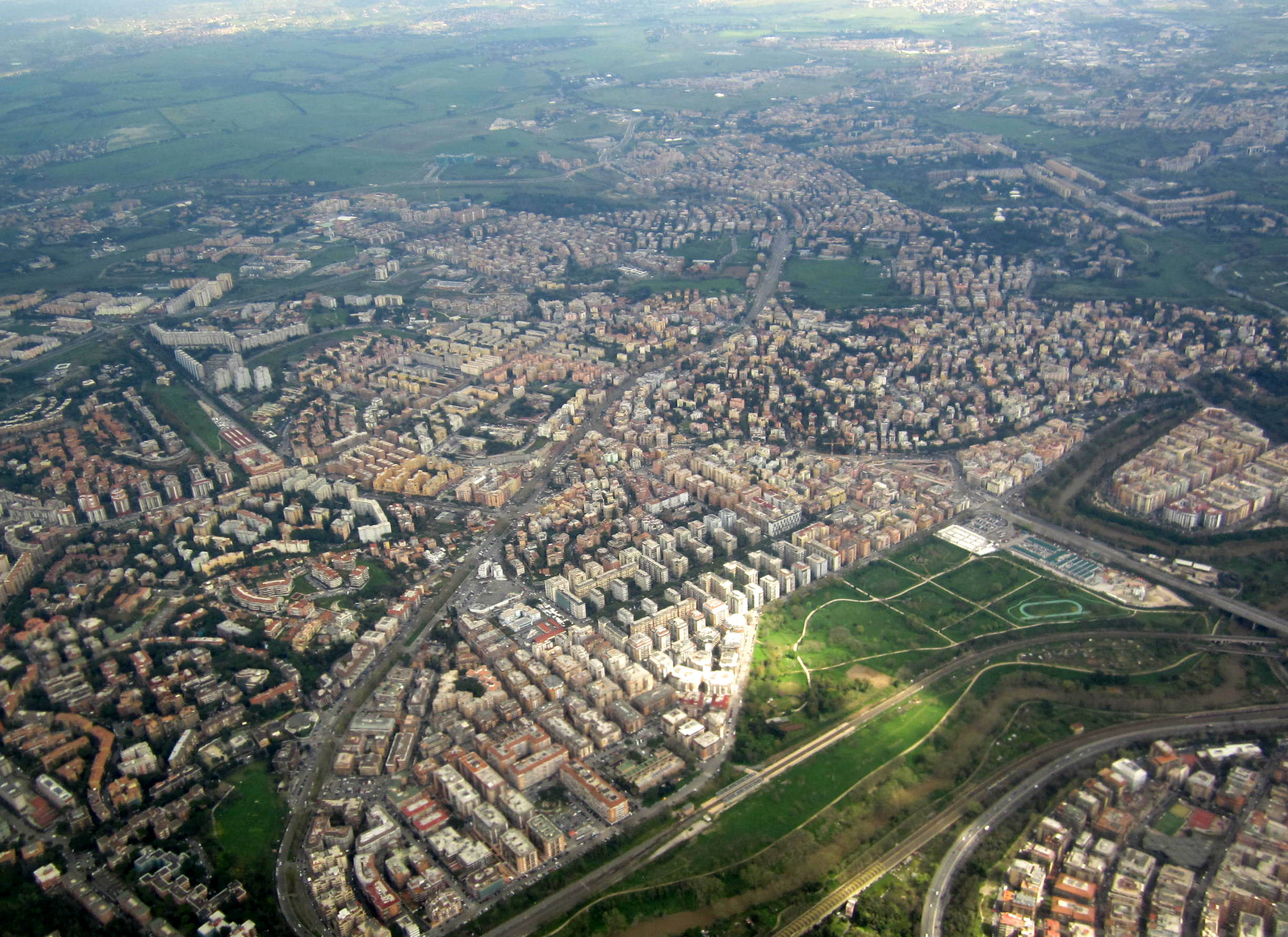

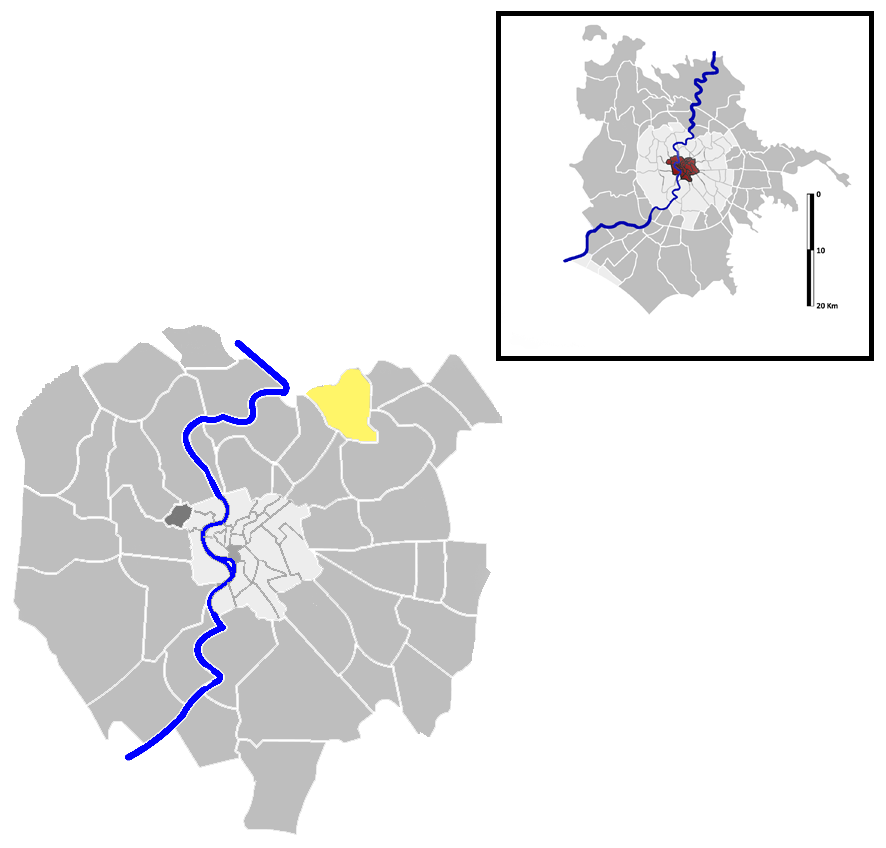
- Position of the quartiere within the city
- Country: Italy
- Region: Lazio
- Province: Rome
- Comune: Rome

Area
  - Total: 0.64 sq mi (1.67 km^{2})

Population (2016)
  - Total: 16,579
  - Density: 25,712.2/sq mi (9,927.54/km^{2})
- Time zone: UTC+1 (CET)
  - Summer (DST): UTC+2 (CEST)

Monte Sacro is the 16th quartiere of the city of Rome in Italy. As a quarter, or second level administrative division, it is one of two that comprise the first level division of Municipio III.

Monte Sacro takes its name from the namesake Monte Sacro hill.

== History ==
Following the fall of the Roman Empire, the area became significantly depopulated, and ancient patrician villas were later replaced by medieval farmsteads. However, the zone was constantly controlled, as the Ponte Nomentano bridge was a relevant outpost and an important crossing point toward the northern Latium. Traditionally, Ponte Nomentano is considered the place where Pope Leo III met Charlemagne in 800.

Because of the distance from the city, the territory became a place for jaunts and trips to the countryside, up to the beginning of the 19th century. According to the tradition, it was during a trip in Monte Sacro countryside in 1805 that Simon Bolivar took the oath to free the Latin American people, after his mentor and friend Simon Rodriguez told him that the Roman plebs made camp on the Mons Sacer following its secession from the city.

Construction started in the area in the 1920s, when architect Gustavo Giovannoni planned and built a new borough, inspired by the principles of the Garden city movement. Piazza Sempione is the spectacular entry to the quarter, surrounded by the edifices that were planned by Giovannoni himself and by Innocenzo Sabbatini. The quarter was called Città Giardino Aniene, and was officially renamed Monte Sacro in 1924.

The commitment of the locals to the Resistenza during the Nazi occupation has been very remarkable, and two residents of Monte Sacro, the partisans Ferdinando Agnini and Orlando Orlandi Posti, were killed in the Ardeatine massacre. The whole neighborhood, particularly Piazza Sempione and Viale Jonio, is the setting of Beppe Fenoglio's novel Primavera di bellezza, set in the resistance years.

The "garden city" endured for just 30 years, since in the 1950s residential buildings took the place of cottages and detached houses. Further expansions took place in the 1960s, in the areas of Tufello and Conca d'Oro, while in the second half of the 1960s, in the area of Talenti, the new quarter of Monte Sacro Alto took shape.

== Geography ==
The territory of the quarter includes the urban zones 4A Monte Sacro, 4G Conca d'Oro, 4H Sacco Pastore and 4I Tufello.

=== Boundaries ===
Northward, Monte Sacro borders with Zona I Val Melaina, whose boundary is marked by Via dei Prati Fiscali, Piazzale Jonio, Via di Valle Melaina, Via Monte Massico and Via Monte Resegone. To the north, Monte Sacro also borders with Zona IV Casal Boccone, the border being outlined by Via delle Vigne Nuove, Via Guadagnolo, Via Monte Fumaiolo and Via della Bufalotta.

Eastward, the quarter borders with Quartiere XXVIII Monte Sacro Alto: the border is marked by Via della Cecchina, Viale Jonio, by a stretch in the countryside and by Via Jacopo Sannazaro. To the east, Monte Sacro also borders with Quartiere XXIX Ponte Mammolo, whose boundary runs in the countryside from Via Nomentana up to the river Aniene.

Southward, Monte Sacro borders with Quartiere XXI Pietralata, whose border is outlined by the river Aniene up to Circonvallazione Nomentana; then it shares a short border with Quartiere V Nomentano, marked by a portion of Circonvallazione Nomentana, up to Via Nomentana.

To the south-west, the quarter borders also with Q. XVII Trieste, whose boundary is marked by Circonvallazione Salaria and then runs along the river Aniene, up to the bridge of the FL1 regional railway.

=== Odonymy ===
The odonymy of the area chiefly revolves around Italian topography, with streets and squares named after Italian mountains, islands and other geographical elements:

- islands, e.g. Largo Arbe, Piazza Brioni, Via Capraia, Piazza Capri, Via delle Egadi, Via Gorgona, Via Isole Pelagie, Via Lampedusa, Via Lipari, Viale Pantelleria, Via Pelagosa, Via Polvese, Via Ponza, Via Sant'Antioco, Via Scarpanto, Via Veglia, Via Ustica, Via Ventotene;
- mountains, e.g. Via Adamello, Via delle Alpi Apuane, Via delle Dolomiti, Piazza degli Euganei, Via Gargano, Viale Gottardo, Via Maiella, Piazza Monte Baldo, Via Monte Bianco, Via Monte Nevoso, Via Monte Rosa, Piazza Rocciamelone, Corso and Piazza Sempione, Via and Piazza Vettore, Piazza Vulture; Via Moncenisio, Via Gennargentu
- seas, e.g. Viale Adriatico, Viale and Piazza Carnaro, Piazzale and Viale Jonio, Viale Tirreno;
- valleys, e.g. Piazza and Via Conca d'Oro, Via Mugello, Via Val d'Aosta, Via Val d'Ossola, Via Val di Lanzo, Viale Val Padana, Via Val Seriana, Via Valdinievole, Via Valsesia, Via Valsugana
- volcanoes, e.g. Via Etna, Via and Piazza Vesuvio.

Some odonyms refer to the secession of the plebs of 494 BC, when the plebeians seceded and departed to the Mons Sacer, e.g. Piazza Menenio Agrippa and Parco Caio Sicinio Belluto.

== Places of interest ==
=== Palaces and other buildings ===
- Casa GIL, in Viale Adriatico.

=== Churches ===
- Santi Angeli Custodi a Città Giardino
- Santissimo Redentore a Valmelaina
- Santa Gemma Galgani a Monte Sacro

=== Other ===
- Ponte Nomentano

== Transports ==
Monte Sacro is served by the Line B1 of the Rome Metro (Conca d'Oro and Jonio stations).

The borough is also served by the Roma Nomentana railway station, located along the FL1 regional railway.
