= Val Melaina =

- Zona of Rome
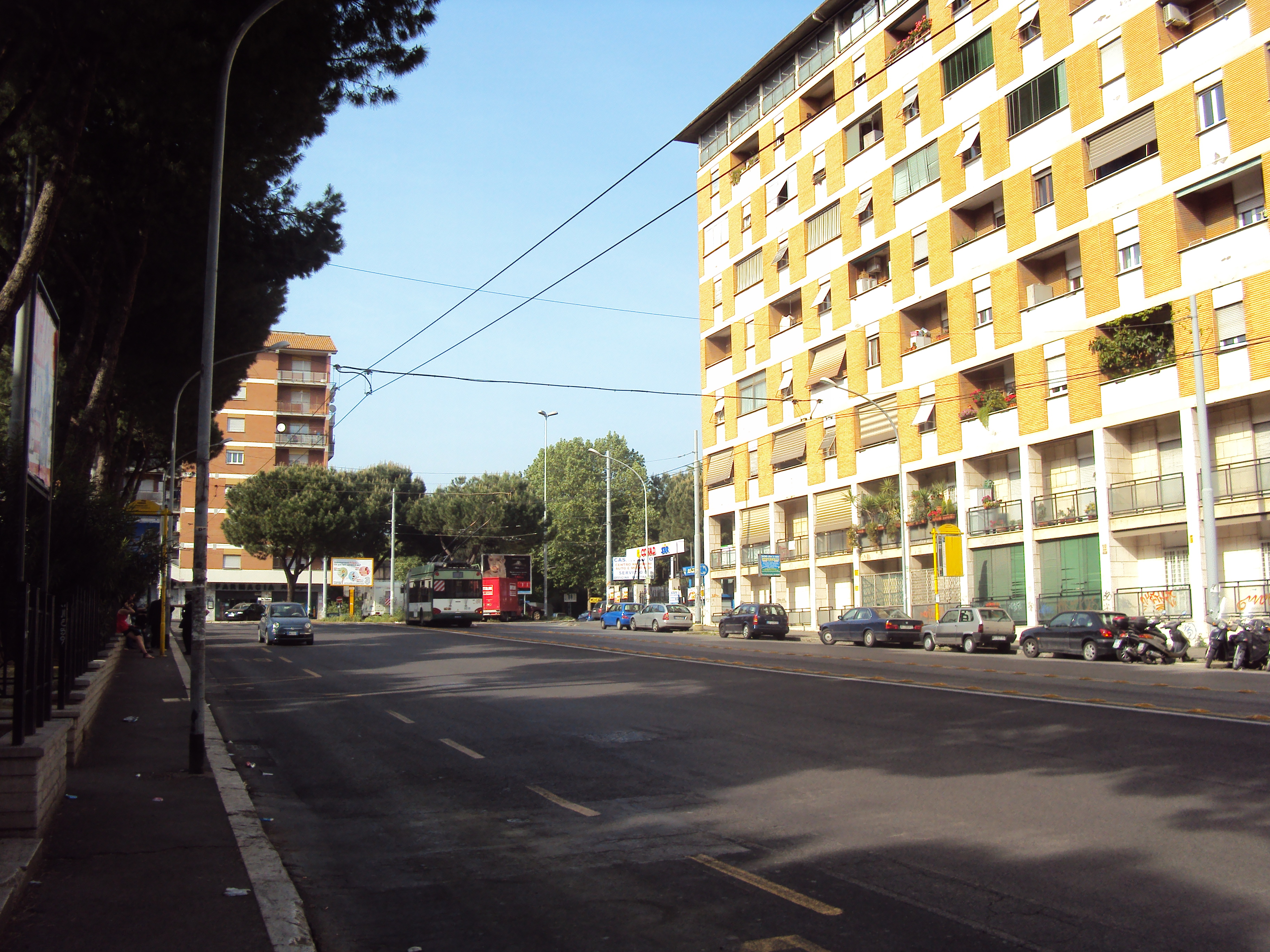
- Piazza Ottaviano Vimercati.

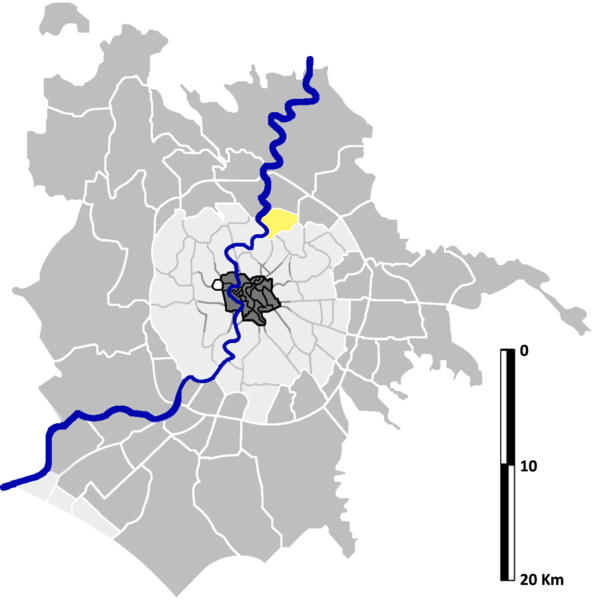
- Position of the zona within the city
- Country: Italy
- Region: Lazio
- Province: Rome
- Comune: Rome

Area
  - Total: 2.4111 sq mi (6.2447 km^{2})

Population (2016)
  - Total: 35,073
  - Density: 14,546.5/sq mi (5,616.44/km^{2})
- Time zone: UTC+1 (CET)
  - Summer (DST): UTC+2 (CEST)

Val Melaina is the 1st zona of Rome, identified by the initials Z. I, lying north of the city centre and covering an area of 6.2447 km².

The classic 1948 film Bicycle Thieves and Luigi Zampa's Il medico della mutua (1968) were shot in Val Melaina.

== Geography ==
Val Melaina is in the northern part of the city, inside the Grande Raccordo Anulare. The boroughs of Nuovo Salario and Prati Fiscali are located within this zone.

The territory of Val Melaina includes the major part of the urban zone 4B Val Melaina, a little part of the urban zone 4E Serpentara and the southern part of the urban zone 4L Aeroporto dell'Urbe.

=== Boundaries ===
Northward, the zona borders with Castel Giubileo (Z. II), from which is separated by the countryside, between the river Tiber and Via Pian di Scò, by Via Pian di Scò itself, then by Via Gaetano Martino, Via Giacomo Brodolini and Viadotto Antonio Segni.

To the east, Val Melaina borders with Casal Boccone (Z. IV), whose boundary is marked by the stretch of Via delle Vigne Nuove between Viadotto Antonio Segni and Via Monte Resegone. To the south-east, it borders with Quartiere Monte Sacro (Q. XVI), from which is separated by Via Monte Resegone, Via Monte Massico, Via di Valle Melaina, Piazzale Jonio and Via dei Prati Fiscali up to Ponte Salario.

Southward, Val Melaina shares a border with Quartiere Parioli (Q. II), which is outlined by the stretch of the river Aniene, between Ponte Salario and the Tiber.

Westward, the zona borders with Quartiere Tor di Quinto (Q. XVIII) and with Zona Grottarossa (Z. LVI): the boundary is marked by the river Tiber.

=== Odonymy ===
Streets and squares of Val Melaina are chiefly named after Italian politicians and, particularly in the borough of Nuovo Salario, after towns in Tuscany. Odonyms of Val Melaina can be categorized as follows:

- Actors, e.g. Via Antonio De Curtis, Via Dina Galli, Via Gilberto Govi, Via Rodolfo Valentino;
- Local toponyms, e.g. Piazza dell'Ateneo Salesiano, Via dei Prati Fiscali, Via di Prato Rotondo, Via di Valle Melaina, Via della Serpentara;
- Mountains, e.g. Via Monte Amiata, Via Monte Artemisio, Via Monte Cavo, Via Monte Cervialto, Via Monte Resegone;
- Politicians, e.g. Piazza Bortolo Belotti, Via Ivanoe Bonomi, Via Giacomo Brodolini, Via Gabrio Casati, Via Francesco Cocco-Ortu, Via Giovanni Conti, Via Ugo Della Seta, Piazza Antonio Fradeletto, Via Ottorino Gentiloni, Via Filippo Antonio Gualterio, Via Ubaldino Peruzzi, Piazza Luigi Porro Lambertenghi, Via Giuseppe Prina, Viadotto Antonio Segni, Piazza Ottaviano Vimercati, Via Gaetano Zirardini;
- Towns in Tuscany, e.g. Via Cavriglia, Via Chiusi, Piazza Civitella Paganico, Via Comano, Piazza Filattiera, Largo Marliana, Piazza Minucciano, Via Pian di Scò, Via Pienza, Via Podenzana, Via Sarteano, Via Seggiano, Via Suvereto, Via Uzzano, Piazza Vinci, Via Vaglia.

== Places of interest ==
=== Civil buildings ===
- Istituto Poligrafico e Zecca dello Stato, in Via Salaria
- Torre dello Scaricatore or Torre Salaria, in Via Salaria. 41.941376°N 12.507479°E
- Casale dello Scaricatore, in Via Salaria, a 17th-century farmstead. 41.941314°N 12.507573°E

=== Religious buildings ===
- San Frumenzio ai Prati Fiscali, in Via Cavriglia
- Santa Maria della Speranza, in Piazza Antonio Fradeletto
- Sant'Ugo, in Viale Lina Cavalieri

=== Archaeological sites ===
- Ponte Salario, crossing the river Aniene
- Villa di Val Melaina, in Via delle Vigne Nuove, a Roman domus dating back to 1st century BC. 41.957457°N 12.536469°E
- Ipogeo della Torricella, in Via della Serpentara, a hydraulic artifact dating back to the 1st century BC. 41.957621°N 12.511233°E
- Sepulchre of Marius, in Via Salaria, dating back to the imperial age 41.941376°N 12.507479°E
- Roman cistern, in Via Gaetano Zirardini, dating back to the imperial age. 41.962266°N 12.520846°E

=== Natural areas ===
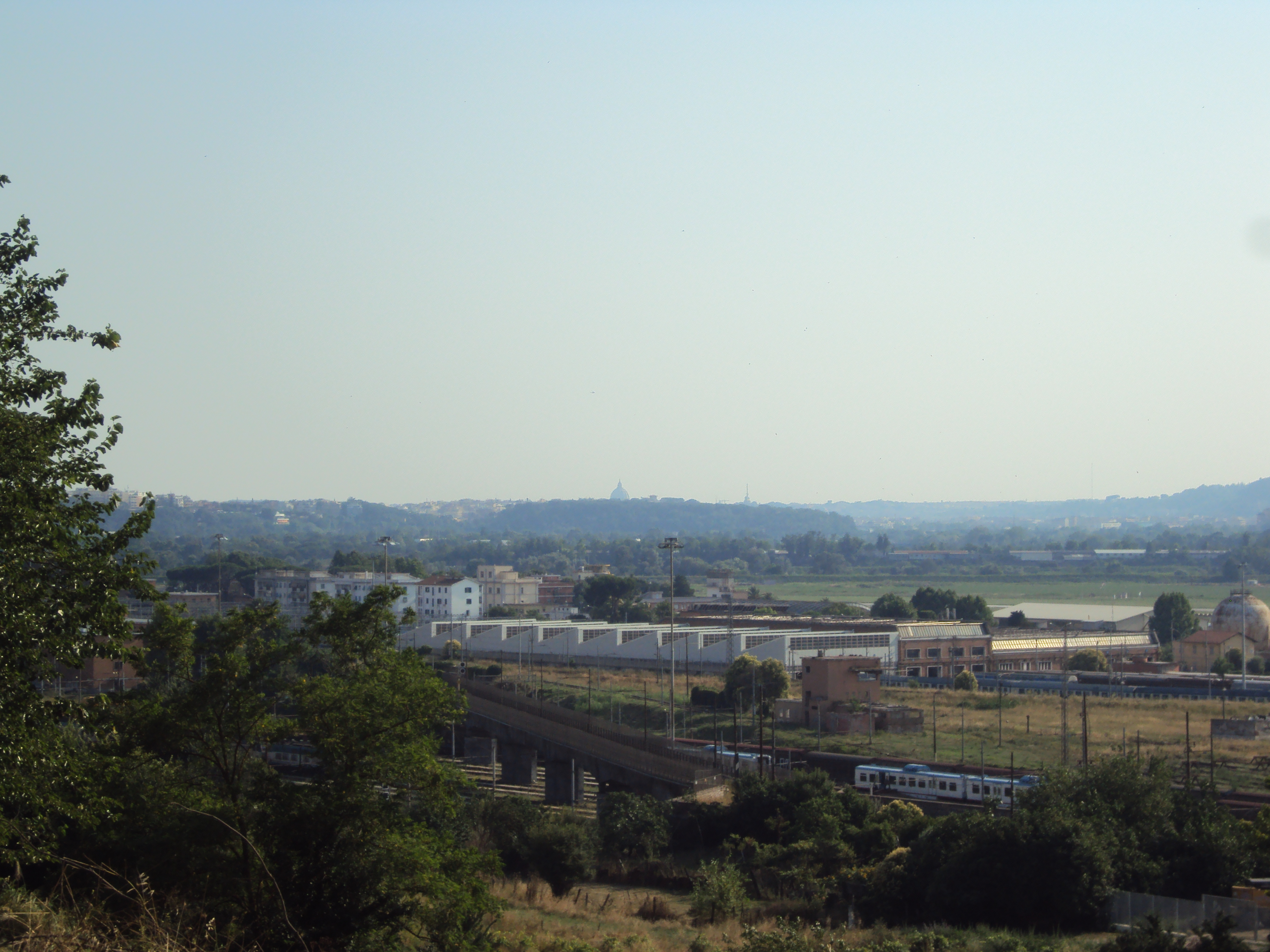
The Saint Peter's Dome seen from the Parco della Torricella

- Riserva naturale Valle dell'Aniene, alongside the Aniene. 41.941306°N 12.502700°E
- Parco della Torricella, in Via della Serpentara. 41.958869°N 12.511946°E
- Parco Chiala, in Via Luigi Chiala. 41.954927°N 12.521659°E
- Parco Thomas Sankara, in Via Ugo Della Seta.

=== Education ===
- Salesian Pontifical University, in Piazza dell'Ateneo Salesiano
