= Catacombs of Saint Agnes =

Catacomb in Rome, Italy

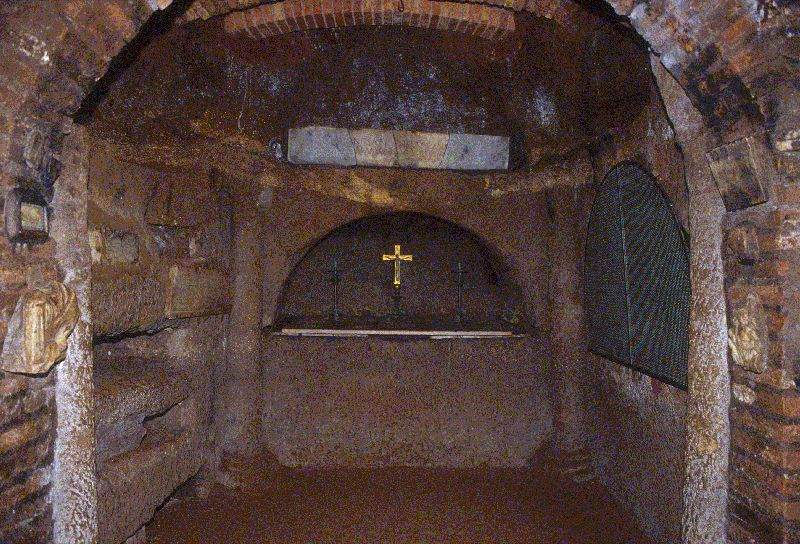
The Catacombs of Saint Agnes

The Catacomb of Saint Agnes (Italian: Catacombe di Sant'Agnese) is one of the catacombs of Rome, placed at the second mile of via Nomentana, inside the monumental complex of Sant'Agnese fuori le mura, in the Quartiere Trieste.

== Toponym ==
The name of the catacomb derives from the virgin and martyr Saint Agnes, the only martyr buried in this catacomb that is mentioned in the ancient documents. The date of her martyrdom is uncertain, but it can be referred to one of the persecutions against Christians of the 3rd century and in particular the ones ordered by Decius (249–251), Valerian (257–260) or Diocletian (303–305), the later supposedly taking place in the beginning of the 4th century.

The most ancient literary testimony is the Depositio martyrum (first half of 4th century): it tells that her dies natalis (i.e. the day of her 'birth' into heaven) is January 21 and that she was buried in the graveyard on Via Nomentana, that the Depositio dedicates to her. This information is confirmed by the poem of Pope Damasus I (366–384), engraved on a marble plate by his dal suo calligraphist Furius Dionisius Filocalus: this plate, reused as a paving stone and casually discovered, is now placed into the narthex of the basilica di Sant'Agnese fuori le mura. Other eminent testimonies about the life of martyr Agnes are given by the writings of some Church Fathers: De virginibus and the hymn Agnes beatae virginis by Saint Ambrose, and the Liber Peristephanon by Prudentius. The “Passio sanctae Agnetis”, that blends the previous testimonies with doxologic and hagiographic purposes, was written in the 5th century.

== History ==
Agnes was buried in a preexisting hypogeum cemetery, that – according to ancient sources – was owned by the family of the martyr and located close to an imperial property. The epigraphic sources and the kind of sepulture allow to gather that the cemetery dates back the second half of 3rd century and corresponds to the first region of the whole subterranean complex. Above this catacomb was built an aedicule in memory of the saint under the papacy of Pope Liberius (352–366); Pope Symmachus (498–514) transformed it into a little basilica, which finally was completely reconstructed into the present basilica by Pope Honorius I in the first half of the 7th century: the building of Honorius basilica entailed the destruction of part of the underlying catacomb.

During the 4th century, the original burial nucleus was enlarged, thus giving rise to the other three regions. In particular, the subdial ground above the fourth region was expropriated by emperor Constantine, who built the first basilica dedicated to the martyr Agnes (now in ruin) and the mausoleum of Santa Costanza, where the daughters of the emperor – Constantina and Helena – were later buried. Excavations carried out in the 1970s have shown that the ground above the fourth region was occupied by a pagan necropolis dating back to the half of 2nd century, that was destroyed during the construction of Constantine's basilica: the same happened on the Vatican Hill, when, in order to build the Old St. Peter's Basilica, the emperor Constantine ordered the destruction and the landfill of the former necropolis.

The whole catacomb complex was then abandoned and forgotten. It was rediscovered and explored at the beginning of 16th century by a Dominican friar, Onofrio Panvinio. It was later studied by Antonio Bosio in its Roma sotterranea ("Subterranean Rome"; 1632), although the author mixed it up with the nearby Coemeterium maius ("Greater Catacomb"). During the 18th century the Catacomb of St. Agnes and, in particular, the second region, was seriously damaged by diggers in search of relics and treasures. On behalf of Giovanni Battista de Rossi, in the second half of 19th century Mariano Armellini made a series of excavations into the hypogeum cemetery, recovering some parts in good preservation status. At the beginning of the 20th century, the priest Augusto Bacci, on behalf of the titular cardinal of the basilica, carried out some excavations, which were fundamental for the historical and topographic restoration of the memory of St. Agnes and the first region. Finally in the years 1971–1972, the priest Umberto Maria Fasola studied the fourth region, reaching the above-mentioned conclusions.

== Topography and description ==
The Catacomb of St. Agnes rises on three levels and is divided into four regions. It has no significant painting, but is rich in epigraphic testimonies.

- Regio I is the most ancient one, dating back to the 3rd century, in the pre-Constantinian epoch. It is placed under the present Via di Sant’Agnese, on the left of the basilica.
- Regio II grew starting from the 4th century and suffered, more than the other regions, the griefs of the diggers.
- Regio III also dates back to the 4th century, and is the widest of the entire hypogeum complex. It extends principally under the monastery pertaining to the basilica and Via Nomentana; in the past it was linked to the close by Coemeterium maius. Armellini, who was the first to excavate the region, found it substantially intact, buried under a layer of silt that preserved it from the diggers: many of the objects found in this region are now kept into the Vatican Museums.
- Regio IV is placed between the present basilica and the ruins of Constantine's basilica costantiniana; it grew up after emperor Constantine built his basilica destroying the pagan necropolis above the catacomb. Many plates with inscriptions, coming from the pagan cemetery, were used to build the steps giving access to the fourth region and so they have been preserved until now. This region contains the most ancient dated inscription of the whole catacomb: it dates back to 314 and is the epitaph of a man named Sisinnius.

== Bibliography ==
- De Santis L. – Biamonte G., Le catacombe di Roma, Newton & Compton Editori, Roma 1997, pp. 197–206
- Armellini M., Il cimitero di S. Agnese sulla via Nomentana, Roma 1880
- Bacci A., Scavi nella basilica di S. Agnese sulla via Nomentana, in Nuovo Bollettino di Archeologia Cristiana 7 (1901) 297–300
- Fasola U. M., La « regio IV » del cimitero di S. Agnese sotto l’atrio della basilica costantiniana, in Rivista di Archeologia Cristiana 50 (1974) 175–205
- Frutaz A. P., Il complesso monumentale di Sant'Agnese, Roma 1992
