= Ponte di San Francesco =

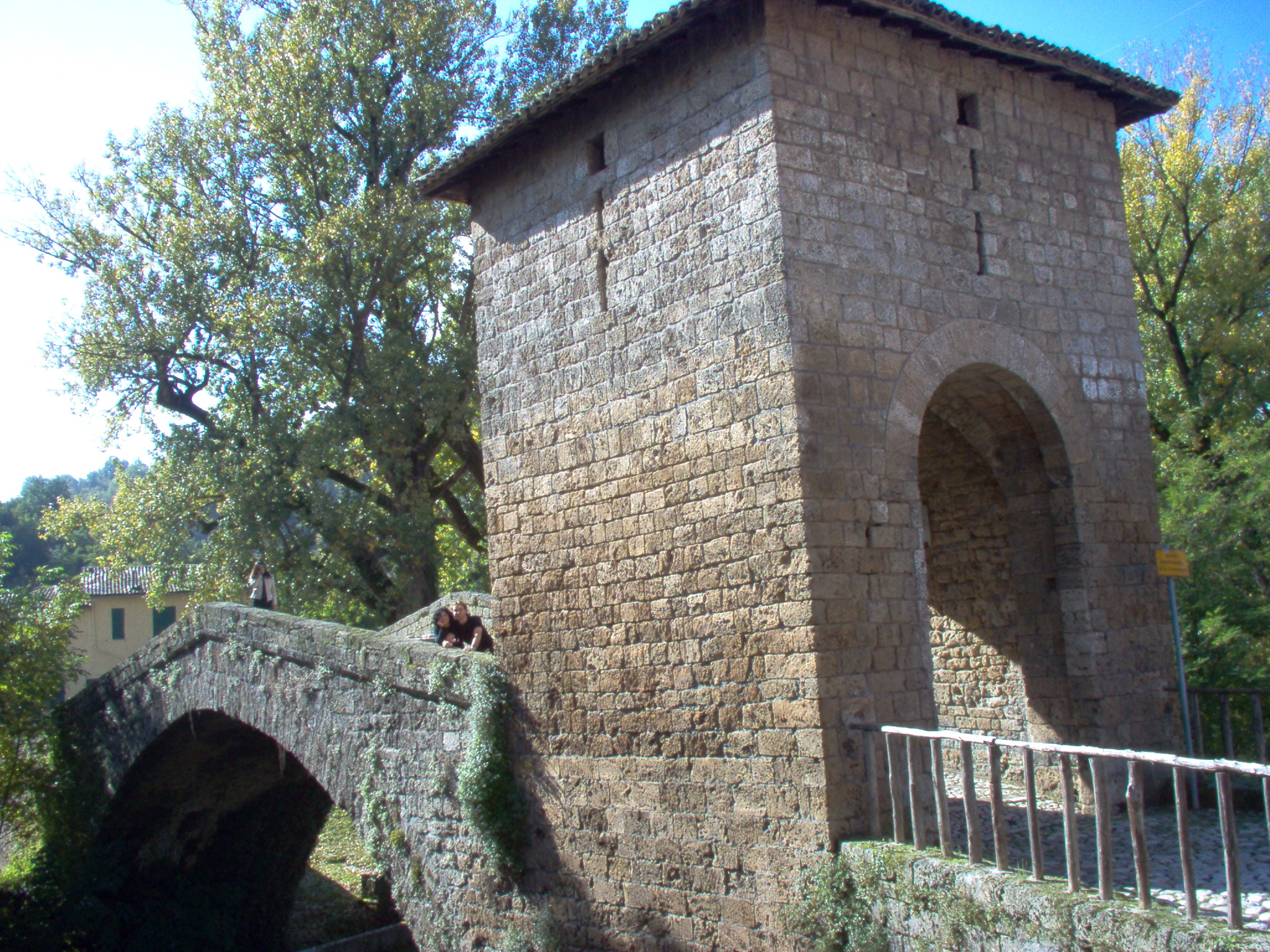
- Bridge tower protecting access to the Ponte di San Francesco
- Coordinates: 41°55′27″N 13°05′21″E
- Crosses: Aniene
- Locale: Subiaco, Lazio, Italy

Characteristics
- Design: Segmental arch bridge
- Material: "Cardellino" stones
- Longest span: 37 m (121 ft)
- No. of spans: 1

History
- Opened: 1358

The Ponte di San Francesco (English: "Bridge of Saint Francis") is a medieval segmental arch bridge over the River Aniene in Subiaco, in the Italian region of Lazio. Constructed in 1358, its single span measures 37 metres (121 ft).

== History ==
The bridge was constructed after the Tivoli-Subiaco conflict in 1358. Armed men from Subiaco took many Tivoli men hostage, then financing the construction of the bridge with the ransom money. The bridge was renovated in 1789 when Pius VI visited Subiaco.

It was underlined in a study by architects Santa Appodia and Lucia Finotti in 1982 that the testimony of the bridge history comes from an anonymous Chronicon (sublacence) dated to 1369.

Other notable historic bridges crossing the Aniene include the ancient Ponte Nomentano and Ponte Salario, both of which were also fortified with a tower.

In the 2010s, stones of the bridge's walls started to fall off, yet no renovation was undertaken rapidly (the Subiaco municipality refuted this critic). In 2021, the bridge was selected among the sets of Disney's planned production of Romeo and Juliet.

== Aniene fortified bridges ==
- Ponte Nomentano (Roman)
- Ponte Mammolo (Roman)
- Ponte Salario (Medieval)
