= Santa Caterina, Roccantica =

Church in Roccantica, Italy

Santa Caterina d'Alessandria is a small Roman Catholic church, located in the town of Roccantica, in the province of Rieti, region of Lazio, Italy.

== History ==
This church was built in the 13th-century near the highest points of the medieval portion of Roccantica. The simple structure is most notable for the interior frescoes depicting the life of St Catherine, painted by Pietro Coleberti of Priverno. The paintings are dated 1 June 1430, and the patron is noted to be Armellao di Esculo de’ Bastoni, who was named master of the castle by Pope Martin V in 1427. Among the scenes depicted are the Dispute between Catherine and the Philosophers, the Mystical Marriage of Catherine, the Flagellation of Catherine, the Conversion of the Empress, and Martyrdom of the Philosophers. The other frescoes are in poor state of conservation, depicting St Catherine reveals divine help to the Empress, the Martyrdom of the Wheel, the Martyrdom of the Empress, and Decapitation and Burial of St Catherine. The Crucifixion fresco above the altar is by a 15th-century Umbran painter. The small church or chapel is poorly accessible due to private ownership.
