= Ponte Nomentano =

Ancient Roman bridge in Rome

Ponte Nomentano (Pons Lamentanus)
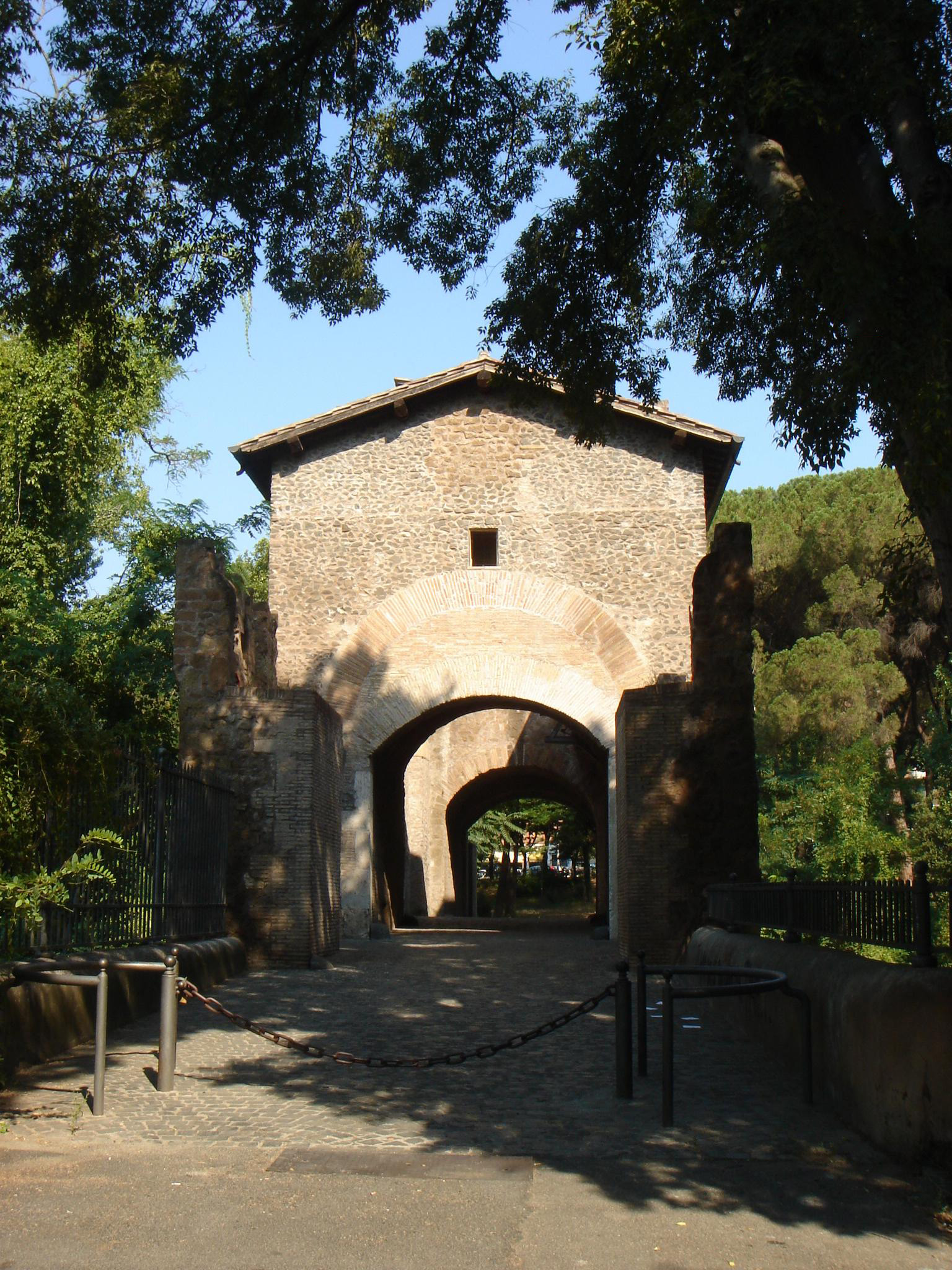
- Coordinates: 41.933611°N 12.5325°E
- Carries: Via Nomentana
- Crosses: Aniene
- Locale: Rome, Italy

Characteristics
- Design: Fortified arch bridge
- Material: Stone (incl. travertine), brick
- Total length: 60 m
- Width: 7.35 m
- Longest span: 15 m
- No. of spans: 3

History
- Construction end: Probably 1st century BC

Location
- Interactive map of Ponte Nomentano (Pons Lamentanus)

The Ponte Nomentano (called Pons Lamentanus during the Middle Ages) is a Roman bridge in Rome, Italy, which carried the Via Nomentana over the Aniene (Latin: Anio). Having lain outside the city limits for most of its history, the picturesque bridge is noted for its medieval bridge tower, which served to protect this important northern approach to Rome.

== History ==
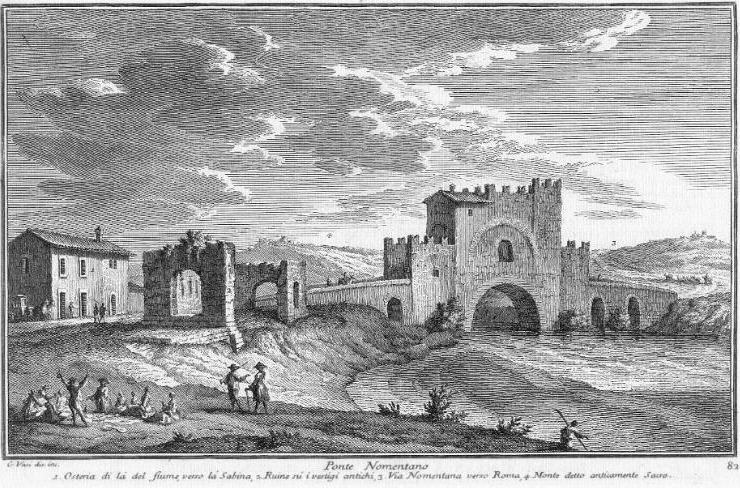
Ponte Nomentano by Giuseppe Vasi, c. 1752

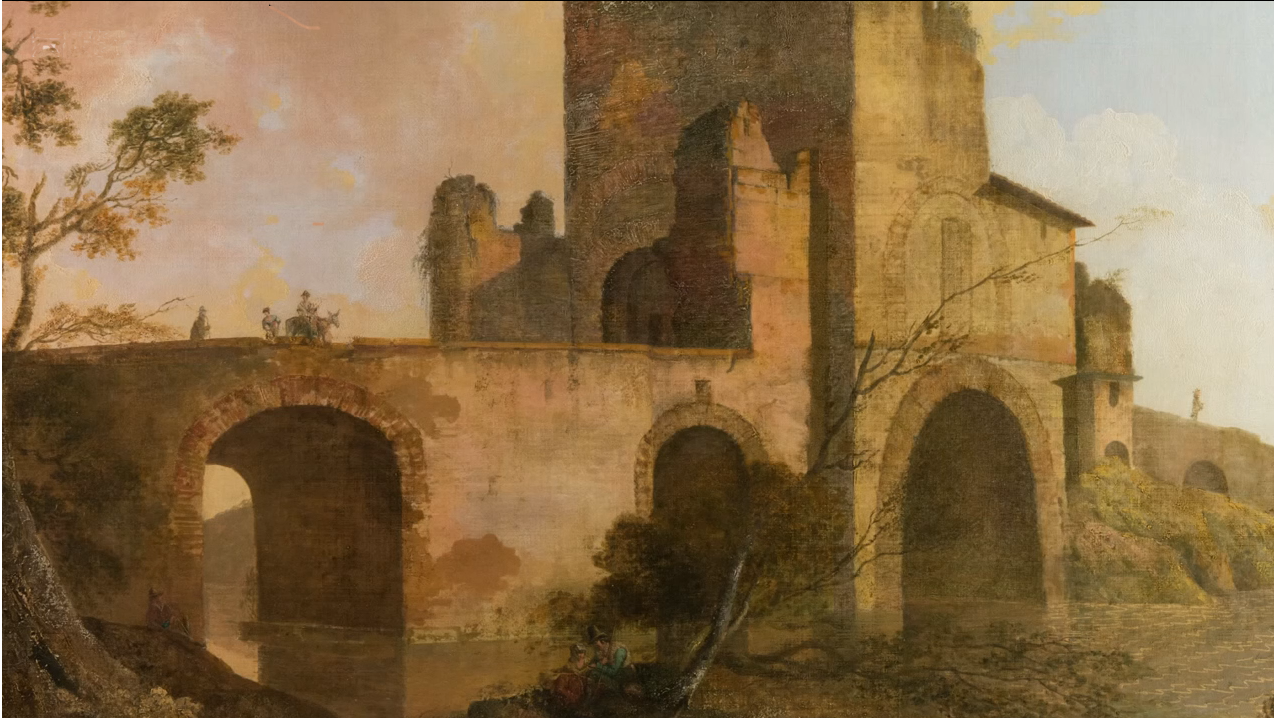
Painting by Joseph Wright of Derby in the 1770s

In antiquity, the Ponte Nomentano was located outside of the Aurelian Wall, at a distance of 3.9 km from the Porta Nomentana. The East Roman historian Procopius records that the bridge was destroyed by the Ostrogoths under their king Totila around 547 AD during the Gothic War, but rebuilt by the victorious Roman general Narses in 552. The still-intact late Republican fabric of the main arch, however, indicates that the bridge might have been only partially damaged in the event.

The lower part of the bridge tower dates, according to an unproven tradition, from the time of Pope Adrian I (772–795). The imposing castle-like structure was constructed during a general overhaul of the bridge by Pope Nicholas V (1447–1455), after which minor repairs followed in 1461, 1470, and 1474.

A view of the bridge was painted by English artist Joseph Wright of Derby in the 1770s. The painting was later badly overpainted, and it languished in the Derby Museum until it was rediscovered and restored in 2017, as documented by the television series Britain's Lost Masterpieces (series 2, episode 2).

In 1849, French troops cut the bridge by 7 m to check Garibaldi's advance on Rome, but it was soon restored.

Today, the bridge is surrounded by a park, well within the municipal limits of Rome, and restricted to pedestrians.

== Structure ==
The 31.30-meter-long superstructure of the Ponte Nomentano has, in essence, preserved its medieval character, while the dimensions of the bridge, which measure 60 m in overall length and 7.35 m in width, have remained practically unchanged since antiquity. The 15-meter-wide central arch clearly dates back to ancient times, it is presumed from the late Republic or early Augustan Principate, as indicated by its semi-circular shape and the execution of the travertine stonework. Apart from this, only some further layers of travertine in the retaining walls can be assigned with certainty to the Roman period. The two lateral brick arches were built in the reign of Pope Innocent X (1644–1655) in lieu of stone vaults.

Further examples for fortified bridges across the Aniene include the Roman Ponte Salario and Ponte Mammolo and the medieval Ponte di San Francesco in Subiaco.

== Gallery ==
Painting of the Ponte Nomentano around 1837

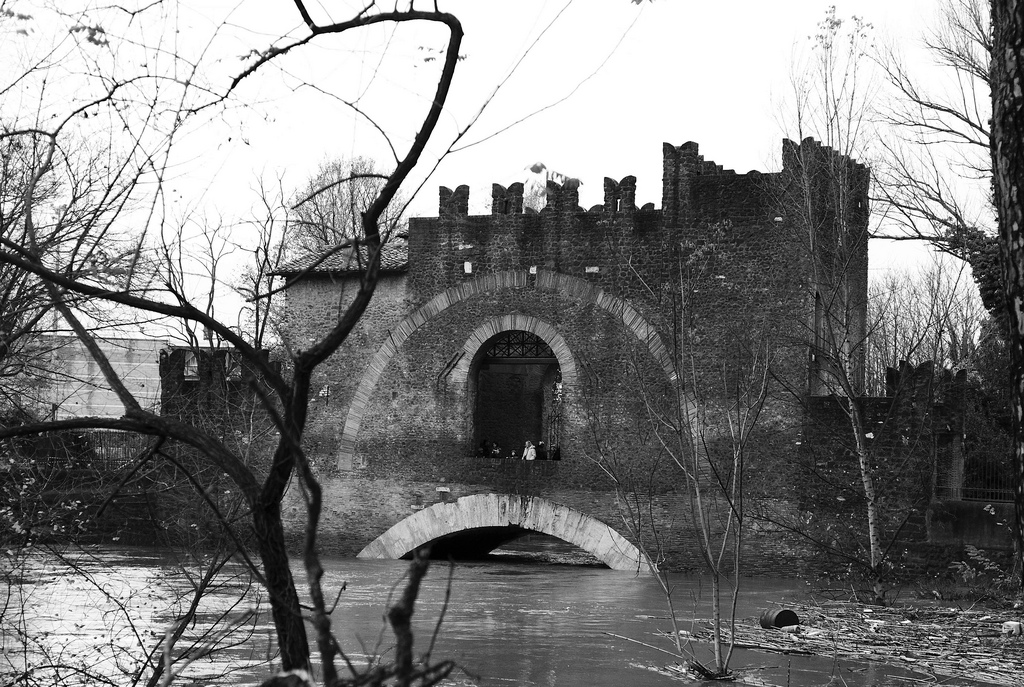
During 2008 flood

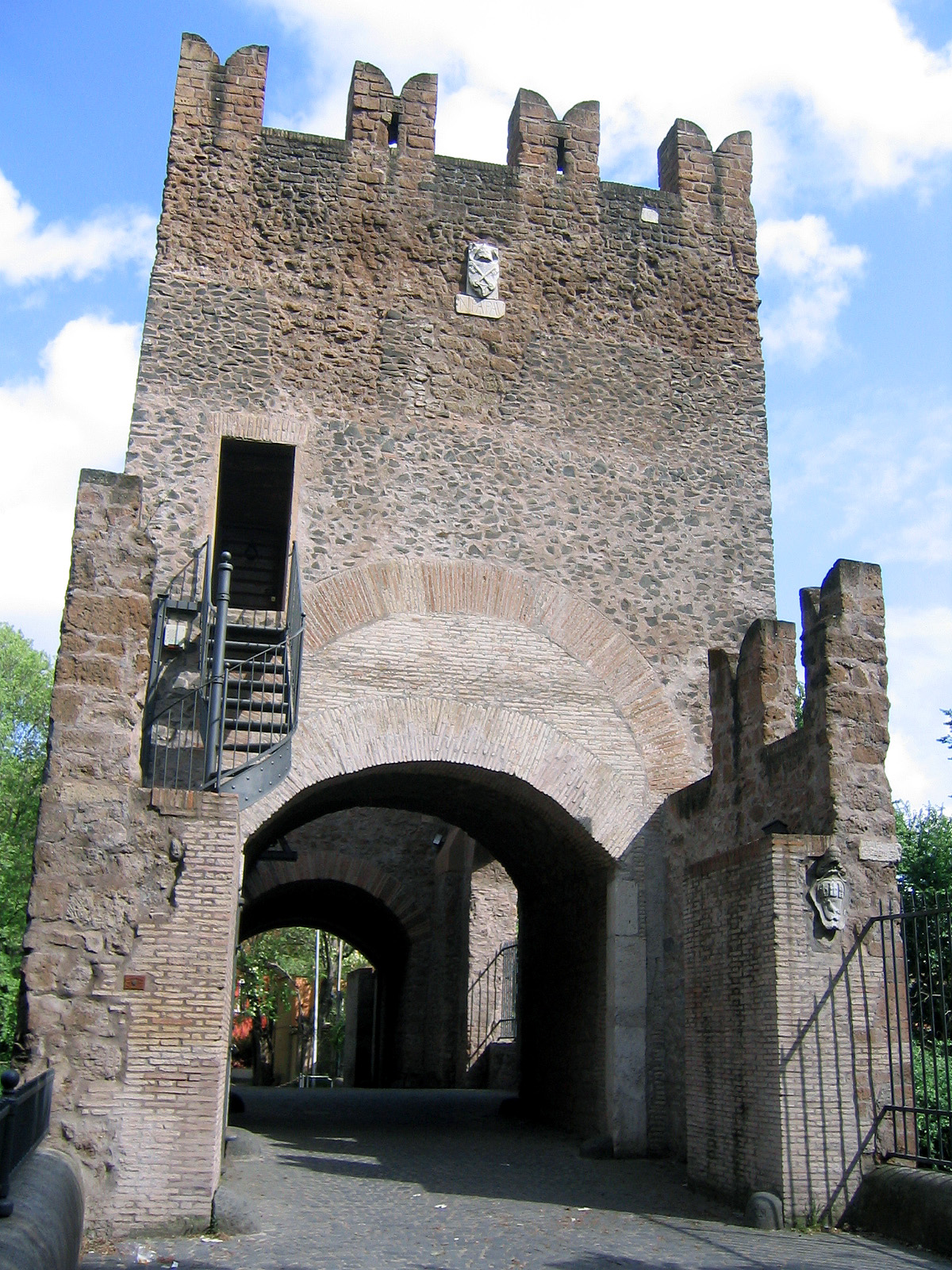
Medieval bridge tower

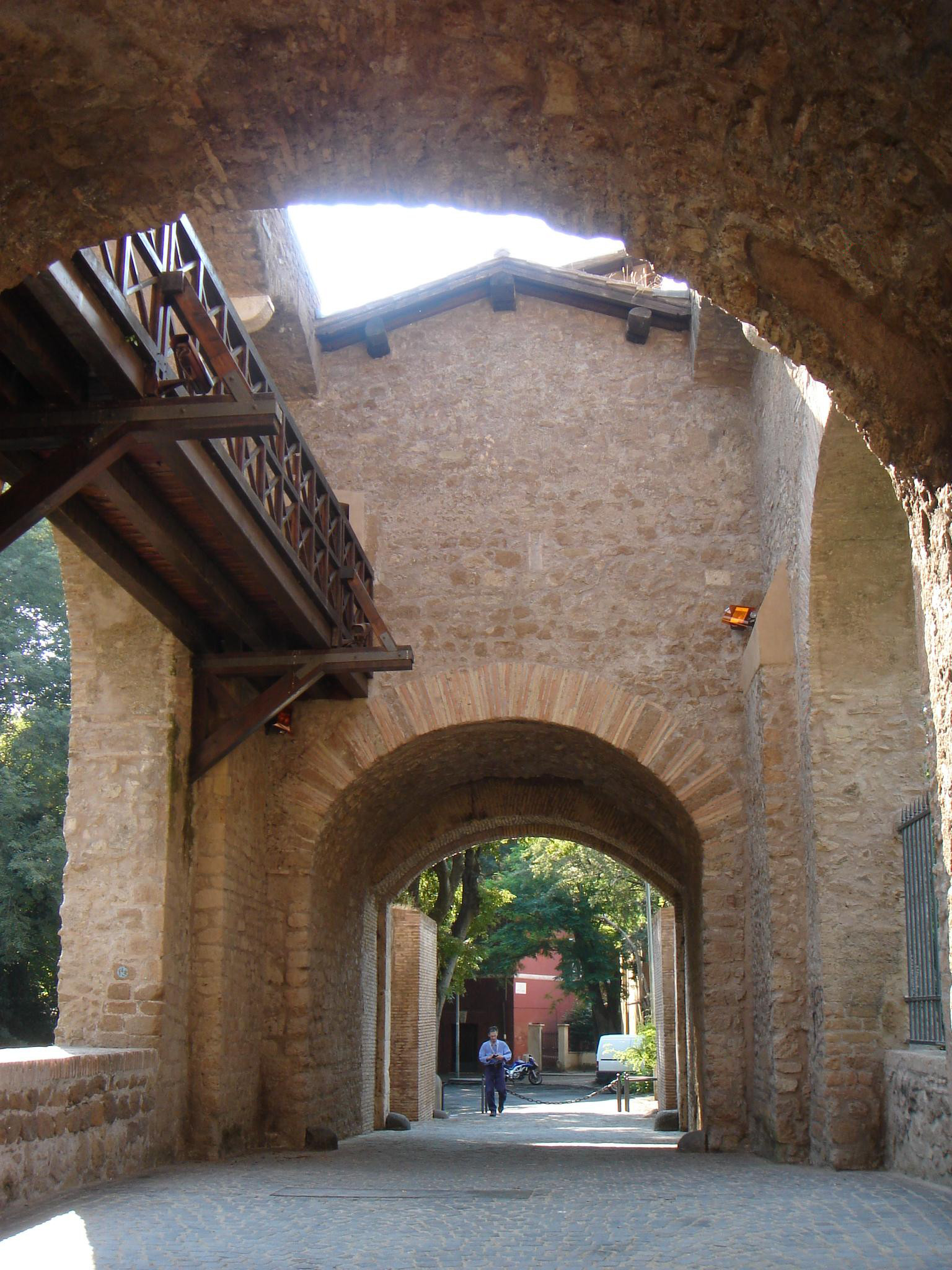
Passageway

== Aniene fortified bridges ==
- Ponte Mammolo (Roman)
- Ponte Salario (Medieval)
- Ponte di San Francesco (Medieval)

== See also ==
- List of Roman bridges
- Roman architecture
- Roman engineering

== Sources ==
- Galliazzo, Vittorio (1994), I ponti romani. Catalogo generale, vol. 2, Treviso: Edizioni Canova, pp. 37–39 (No. 21), ISBN 88-85066-66-6
- O’Connor, Colin (1993), Roman Bridges, Cambridge University Press, p. 68 (I15), ISBN 0-521-39326-4
