= Roccantica =

- Comune
- Comune di Roccantica
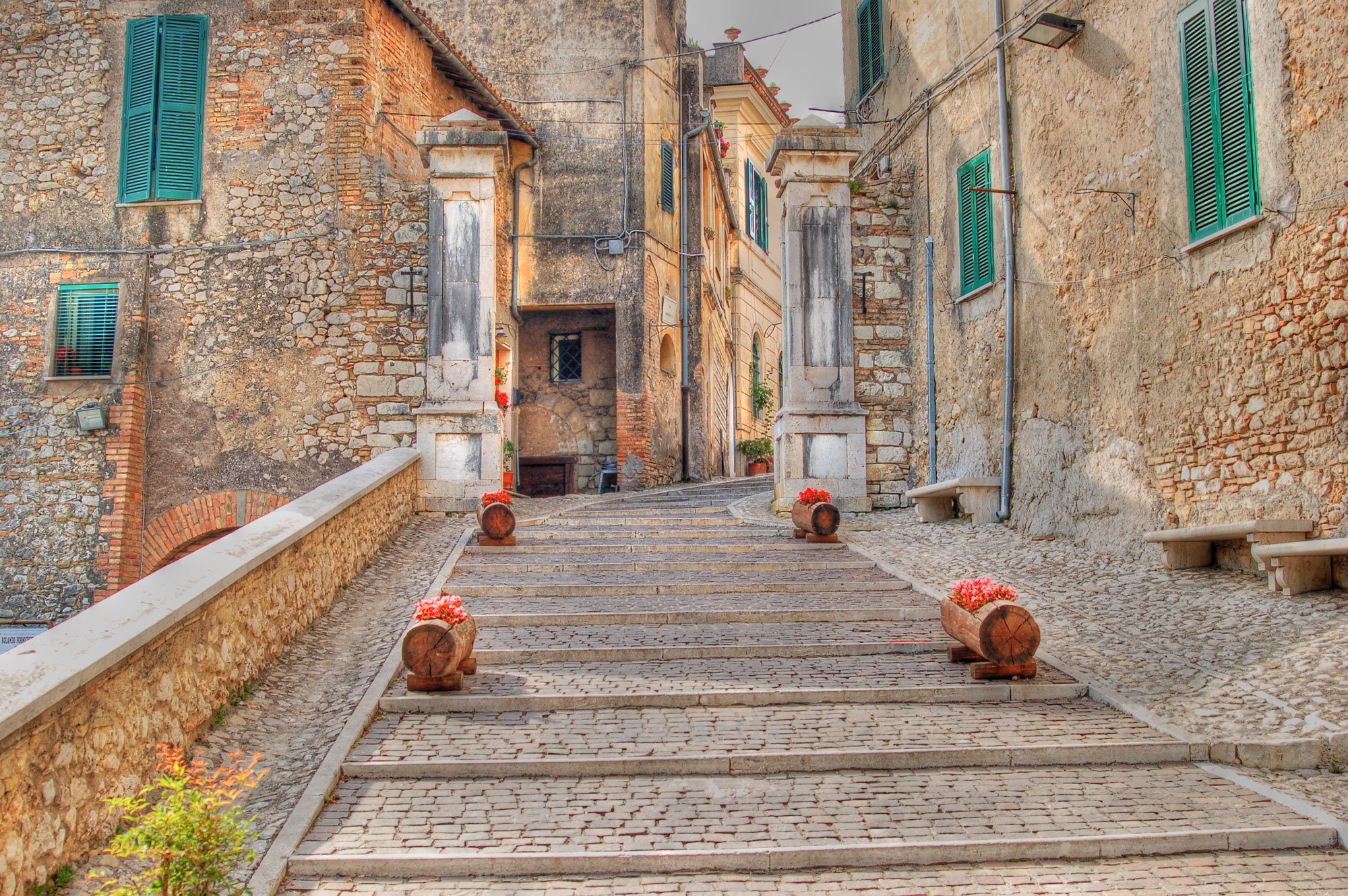
- View of Roccantica

- Coat of arms

- Location within Italy Location within Lazio
- Coordinates: 42°19′N 12°42′E
- Country: Italy
- Region: Lazio
- Province: Rieti (RI)
- Frazioni: Vallecupola

Government
  - Mayor: Alberto Sciarra

Area
  - Total: 16.7 km^{2} (6.4 sq mi)
- Elevation: 457 m (1,499 ft)

Population (31 December 2010)
  - Total: 627
  - Density: 37.5/km^{2} (97.2/sq mi)
- Demonym: Roccolani
- Time zone: UTC+1 (CET)
  - Summer (DST): UTC+2 (CEST)
- Postal code: 02040
- Dialing code: 0765
- Patron saint: St. Valentine
- Saint day: February 14
- Website: Official website

Roccantica is a comune (municipality) in the Province of Rieti in the Italian region of Latium, located about 50 kilometres (31 miles) northeast of Rome and about 15 kilometres (9 mi) southwest of Rieti.

The Gothic churches of San Valentin and Santa Caterina are notable; the latter houses 14th-century frescoes.
