= Ponte Salario =

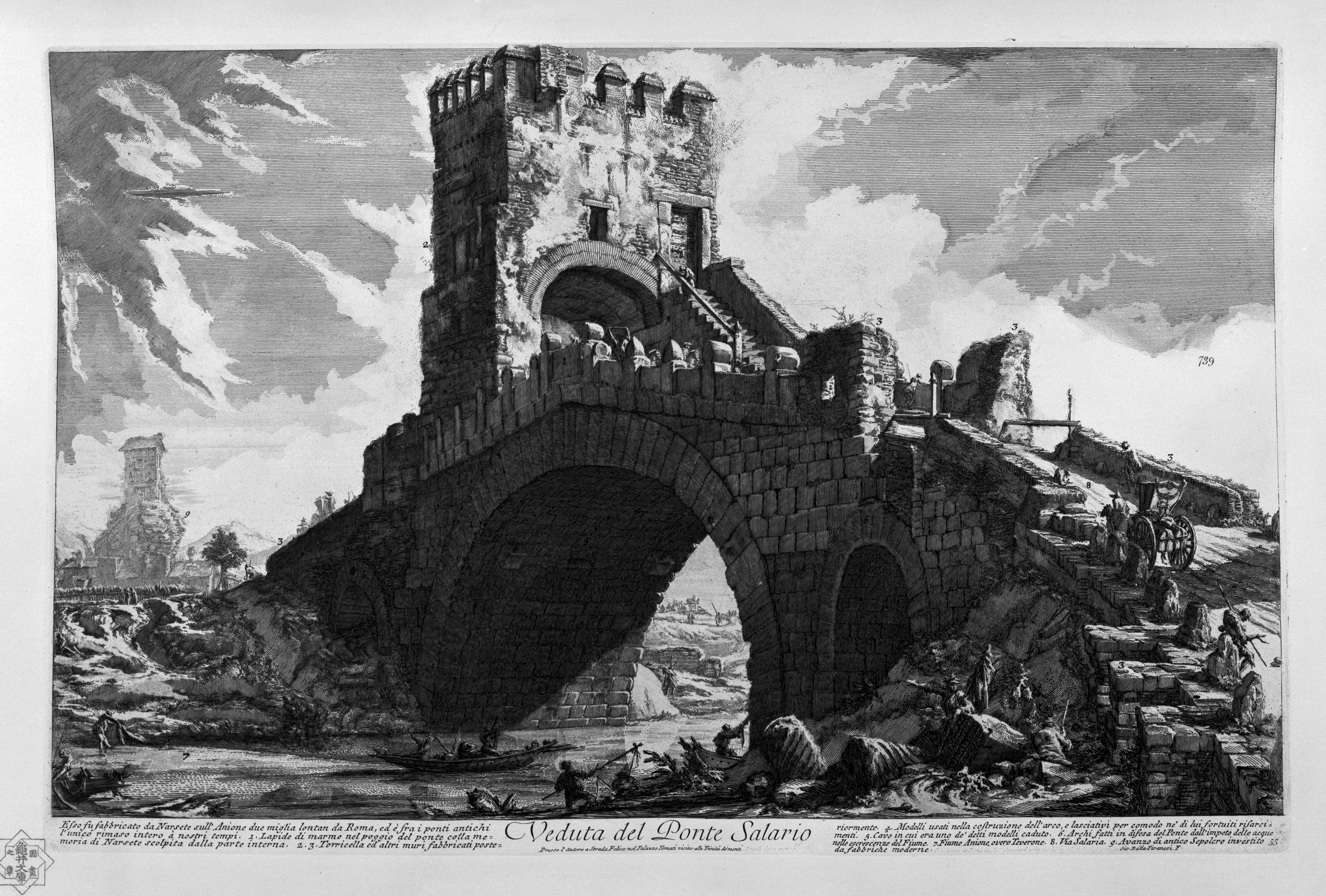
- Engraving of the Ponte Salario by Giovanni Battista Piranesi from between 1754–1760
- Coordinates: 41.939444°N 12.508333°E
- Carries: Via Salaria (SS4)
- Crosses: Aniene
- Locale: Rome, Italy
- Followed by: Current bridge (1874)

Characteristics
- Design: Arch bridge
- Total length: 72 m (historical bridge)
- Width: 6.52 m (historical bridge)
- Longest span: 24.86 m (historical bridge)

History
- Opened: 2nd–1st century BC (historical bridge)
- Closed: 1867 (historical bridge)

The Ponte Salario, also called Ponte Salaro during the Middle Ages, is a road bridge in Rome, Italy, whose origins date back to the Roman period. In antiquity, it lay outside the city limits, 3 km north of the Porta Collina, at the point where the Via Salaria (modern SS4) crossed the Aniene, a tributary of the Tiber. The visible side arches are assumed to originate from the first stone structure built during the 1st century BC.

In the Gothic War (535–554), the main arch was largely destroyed by the Ostrogothic king Totila, but repaired by his East Roman opponent Narses in 565, who recorded the extensive restoration works, including a river diversion, in an extant bridge inscription. At that time, the Ponte Salario was 72 m long and 6.52 m wide, with its semi-circular arch reaching a remarkable clear span of 24.86 m.

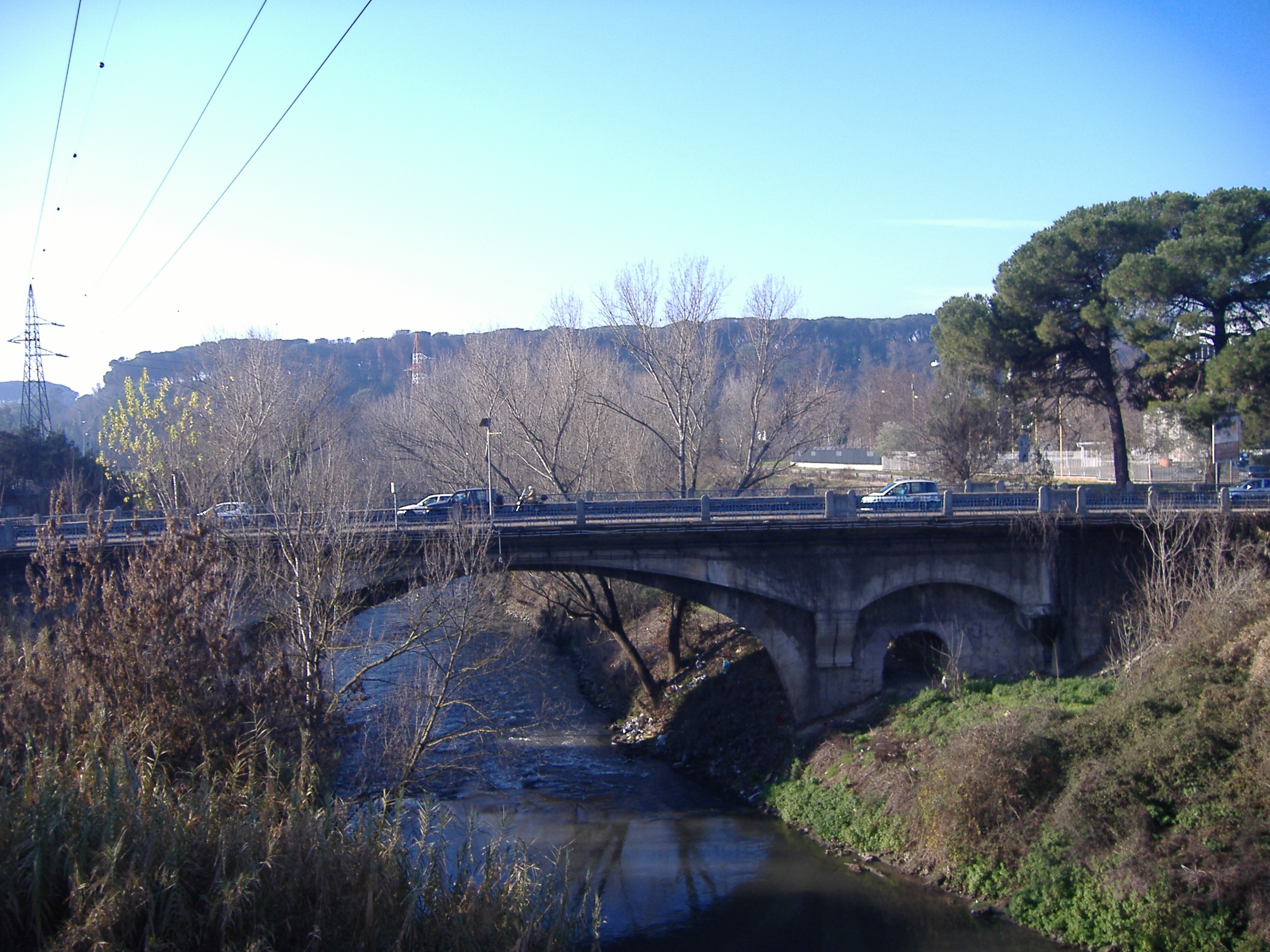
The current bridge

The large bridge tower was possibly erected in the 8th century, allowing more effective control of the passage. In 1798, the Ponte Salario, which had been hitherto well-preserved due to repeated repairs, was battered by Napoleonic troops, who tore down the balustrade, including the ancient inscription. In 1829, the medieval tower was demolished, and in 1849 the bridge was cut on a length of 15 m by French soldiers. In 1867, the bridge once and for all lost its historical character, when papal troops blew up the central arch. The Ponte Salario was reconstructed in its current form in 1874, with the roadway widened in 1930.

== Aniene fortified bridges ==
- Ponte Nomentano (Roman)
- Ponte Mammolo (Roman)
- Ponte di San Francesco in Subiaco (Medieval)

== See also ==
- List of Roman bridges
- Roman architecture
- Roman engineering

== Sources ==
- Galliazzo, Vittorio (1994), I ponti romani. Catalogo generale, vol. 2, Treviso: Edizioni Canova, pp. 45–48 (No. 32), ISBN 88-85066-66-6
- O’Connor, Colin (1993), Roman Bridges, Cambridge University Press, p. 68 (I14), ISBN 0-521-39326-4
