= Aniene =

River in Lazio, Italy

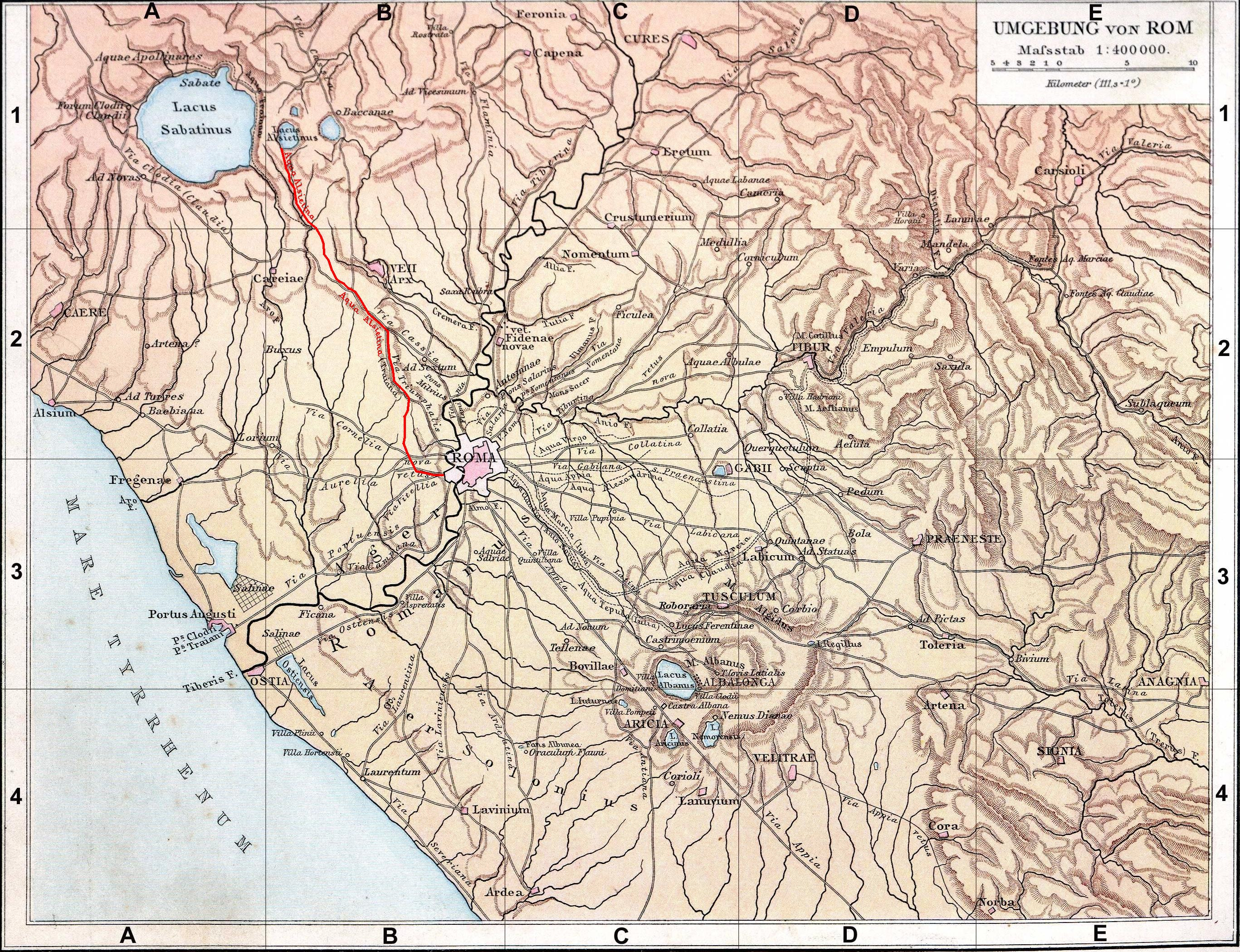
- An 1886 German map of the settlements, roads, and aqueducts around ancient Rome. The Aniene is the principal left-hand tributary of the Tiber, joining it in northern Rome.

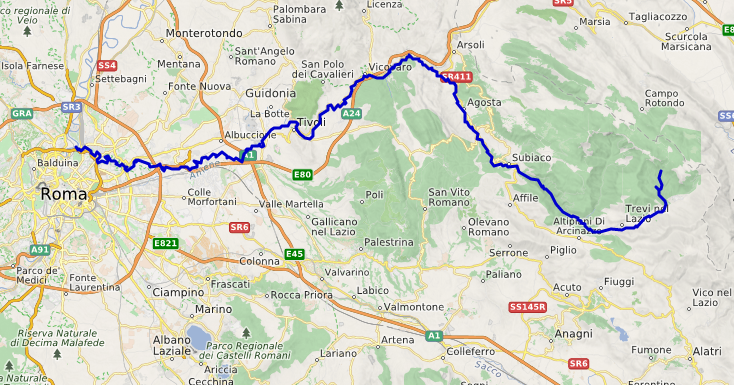

Location
- Country: Italy

Physical characteristics
- Source
  - location: Filettino
  - elevation: 1,075 m (3,527 ft)
- Mouth
  - location: Tiber (Rome, ponte Salario)
  - coordinates: 41.941745°N 12.50181°E
- Length: 99 km (62 mi)
- Basin size: 1,414 km^{2} (546 mi^{2})

Basin features
- Progression: Tiber→ Tyrrhenian Sea

The Aniene (pronounced [aˈnjɛːne]; Latin: Aniō), formerly known as the Teverone, is a 99-kilometer (62 mi) river in Lazio, Italy. It originates in the Apennines at Trevi nel Lazio and flows westward past Subiaco, Vicovaro, and Tivoli to join the Tiber in northern Rome. It formed the principal valley east of ancient Rome and became an important water source as the city's population expanded. The falls at Tivoli were noted for their beauty. Historic bridges across the river include the Ponte Nomentano, Ponte Mammolo, Ponte Salario, and Ponte di San Francesco, all of which were originally fortified with towers.

== Name ==
The river was known to the Romans as Aniō; this is of unknown etymology, but Francisco Villar Liebana has suggested a root *an- that is found in many river names, such as the Ana (Guadiana) and Anisus (Enns). Plutarch derived the name from a mythical Etruscan king Anius who drowned in the river.

== History ==
=== Classical antiquity ===
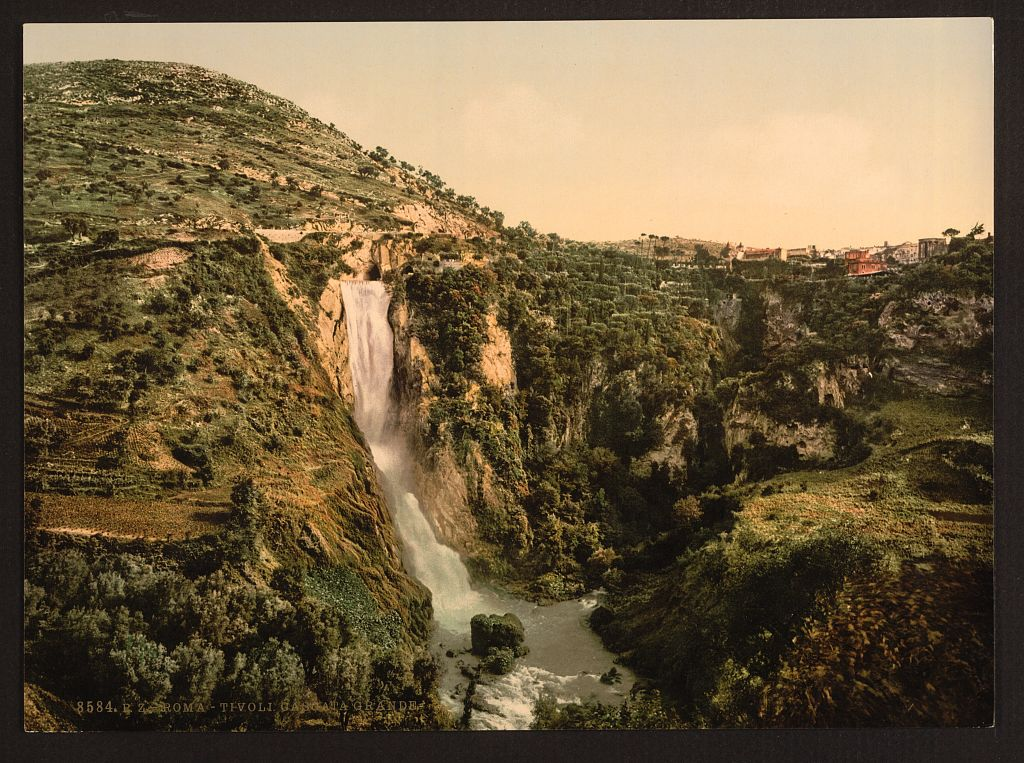
Cascade of the river Aniene in Tivoli, 1890.

The confluence of the Aniene and Tiber was controlled by Antemnae, a Latin settlement on a hill just to its south. Rome's foundation myths numbered them among the Sabines seized by Romulus but that his wife Hersilia convinced him to make its people Roman citizens after their defeat and annexation around 752 BC.

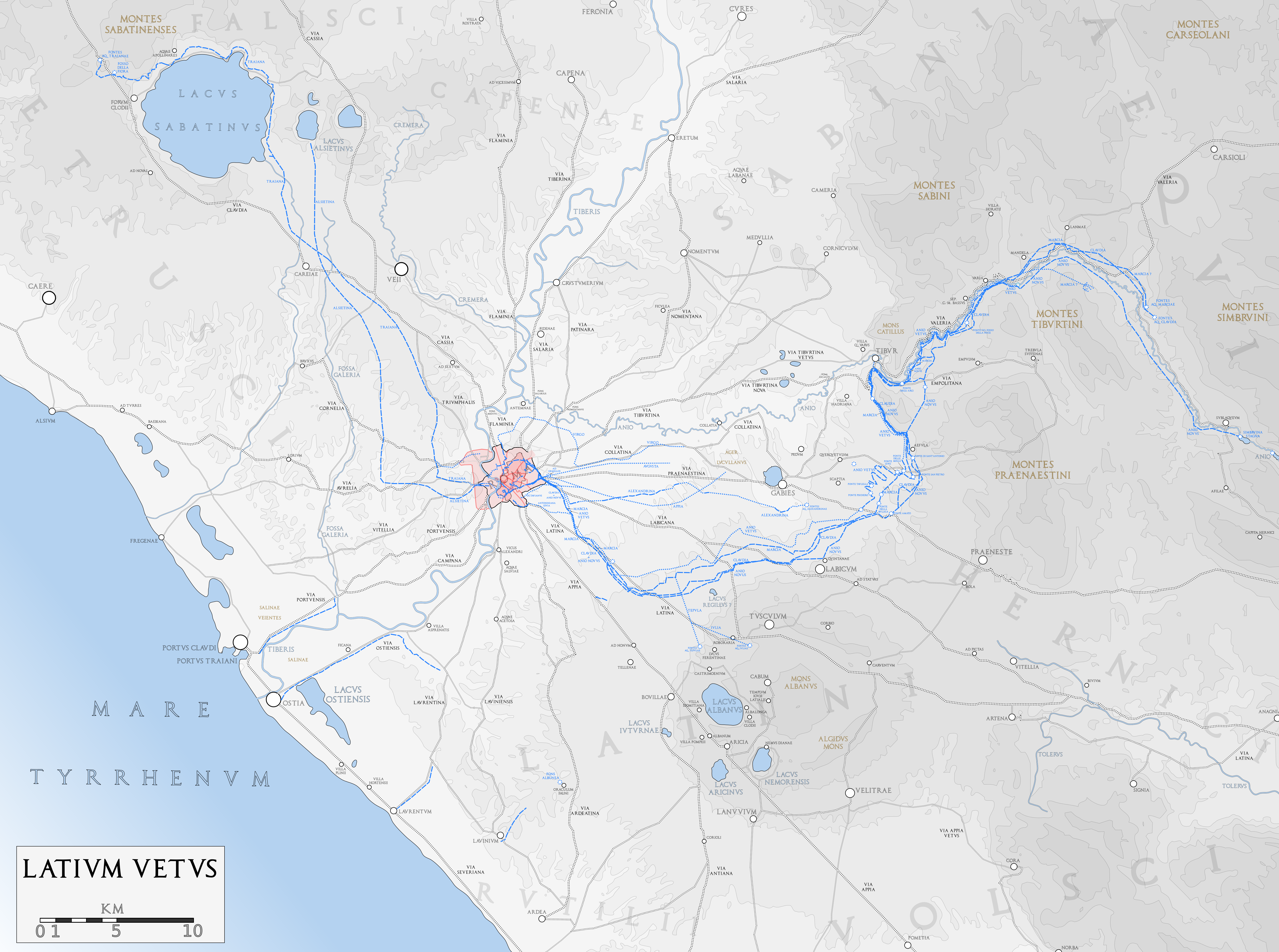
Map showing aqueduct sources

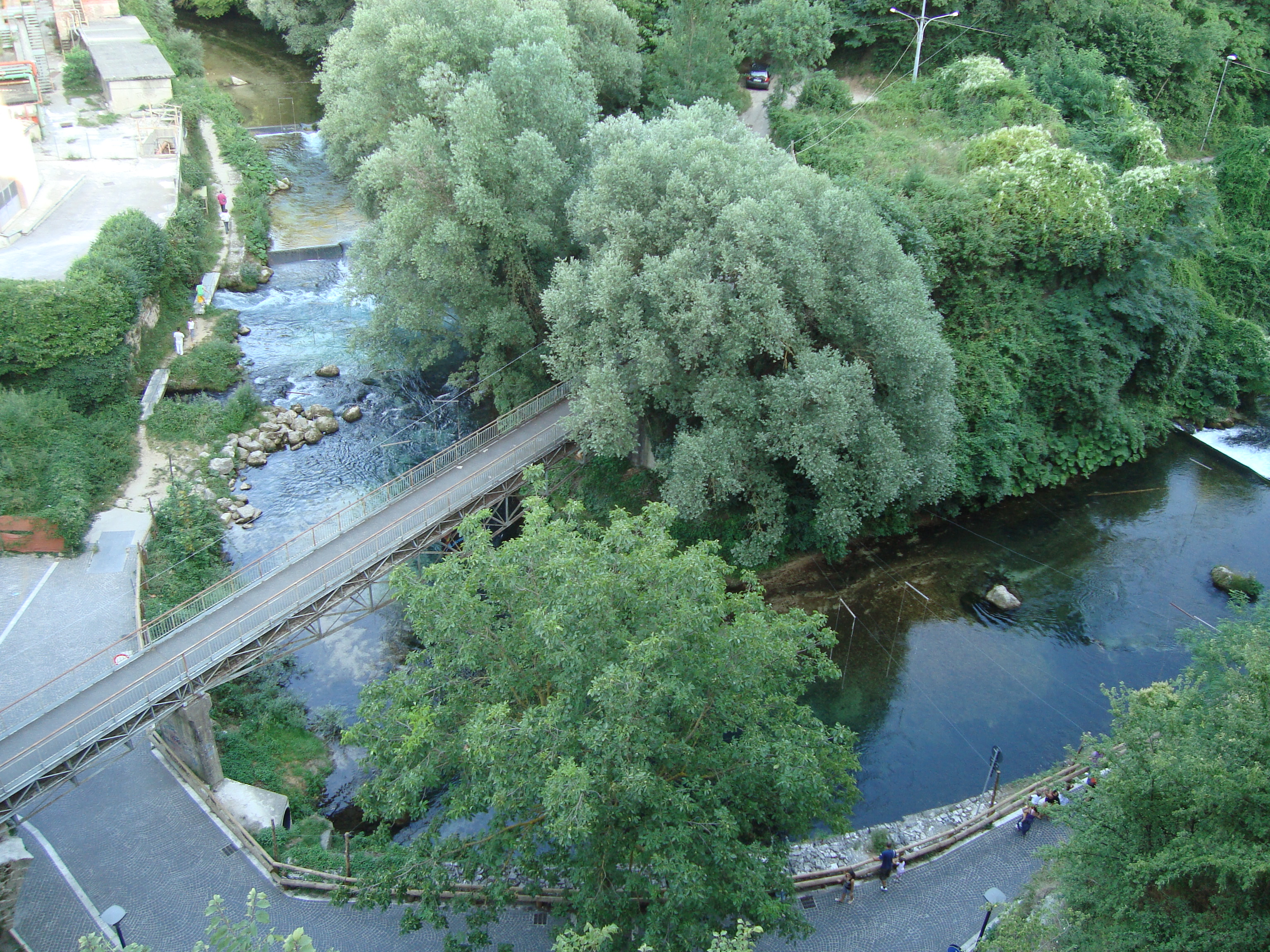
The Aniene in Subiaco.

In antiquity, three principal aqueducts of Rome—the Aqua Anio Vetus, Aqua Anio Novus and Aqua Claudia—had their sources in the Aniene valley. Together with the Aqua Marcia, they were regarded as the "four great aqueducts of Rome". The Aqua Anio Vetus (Latin for "Old Anio aqueduct") was constructed around 270 BC. The Aqua Anio Novus ("New Anio aqueduct") was begun under Caligula around AD 38 and completed under Claudius in 48. A third aqueduct, the Aqua Marcia, was constructed by Q. Marcius Rex between 144 and 140 BC using the proceeds from the destructions of Corinth and Carthage in 146 BC.

The emperor Nero created three lakes on the river for his villa at Subiaco. The largest of these dams was the highest dam in classical antiquity and remained in use until its destruction by a flood in 1305. Trajan eventually connected the Anio Novus to one of these lakes.

=== Nineteenth century ===
A series of floods during the early nineteenth century, especially the most serious one in 1826, prompted Popes Leo XII and Gregory XVI, as sovereigns of the Papal States, to undertake construction works to control the flow of the water. This included canalisation of the river upstream from Tivoli, excavation of a tunnel through Monte Catillo, and a diversion of the river around Tivoli.

== See also ==
- Rome's Aqueducts

== Sources ==
- "Anio" , Encyclopædia Britannica, vol. II (9th ed.), New York: Charles Scribner's Sons, 1878, p. 57.
- Hodge, A. Trevor (1992), Roman Aqueducts & Water Supply, London: Duckworth, ISBN 0-7156-2194-7
- Schnitter, Niklaus (1978), "Römische Talsperren", Antike Welt, 8 (2): 25–32
- Smith, Norman (1970), "The Roman Dams of Subiaco", Technology and Culture, 11 (1): 58–68, doi:10.2307/3102810, JSTOR 3102810
- Smith, Norman (1971), A History of Dams, London: Peter Davies, ISBN 0-432-15090-0
