= Via Nomentana =

Historical Italian road

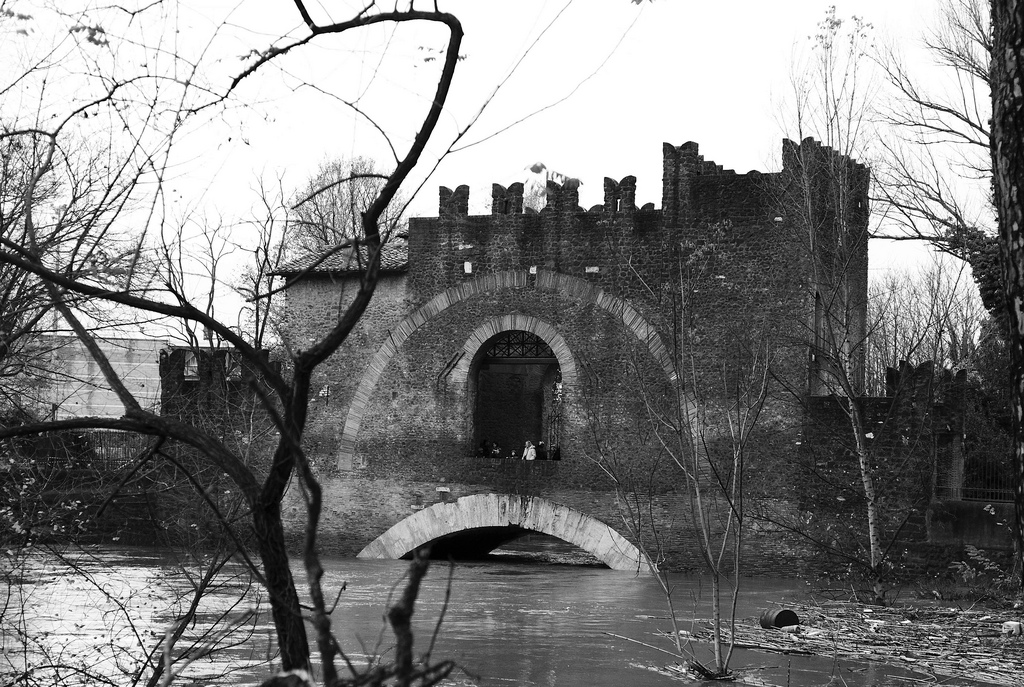
The Ponte Nomentano, one of the bridges on the Via Nomentana, during the 2008 flood

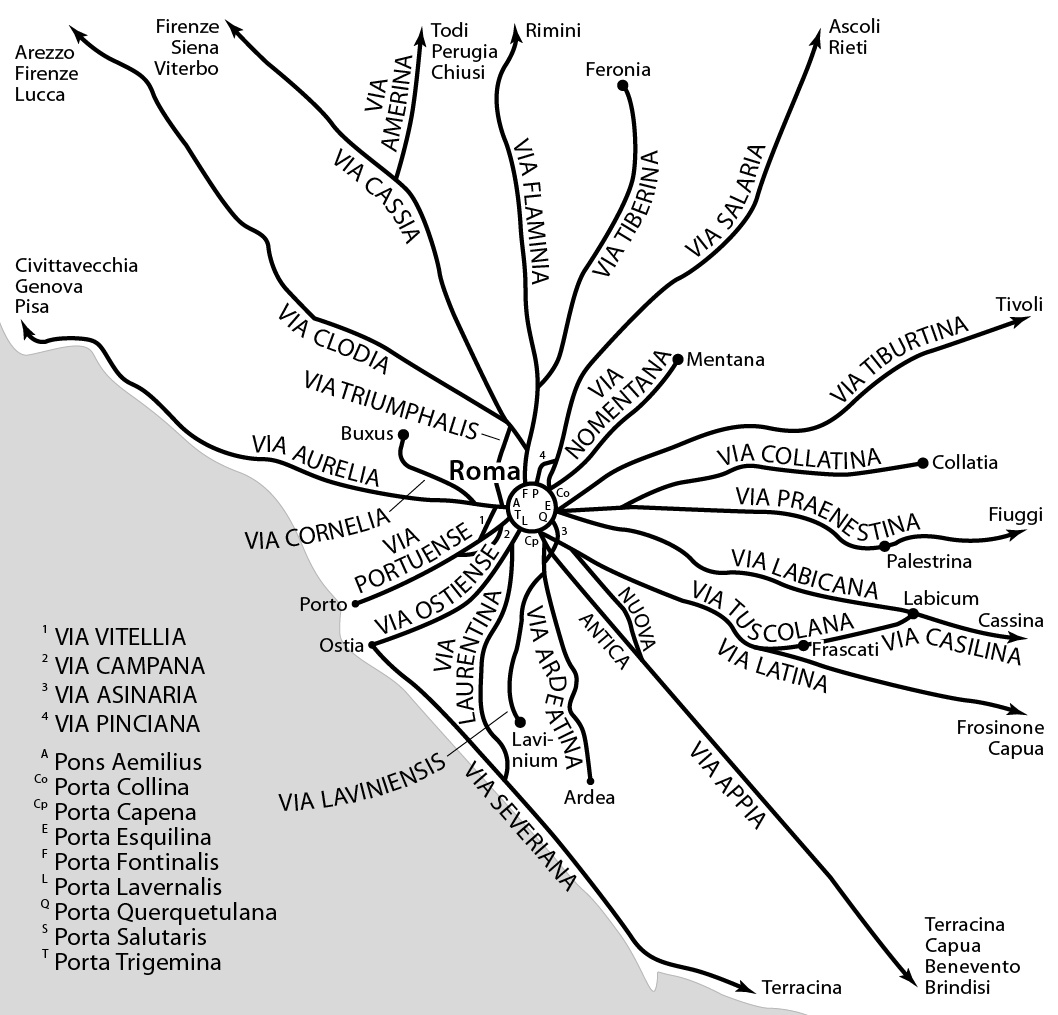
Roman roads around Rome

The Via Nomentana was an ancient Roman road in Italy, leading North-East from Rome to Nomentum (modern Mentana), a distance of 23 km (14 mi). It originally bore the name "Via Ficulensis", from the old Latin village of Ficulea, about 13 km (8.1 mi) from Rome. It was subsequently extended to Nomentum, but never became an important high road, and merged in the Via Salaria a few kilometers beyond Nomentum. It is followed as far as Nomentum by the modern state road, but some traces of its pavement still exist.

The road started at the Porta Collina in the Servian Walls until the third century, when emperor Aurelian built the Porta Nomentana in his new set of walls.

== Findings ==
A sarcophagus found along the Via Nomentana commemorates a woman named Julia Irene Arista, apparently a Jewish woman. According to the inscription, she was "filled with the virtue of God and the faith of the chosen people," and lived as one "who observed the Laws exactly."

== Roman bridges ==
There are the remains of at least one Roman bridge along the road, the Ponte Nomentano.

== See also ==
- Roman road
- Roman bridge
- Roman engineering
