= Ubaza =

Ubaza was an ancient city and bishopric in Roman North Africa, which remains a Latin titular see.

== History ==
Ubaza was among the many towns in the Roman province of Numidia that were important enough to become a suffragan bishopric, but faded. Its present location is in modern Terrebaza, Algeria.

Its only recorded residential bishops both attended the council called in 484 at Carthage by Huneric of the Vandal Kingdom :

- the Catholic Victor, banished afterwards
- the Donastist heretic Secondinus.

== Titular see ==
The diocese was nominally restored in 1928 as Latin titular bishopric of Ubaza (Latin = Curiate Italian) / Ubazen(sis) (Latin adjective).

It has had the following incumbents, so far of the fitting Episcopal (lowest) rank:

- Aston Sebastian Joseph Chichester, Jesuits (S.J.) (4 March 1931 – 1 January 1955) as last Apostolic Vicar of Salisbury (the (Southern) Rhodesia, now Zimbabwe) (4 March 1931 – 1 January 1955), later first Metropolitan Archbishop of Salisbury (now Harare, Zimbabwe) (1 January 1955 – 23 November 1956), emeritate as Titular Archbishop of Velebusdus (23 November 1956 – death 24 October 1962)
- Patrick H. Cronin, Columban Missionaries (S.S.C.M.E.) (24 May 1955 – 13 October 1970) as Bishop-Prelate of Territorial Prelature of Ozamis (Philippines) (24 May 1955 – 13 October 1970); later Metropolitan Archbishop of Cagayan de Oro (Philippines) (13 October 1970 – retired 5 January 1988), died 1991
- Eduardo Herrera Riera (31 October 1970 – 5 July 1994) as Auxiliary Bishop of Archdiocese of Barquisimeto (Venezuela) (31 October 1970 – 5 July 1994); previously Titular Bishop of Sesta (7 January 1965 – 30 November 1966) as Auxiliary Bishop of Cumaná (Venezuela) (7 January 1965 – 30 November 1966), Bishop of Guanare (Venezuela) (30 November 1966 – 31 October 1970); later Bishop of Carora (Venezuela) (5 July 1994 – retired 5 December 2003), died 2012
- Francis Xavier Irwin (24 July 1996 – ), emeritus as former auxiliary bishop of Archdiocese of Boston (Massachusetts, US), no previous prelature.

== Other uses ==
- a fraction of Moniquirá, a town and municipality in Boyacá Department, part of the subregion of the Ricaurte Province, Colombia

== See also ==
- List of Catholic dioceses in Algeria

== Sources and external links ==
- GCatholic - (former and) titular see

Bibliography

- Stefano Antonio Morcelli, Africa christiana, Volume I, Brescia, 1816, pp. 347–348
- J. Mesnage, L'Afrique chrétienne, Paris, 1912, p. 383
- H. Jaubert, Anciens évêchés et ruines chrétiennes de la Numidie et de la Sitifienne, in Recueil des Notices et Mémoires de la Société archéologique de Constantine, vol. 46, 1913, pp. 103–104
