= Nelson Martínez Rust =

Venezuelan Roman Catholic prelate (1944–2026)

Most Reverend Nelson Antonio Martínez Rust
- Bishop Emeritus of San Felipe
- Church: Roman Catholic Church
- Archdiocese: Barquisimeto
- Diocese: San Felipe
- Installed: 29 February 1992
- Term ended: 11 March 2016
- Predecessor: Ovidio Pérez Morales
- Successor: Victor Hugo Basabe
- Previous posts: Auxiliary Bishop of Valencia and Titular Bishop of Bararus (1982–1992)

Orders
- Ordination: 15 December 1968
- Consecration: 25 March 1982 by Luis Eduardo Henríquez Jiménez

Personal details
- Born: Nelson Antonio Martínez Rust; 10 June 1944 Puerto Cabello, Carabobo, Venezuela
- Died: 3 May 2026 (aged 81) Valencia, Carabobo, Venezuela
- Education: Pontifical Gregorian University
- Motto: Veritas et vita

Nelson Antonio Martínez Rust (10 June 1944 – 3 May 2026) was a Venezuelan Roman Catholic prelate, who served as the second bishop of the Diocese of San Felipe from 1992 until 2016. He previously served as an auxiliary bishop of the Archdiocese of Valencia in Venezuela and titular bishop of Bararus from 1982 until 1992.

== Biography ==
Nelson Martínez Rust was born on 10 June 1944 in Puerto Cabello, in the state of Carabobo, Venezuela. He completed his priestly formation at the Interdiocesan Seminary of Caracas and continued his higher education in Rome at the Pontifical Gregorian University, where he specialized in Sacred Scripture.

He was ordained a priest for the Archdiocese of Valencia on 15 December 1968. On 8 January 1982, Pope John Paul II appointed him Auxiliary Bishop of Valencia and Titular Bishop of Bararus. He received his episcopal consecration on 25 March 1982 from Archbishop Luis Eduardo Henríquez Jiménez.

On 29 February 1992, Martínez Rust was appointed Bishop of the Diocese of San Felipe. During his tenure, he was known for his focus on pastoral work and the academic formation of local seminarians. After 24 years of service in San Felipe, Pope Francis accepted his resignation on 11 March 2016.

Following his retirement, he resided in Valencia as Bishop Emeritus. He died there on 3 May 2026, at the age of 81.

Catholic Church titles
Preceded by Tomás Enrique Márquez Gómez	Bishop of San Felipe; 1992–2016	Succeeded by Victor Hugo Basabe
Preceded by —	Auxiliary Bishop of Valencia; 1982–1992	Succeeded by —
Preceded by Michael Augustine	Titular Bishop of Bararus; 1982–1992	Succeeded by Zef Simoni
