= La Asunción Cathedral =

Roman Catholic church in Venezuela

Coordinates: 11°1′47.02″N 63°52′0.44″W

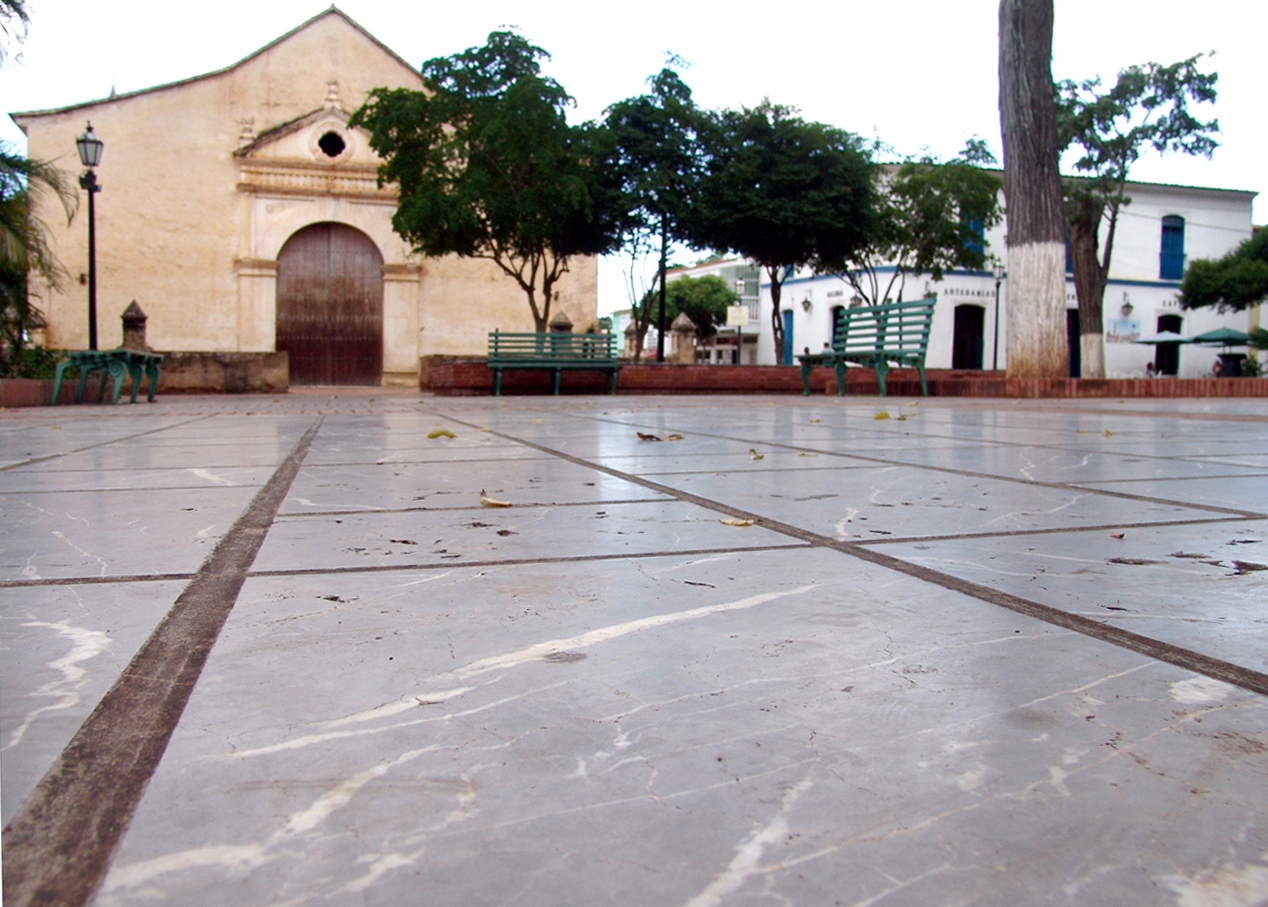
Exterior view of the cathedral.

Catedral de Nuestra Señora de La Asunción (Cathedral of Our Lady of the Assumption) is the seat of the Roman Catholic Diocese of Margarita and is located in La Asunción, Nueva Esparta state, on Margarita Island, Venezuela. With construction beginning in 1570, it is the oldest church in Venezuela.

== History ==
A cathedral was originally built on the site between 1570 and 1571, making the Catedral Nuestra Señora de La Asunción the oldest church in Venezuela, and one of the first in the Americas. Its construction was started in 1570 (much before the construction of the cathedral of Santa Ana de Coro) and was never completed. The church was founded by a member of the Dominican order, the priest Juan de Manzanillo. It was later destroyed by French Lutherans, and by the year 1602 the cathedral was reported to be in ruins. Work for reconstruction of the building began again in 1609, and the cathedral was finally completed eleven years later, in 1621.

Due to its age and the importance of the architecture, the church was inscribed as an Historic National Monument of Venezuela in 1960.

The cathedral serves as the seat of the Diocese of Margarita, which was created by Pope Paul VI on 18 July 1969.

== Features ==
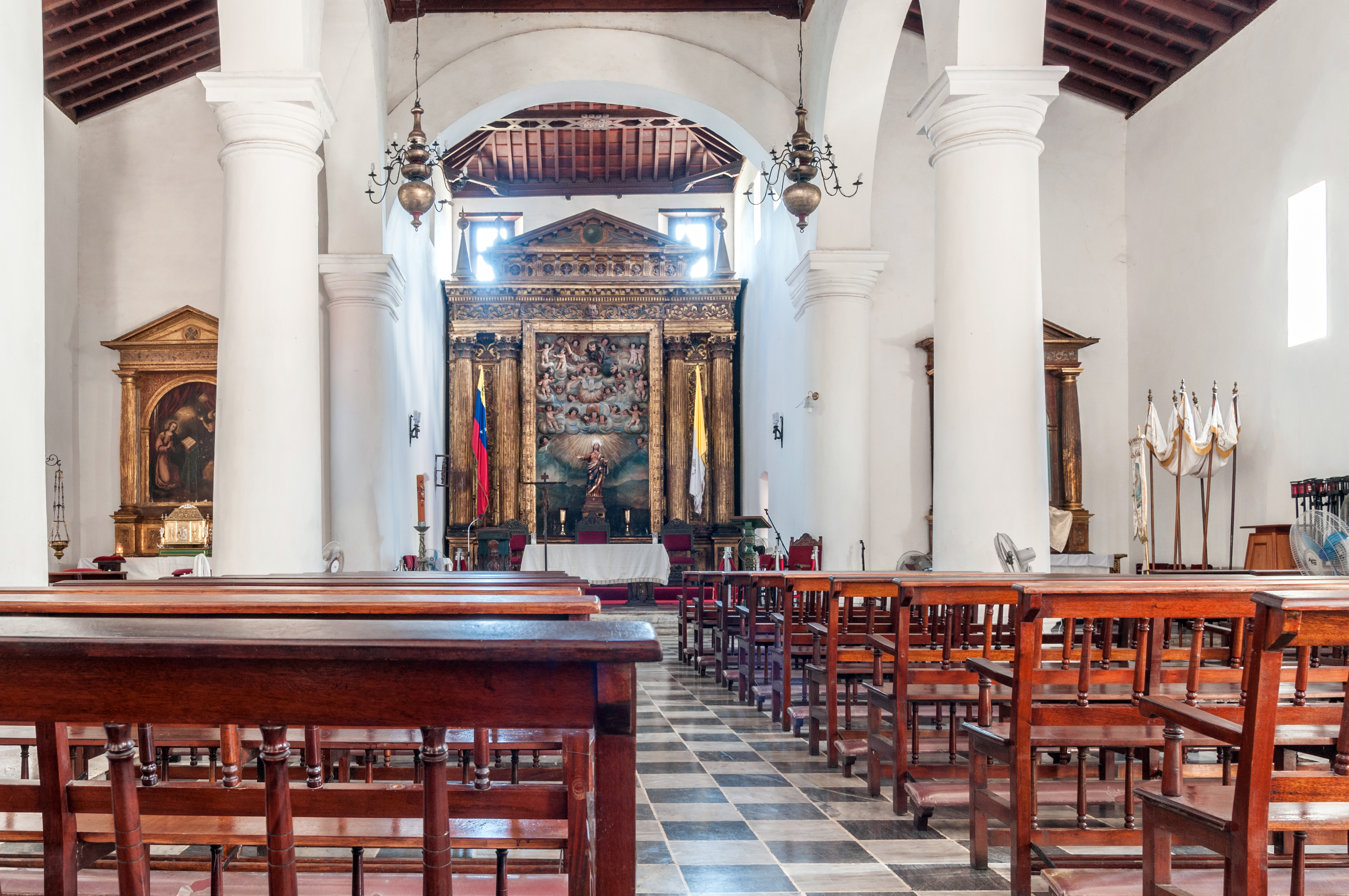
Interior view.

Set in the tree lined Plaza Bolivar, the church has a rectangular plan, with stone walls. The main body of the cathedral has dimensions of 17 by 48 metres (56 by 157 ft), and the interior is lined with two rows of huge columns in the tuscan style which support the roof. There is a bell tower outside, which is unique and the bells are now preserved in the plaza. One of the most important religious buildings on the Island, the Virgin of La Asunción is worshiped here. The cathedral has been declared a historical city monument. It has a plain façade and interior, but its left lateral tower, which dates to 1599, is the oldest in the country. The façade at the entrance portal of the church is built in the renaissance style. It was considered a model church till the 19th century.

== Bishop ==
In 2023, the current bishop is Bishop Fernando José Castro Aguayo who has been in post since summer 2015.

Previous bishops include:

- Bishop Francisco de Guruceaga Iturriza until 1973
- Bishop Tulio Manuel Chirivella Varela 1974 to 1982
- Bishop César Ramón Ortega Herrera 1983 to 1998
- Bishop Rafael Ramón Conde Alfonzo 1999 to 2008
- Bishop Jorge Anibal Quintero Chacón 2008 to 2014

== Festival ==
The most important festival in the Liturgical year is held on 15 August, to celebrate the Assumption of the Virgin Mary. A procession is held and mass offered in the church.

== See also ==
- Catholic Church in Venezuela
- List of cathedrals in Venezuela
