= Diego Padrón =

Venezuelan Cardinal of the Roman Catholic church (born 1939)

His Eminence Diego Rafael Padrón Sánchez
- Cardinal, Archbishop Emeritus of Cumaná
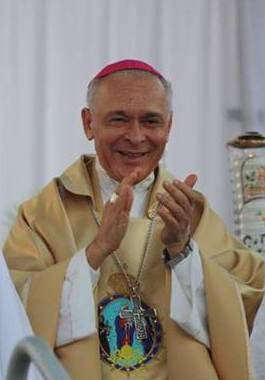
- Padrón in 2013
- Church: Roman Catholic Church
- Archdiocese: Cumaná
- See: Cumaná
- Appointed: 27 March 2002
- Installed: 25 May 2002
- Term ended: 24 May 2018
- Predecessor: Alfredo José Rodríguez Figueroa
- Successor: Jesús Andoni González de Zárate Salas
- Other post: Cardinal Priest of San Gaetano (2023–)
- Previous posts: Titular Bishop of Gisipa (1990–94); Auxiliary Bishop of Caracas (1990-94); Bishop of Maturín (1994–2002); President of the Venezuelan Episcopal Conference (2012–18); Apostolic Administrator of Barcelona (2014)

Orders
- Ordination: 4 August 1963 by José Alí Lebrún Moratinos
- Consecration: 27 May 1990 by José Alí Lebrún Moratinos
- Created cardinal: 30 September 2023 by Pope Francis
- Rank: Cardinal Priest

Personal details
- Born: Diego Rafael Padrón Sánchez; 17 May 1939 (age 87) Montalbán, Venezuela
- Education: Pontifical Gregorian University
- Coat of arms

Diego Rafael Padrón Sánchez (born 17 May 1939) is a Venezuelan prelate of the Catholic Church who served as the Archbishop of Cumaná from 2002 to 2018. Padrón was president of the Venezuelan Episcopal Conference from 2012 to 2018.

Pope Francis made him a cardinal on 30 September 2023.

== Biography ==
Diego Rafael Padrón Sánchez was born in Montalbán on 17 May 1939. He completed his high school studies in the minor seminary of Valencia and his work in philosophy and theology in the interdiocesan major seminary of Caracas. He was ordained a priest of the Diocese of Valencia on 4 August 1963.

He worked as vice-director of a high school and then as prefect of discipline, prefect of studies and teacher of the Archdiocesan Seminary of Valencia, followed by seven years of pastoral assignments. He earned the title of teacher at the National Pedagogical Institute in 1974. He spent the years from 1979 to 1983 in Rome and Jerusalem, earning a licentiate in Sacred Scripture from the Pontifical Biblical Institute in Rome. Returning to Venezuela, he was parish priest of San Diego di Alcalá near Valencia while teaching at the Seminary of Valencia and the Interdiocesan Seminary of Caracas.

Pope John Paul II appointed him titular bishop of Gisipa and auxiliary bishop of Caracas on 4 April 1990. He received his episcopal consecration on 27 May 1990 from Cardinal José Alí Lebrún Moratinos, Archbishop of Caracas.

On 7 May 1994 he was promoted to bishop of Maturín. He was installed there on 23 July.

Pope John Paul named him archbishop of Cumaná on 27 March 2002.

Padrón served two three-year terms as president of the Venezuelan Episcopal Conference from 2012 to 2018. He had served the Conference previously as president of the Commission for Laity and Youth from 1990 to 1996 and president of the Commission for Catechesis and Biblical Ministry from 1996 to 2003.

On 7 July 2017, he condemned what he say the brutal attacks against opposition deputies at the Venezuelan National Assembly a few days earlier.

Pope Francis accepted his resignation as archbishop on 24 May 2018.

On 9 July 2023, Pope Francis announced he planned to make him a cardinal at a consistory scheduled for 30 September. At that consistory he was made cardinal priest of San Gaetano.

== See also ==
- Cardinals created by Francis
