= Rougga Treasure =

Roman gold coins found in Tunisia, 1972

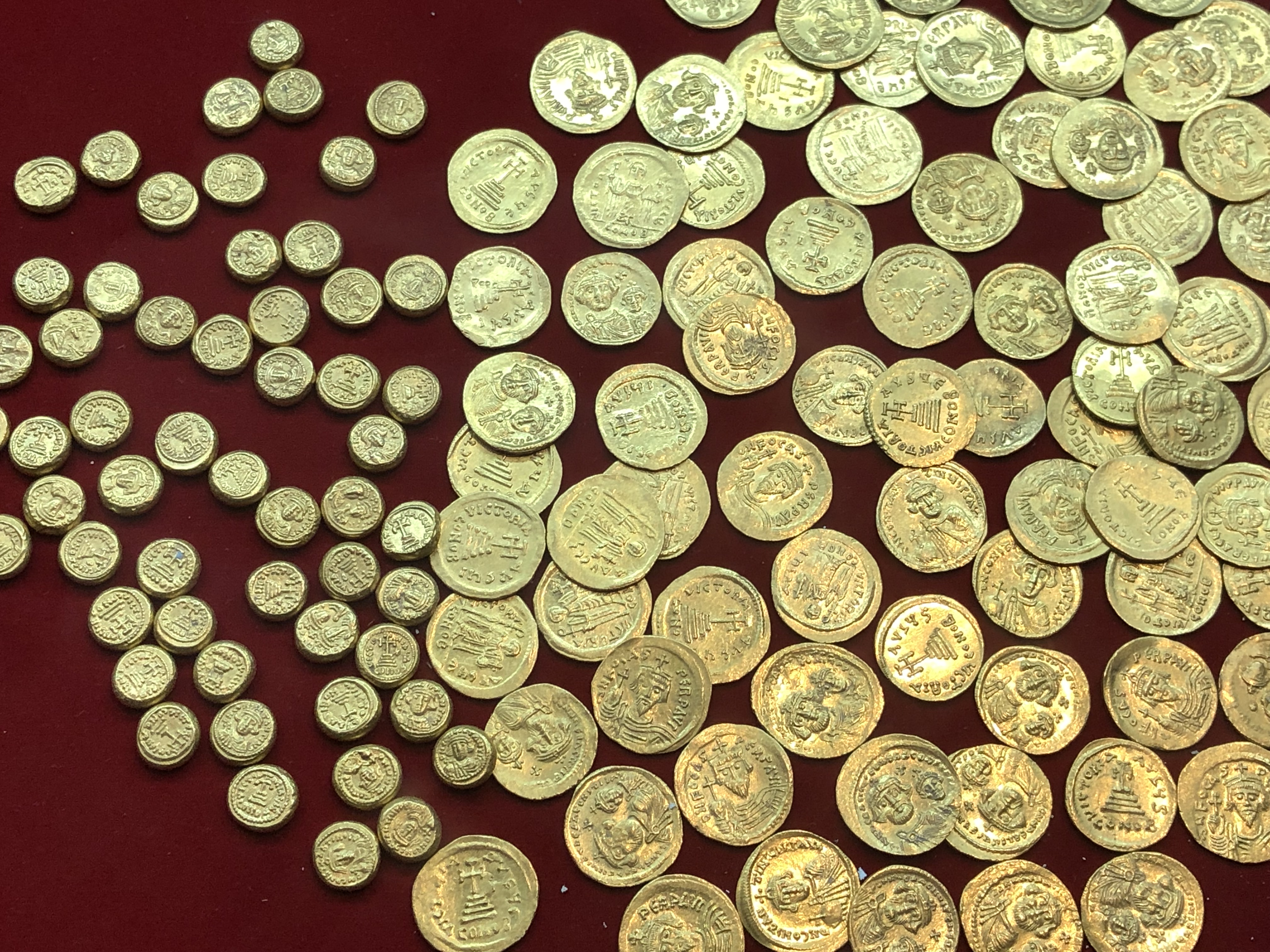
- Part of the treasure on display at the Mahdia museum.

- Type: Coins
- Material: Gold
- Discovered: 13 October 1972; Rougga
- Present location: Mahdia Museum
- Culture: Ancient Rome

The Rougga Treasure is a treasure dating back to the 7th century, discovered in Rougga, Tunisia, in 1972. Consisting of a collection of Roman gold coins, it is preserved in the Mahdia Museum.

The treasure, methodically excavated and entirely preserved, has been studied from the historical, archaeological and numismatic points of view.

Contemporaneous with the "first raid by the Muslim army" of 647, prior to the Muslim conquest of the Maghreb, this treasure, by the conditions of its discovery, its dating and the link it establishes with events cited in literary sources, is, according to Hédi Slim, "organically linked to one of the pivotal dates in the history of North Africa ".

== Location ==
The Rougga archaeological site, also known as Henchir Inchilla, is located thirteen kilometers southeast of El Djem, the ancient city of Thysdrus, and covers several hundred hectares.

It is located between Thysdrus and Usilla, on a "very bare sandy-clay plateau".

== History and rediscovery ==
=== Discovery ===
The site was excavated in 1970, and again from 1971 to 1974, by a Franco-Tunisian team.

Excavations were carried out by the National Heritage Institute (Tunisia) and the Institut d'Archéologie Méditerranéenne in Aix-en-Provence. Excavation seasons have focused on the forum, which has yielded the remains of Epipaleolithic snail farms and a Neo-Punic settlement. According to the excavators, the forum measured 85 by 56 metres, with a portico over 7 metres wide.

The treasure was discovered on 13 October 1972, in a ceramic jug concealed against the wall beneath a slab in the Rougga forum, in a cache measuring 20 centimetres in diameter and 50 centimetres deep. The pottery containing the treasure was later integrated into the El Djem archaeological repository.

The importance of the treasure is due in particular to the quality of the excavation carried out, and to the fact that it is complete, "as much [...] by its own value as by its historical significance [...] [it is] incontestably one of the most important ever found in Tunisia", as Slim put it in the early 2000s. With this archaeological discovery, "we are [...] on safe ground to study its historical contribution".

=== History ===
Byzantine Empire circa 650.

The town of Bararus municipium appears on the Peutinger Table. Prehistoric and Neo-Punic remains from the 1st and 2nd centuries BC have been found here. It is the "administrative center of the neighboring villages" and surrounded by "hamlets and rural farms". A bishop officiated at the end of the 5th century. In the 6th century, the exarchate of Carthage was reputed to be very rich, which may have whetted the appetites of would-be invaders.

The first Muslim raid in the region, in the "year 27 of the hijrah" (647 of the Gregorian calendar), fell on Sbeïtla, capital of the usurper, Patrice Gregory, but with consequences for the Thysdrus area, since "these first blows [...] paved the way for the triumph of Islam".

Archaeological evidence is invaluable, as the period was previously known mainly through later Arab historians, such as Ibn 'Abd al-Hakam, who died in 871, and others even later, dating from the 11th to the 14th century. The written sources are accused of being either too brief or full of legendary elements. For Ibn 'Abd al-Hakam, the essential thing is to recount the conquest of Egypt and elements of jurisprudence; this "tendency towards imprecision seems general". The North African and Andalusian narratives have been lost. Late texts provide much more detail than older ones, in particular the accounts of Ibn al-Athîr who, although he does not cite his sources, "offers the most plausible version of the events experienced by Tunisia at the end of the battle of Sbeïtla".

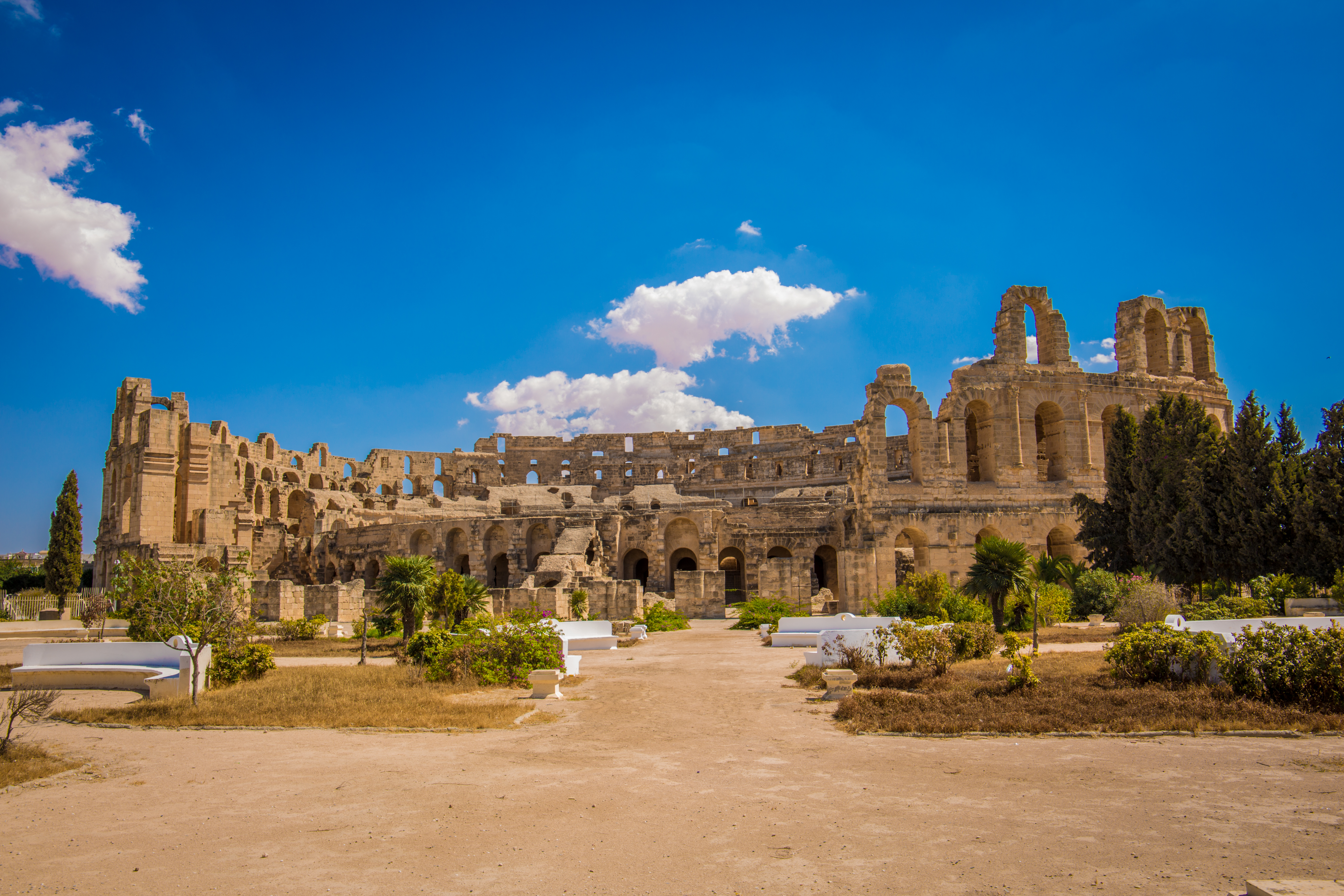
General view of the exterior of the El Jem amphitheatre.

The invaders' route is unknown, as is the location of the battle or the "areas affected by the Razzia". The invaders succeeded in taking the fortress of El Djem. The Byzantines paid tribute (2,500,000 dinars according to al-Athîr) to obtain the departure of the Arab troops, who took "a fabulous booty, witness to the immense wealth accumulated in the province". The expedition lasted "nearly fifteen months", with raids in the Gafsa region and northwest of Sbeïtla, then a renewed offensive against the Byzantine troops, whose populations were driven by "panic and panic". The amphitheatre of El Jem had been used as a defensive site, as evidenced by the ground-floor arcades "carefully sealed", and as a shelter for the "remnants of the Byzantine army and [ other ] fugitives" before whom the invaders laid siege. The Arabs, who had to cope with logistical problems such as water supply, were able to rely on the nearby Rougga cisterns, which could hold 7,600 m^{3}.

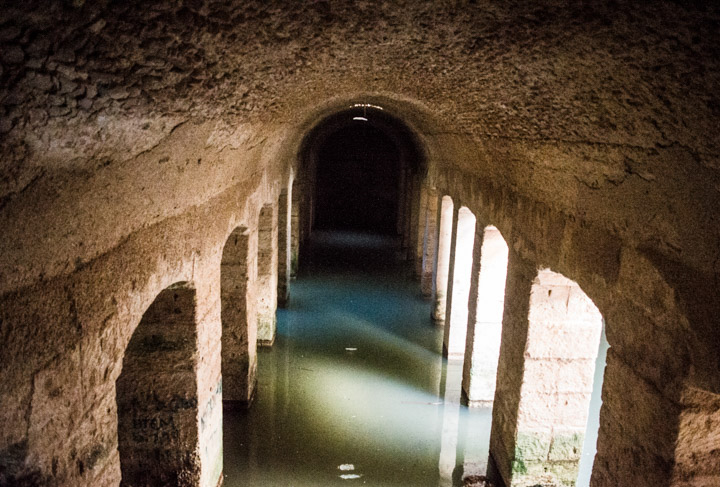
Interior view of one of Rougga's two Roman cisterns

Generally speaking, "buried treasures are [...] the reflection and illustration of the upheavals caused by serious events". Numismatic studies are helping to advance the search, but of the ten or so discoveries, the only one that is complete and whose context is known is the Rougga treasure. The treasure was buried between 647 and 648 on the site of the ancient forum of the city of Bararus, now known as Henchir Rougga.

This forum, destroyed in the Late Roman period like many of the city's buildings, was covered with rubble, and in the Byzantine period, a dwelling was built on it, fifty centimetres above the pavement. Rooms were built on the south side of the portico. The Rougga site included a Byzantine fort and the ruins of the forum; the treasure may have been buried during the raid on the city and its owner "may have been swept away by the whirlwind of events". The raid on Rougga was only one of several carried out in the region, and testifies to the weakness of the Byzantine defense system and, ultimately, to the tribute paid.

== Description ==
=== General description ===
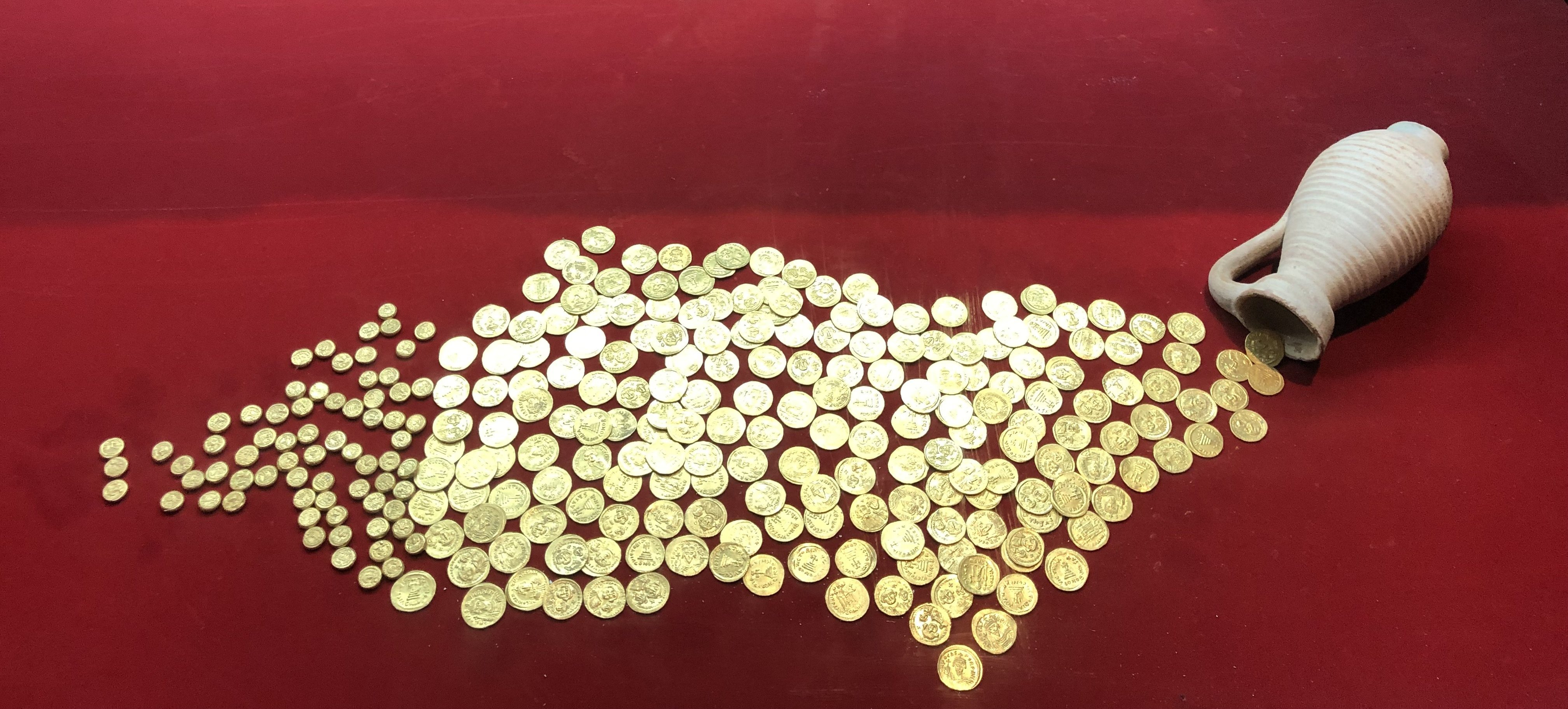
Presentation of the treasure with the ceramic jug that contained it. On the left, small-diameter globular solidi.

The treasure was found in an earthenware jug with a ceramic stopper sealed with plaster. It consists of 268 solidi coins.

The coins were minted in Constantinople (194 examples), Carthage (70 examples) and Alexandria (two examples) and weigh between 4.278 and 4.534 grams (the theoretical weight of the solidus is 4.55 grams). The total mass of the treasure is 1,185.513 grams, or 263 solidi. The difference in mass is due to spawning - wear - or to metal withdrawals, either to defraud or to adapt the coins to local economic conditions. Coins minted in Carthage are lighter, and those minted in Constantinople are of lesser numismatic quality, due to the wear caused by their circulation.

Carthaginian coins have a special globular shape, thicker and with a smaller diameter than Constantinople coins, while having the same title and nominal weight, and therefore the same value. This local manufacturing technique required less force to strike the coin, and eliminated the need for prior preparation of the planchet, resulting in less rapid wear of the coins and greater productivity for the Carthaginian workshop.

=== Composition of the treasure ===
The coins are divided between the reigns of Maurice, Phocas, Heraclius and Constans II (582–602 and 646–647), with the two most recent globules dating from the fifth indiction (1 September 646 – 31 August 647). The catalog shows great diversity (even within the different coin types) in terms of graphics and abbreviations, reflecting the political and religious relations of the time.

Emperor	Number of coins
Maurice (582–602)	1
Phocas (602–610)	83
Heraclius (610–641)	120 or 121
Constans II (641–668)	64 or 63

The Maurice coin is of a type dated 592 and issued in Constantinople. This type was produced until 602. All other coins were hoarded after this date. Saving is considered irregular, even if it continues from 602 onwards.

The number of Phocas coins is in "flagrant contradiction" with the political context preceding Heraclius' accession to power, Africa being in dissidence after the exarch 's revolt and major minting taking place in Carthage with a representation of the pretender to the throne.

Sixty-nine Heraclius coins were minted in Constantinople between 616 and 625. The first coins of the reign bear a portrait of the emperor on the obverse, accompanied by the crown prince Heraclius Constantine, and an angel or cross on the reverse.

The number of coins issued by Constans II is an indicator of the high level of activity in monetary production at the beginning of his reign, after ten to fifteen years of limited issues at the end of Heraclius' reign. The most recent coins are contemporary with the "burial of the treasure".

The most worn coins are the most recent. Over 72% of the coins are not of local origin, in contrast to other known finds, which include a large majority of Carthaginian solidi.

Coins on display (illustration images)

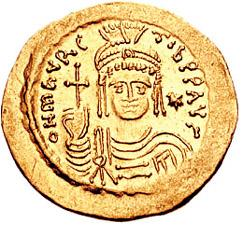
Solidus of Maurice

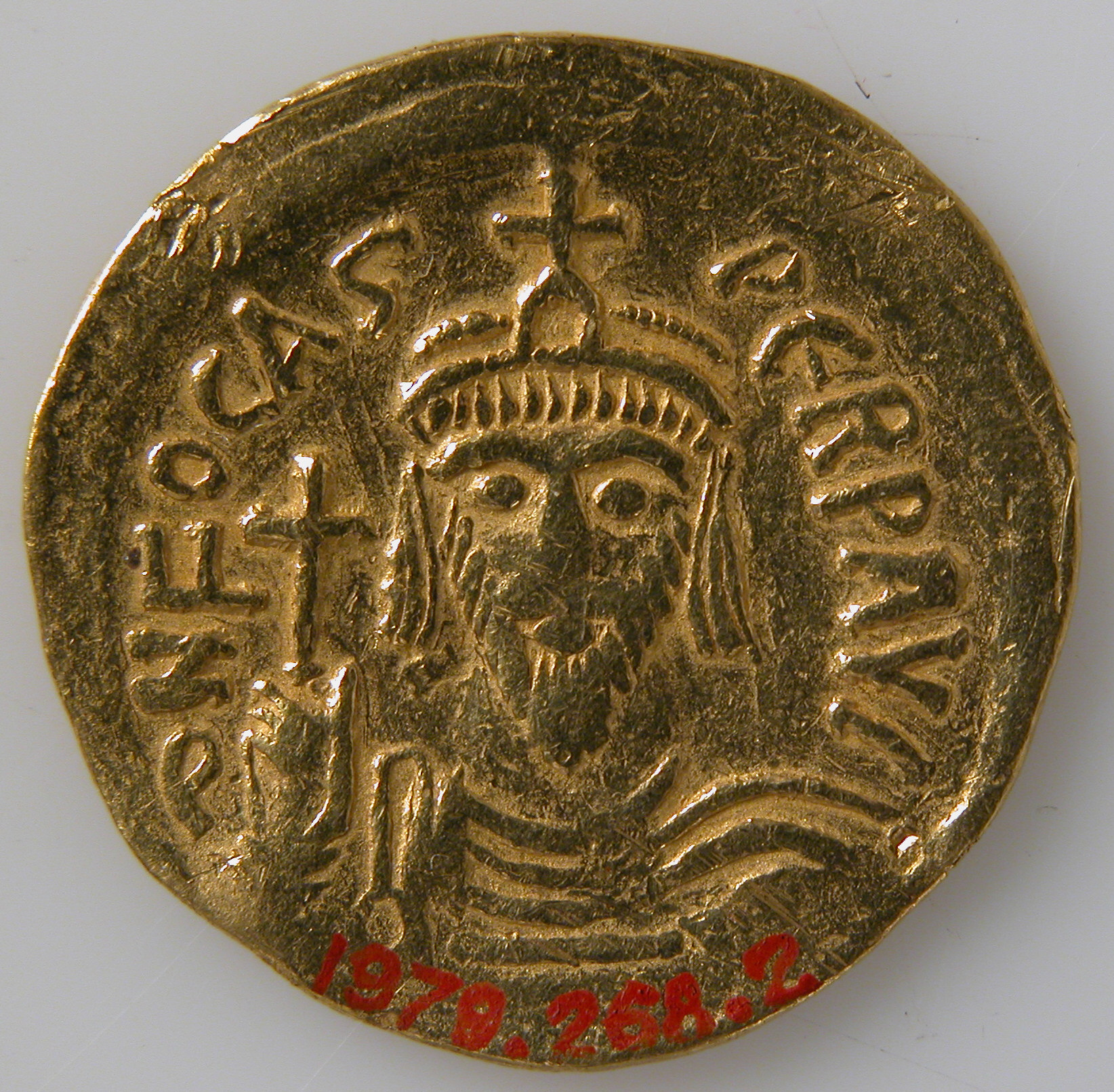
Solidus of Phocas

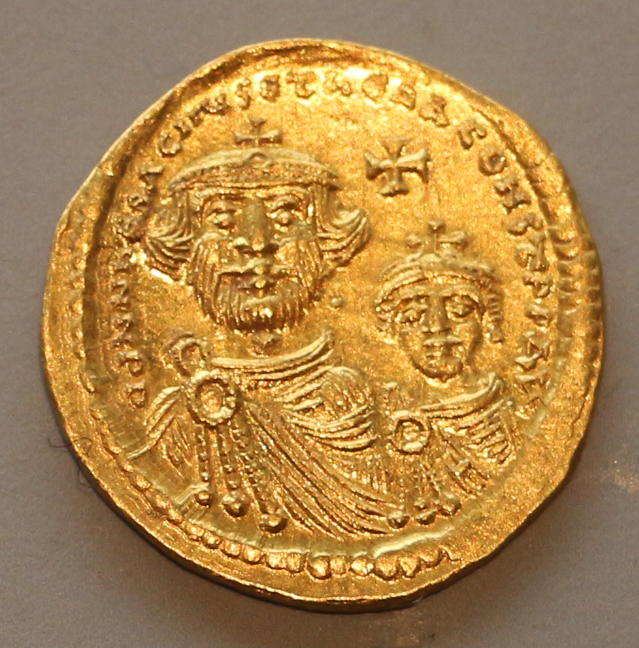
Solidus of Heraclius

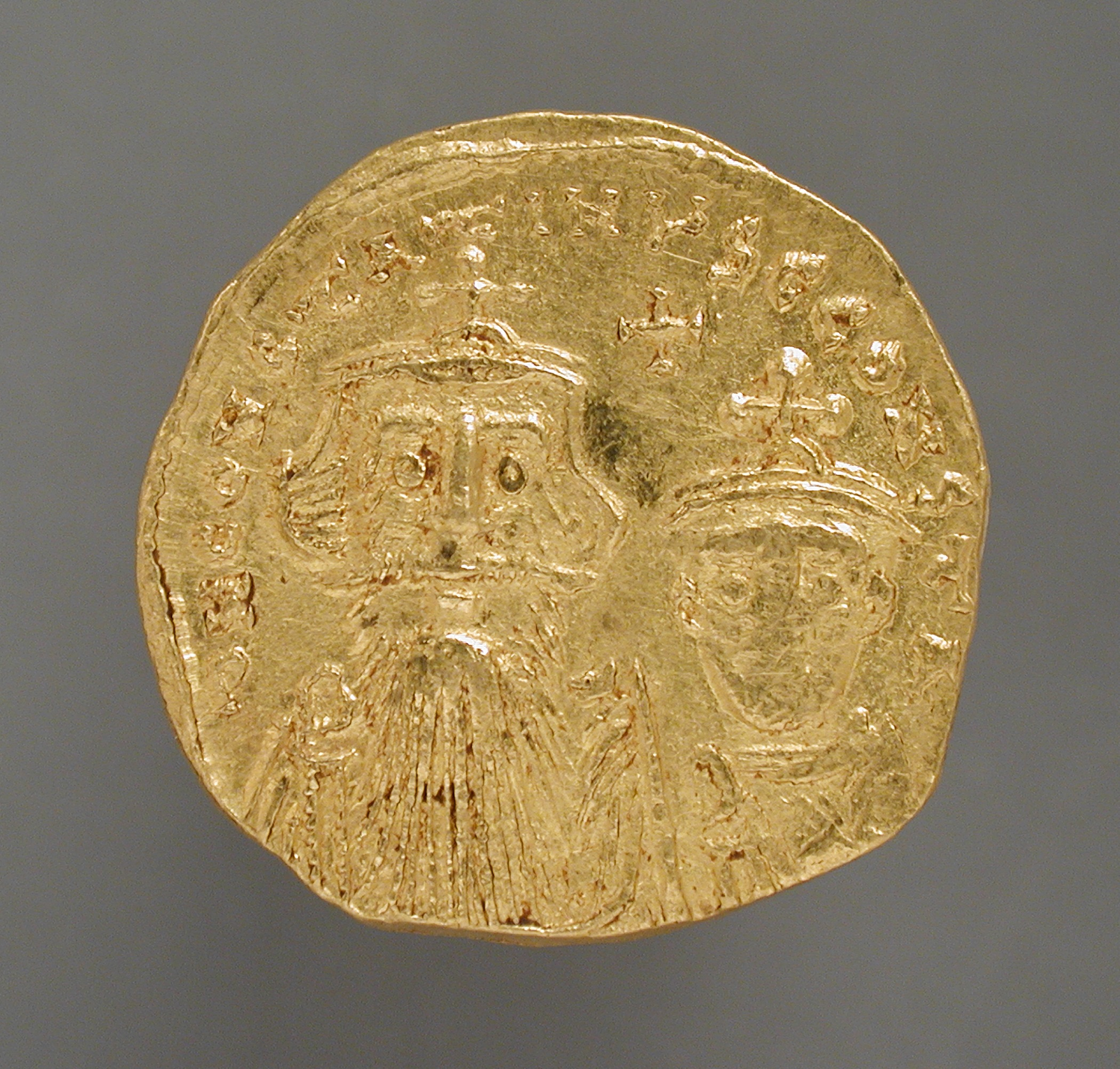
Solidus of Constant II.

== Interpretation ==
=== Verification of literary sources ===
The treasure has "considerable historical significance", with a literary tradition of the first Arab raids and archaeological confirmation of the site's abandonment.

Byzantine literary sources are very limited, while Arab sources are based on four traditions, three dating from the 7th century and the last from the 9th century, which has come down to us in its entirety.

The treasure confirms the accounts of Ibn al-Athîr and other authors, despite their short comings. It has "inestimable scientific value".

=== Reliable testimony of economic conditions in the 6th century ===
The treasure was hoarded during the last decades of the Byzantine occupation. The value of the treasure has been estimated, based on notarial documents discovered in Tébessa, at the sale price of 175 slaves or 18,410 olive trees planted on 460 hectares.

The composition of the treasure is "a precious testimony to the vitality of monetary circulation" just before the troubles that put an end to Byzantine domination in present-day Tunisia, and to the persistence of links with the empire's capital: this treasure is either the cash box of a merchant whose business was in the East, or that of a civil servant from the eastern basin of the Mediterranean, or else a cash box intended to pay soldiers. The high production of money is a sign of economic vitality and recovery at the beginning of Constans II's reign. This vitality may be linked to a rebound following the Arab advance into ancient Cyrenaica in 642 and Tripoli and Sabratha the following year.

The circumstances of the excavations are fully documented and scientifically valid: the stratigraphy is therefore reliable, in contrast to other discoveries whose conditions of discovery are poorly known and whose contents we do not know if they have completely reached us. The only other usable Byzantine discovery was made at Thuburbo Majus in 1924.

=== Testimony of the insecurity during the last decades of the Byzantine occupation ===
The date of burial, in the middle of the 6th century, confirms the tradition of an Arab expedition to Ifriqiya. The treasure confirms the "climate of endemic insecurity" and the violence of the "first great Muslim raid". The precise events are not well known.

The first Muslim raid, purely reconnaissance, took place in 645–646. The raid of 647, much more serious in its consequences, led to heavy fighting between Christians and Muslims. The Rougga treasure site is therefore contemporary with one of these first two events, dated to the "first half of 647" due to the composition of the deposit. According to Roger Guéry, the burial can be dated to the two reconnaissance phases or to the raids of 647, and was carried out in the ruins of the "final phase of the Byzantine occupation of the site".

The burial is linked to the siege of El Djem and is not "reported by ancient chroniclers". The treasure reveals "the extension of war operations to the El Jem-Rougga region". The site of the city, probably destroyed during the raid, was subsequently occupied by sedentary Berbers.

== Bibliography ==
- Delamare, François; Montmitonnet, Pierre; Morrisson, Cécile (1984). "Une approche mécanique de la frappe des monnaies : application à l'étude de l'évolution de la forme du solidus byzantin". Revue numismatique. 6 (26): 7–39.
- Guéry, Roger; Morrisson, Cécile; Slim, Hédi (1982). Recherches archéologiques franco-tunisiennes à Rougga. III. Le trésor de monnaies d'or byzantines. Rome: Publications de l'École française de Rome. ISBN 2728300437.
  - Guéry, Roger; Slim, Hédi. Introduction. In Guéry, Morrisson & Slim (1982), pp. 11-15.
  - Guéry, Roger. "Catalogue". In Guéry, Morrisson & Slim (1982), pp. 17–58.
  - Morrisson, Cécile. "Étude numismatique". In Guéry, Morrisson & Slim (1982), pp. 59–74.
  - Slim, Hédi. "Le trésor de Rougga et l'expédition musulmane de 647 en Ifrikya". In Guéry, Morrisson & Slim (1982), pp. 75–94.
- Guéry, Roger; Trousset, Pol (1991). Bararus (Rougga) », dans Gabriel Camps (dir.), Encyclopédie berbère. Vol. 9. Aix-en-Provence: Édisud. ISBN 2-85744-509-1.
- Slim, Hédi (2001). "Un trésor byzantin témoin du raid musulman de 647". Dossiers d'archéologie. novembre (268): 78–85.
- Slim, Hédi; Mahjoubi, Ammar; Belkhoja, Khaled; Ennabli, Abdelmajid (2003). Histoire générale de la Tunisie, t. I : L'Antiquité. Tunis: Maisonneuve et Larose. ISBN 2706816953.
- Slim, Hédi; Khanoussi, Mustapha (1995). "Les grandes découvertes d'époque romaine". Dossiers d'archéologie (200): 23–26. ISSN 1141-7137.
- Annuaire 1974/1975. Paris: École pratique des hautes études. 1975. ISBN 978-2-600-05334-1.
- De Carthage à Kairouan, 2000 ans d'art et d'histoire en Tunisie. Paris: Association française d'action artistique. 1982. ISBN 2865450155.

== See also ==
- Muslim conquest of the Maghreb
- Roman currency
