= Diocese of Acarigua–Araure =

Laton Catholic diocese in Venezuela

Coordinates: 9.5691°N 69.2026°W

Diocese of Acarigua–Araure Dioecesis Acariguaruensi

Catholic

Location
- Country: Venezuela
- Ecclesiastical province: Barquisimeto

Statistics
- Area: 5,510 km^{2} (2,130 sq mi)
- Population: Total; Catholics: (as of 2005); 550,000; 485,000 (88.2%)

Information
- Denomination: Catholic Church
- Sui iuris church: Latin Church
- Rite: Roman Rite
- Established: 27 December 2002 (23 years ago)
- Cathedral: Catedral de Nuestra Señora de la Corteza

Current leadership
- Pope: Leo XIV
- Bishop: Gerardo Salas Arjona
- Metropolitan Archbishop: Polito Rodríguez Méndez

The Diocese of Acarigua–Araure (Latin: Acariguaruen(sis)) is a Latin Church diocese of the Catholic Church. It is a suffragan diocese in the ecclesiastical province of Barquisimeto in Venezuela.

Its cathedral episcopal see is Catedral de Nuestra Señora de la Corteza, in the city of Acarigua.

== History ==
On 27 December 2002, Pope John Paul II established as Diocese of Acarigua – Araure, on territory split off from the Roman Catholic Diocese of Guanare.

== Episcopal ordinaries ==
- Joaquín José Morón Hidalgo (2002.12.27 – death 2013.10.30)
  - Apostolic Administrator Ramón Antonio Linares Sandoval (2013.10.31 – 2015.08.10)
- Juan Carlos Bravo Salazar (2015.08.10 – 2021.11.16), appointed Bishop of Petare
- Gerardo Salas Arjona (2022.08.22 – Present)

== See also ==
- Catholic Church in Venezuela
