= Eduardo Herrera Riera =

Catholic bishop in Venezuela

- Bishop of Carora
- Church: Catholic Church
- Diocese: Diocese of Carora
- In office: 5 July 1994 – 5 December 2003
- Predecessor: Diocese erected
- Successor: Ulises Antonio Gutiérrez Reyes
- Previous posts: Titular Bishop of Ubaza (1970-1994); Auxiliary Bishop of Barquisimeto (1970-1994); Bishop of Guanare (1966-1970); Titular Bishop of Sesta (1965-1966); Auxiliary Bishop of Cumaná (1965-1966)

Orders
- Ordination: 8 December 1955
- Consecration: 25 March 1965 by Luigi Dadaglio

Personal details
- Born: 7 September 1927 Carora, Lara, United States of Venezuela
- Died: 27 October 2012 (aged 85)

Eduardo Herrera Riera (7 September 1927 – 27 October 2012) was the Catholic bishop of the Diocese of Carora of Venezuela from 1994 until retirement in 2003.

Ordained to the priesthood in 1955, he was named Auxiliary Bishop of Cumaná in 1965, Bishop of Guanare in 1966 and Auxiliary Bishop of Barquisimeto in 1970.

He retired in 2003.
