= Roman Catholic Diocese of San Felipe =

The Roman Catholic Diocese of San Felipe may refer to:

- Roman Catholic Diocese of San Felipe, Venezuela
- Roman Catholic Diocese of San Felipe, Chile
