= Cumaná Cathedral =

Coordinates: 10.46488°N 64.17463°W

Cathedral of the Sacred Heart of Jesus
- Catedral Metropolitana de Cumaná
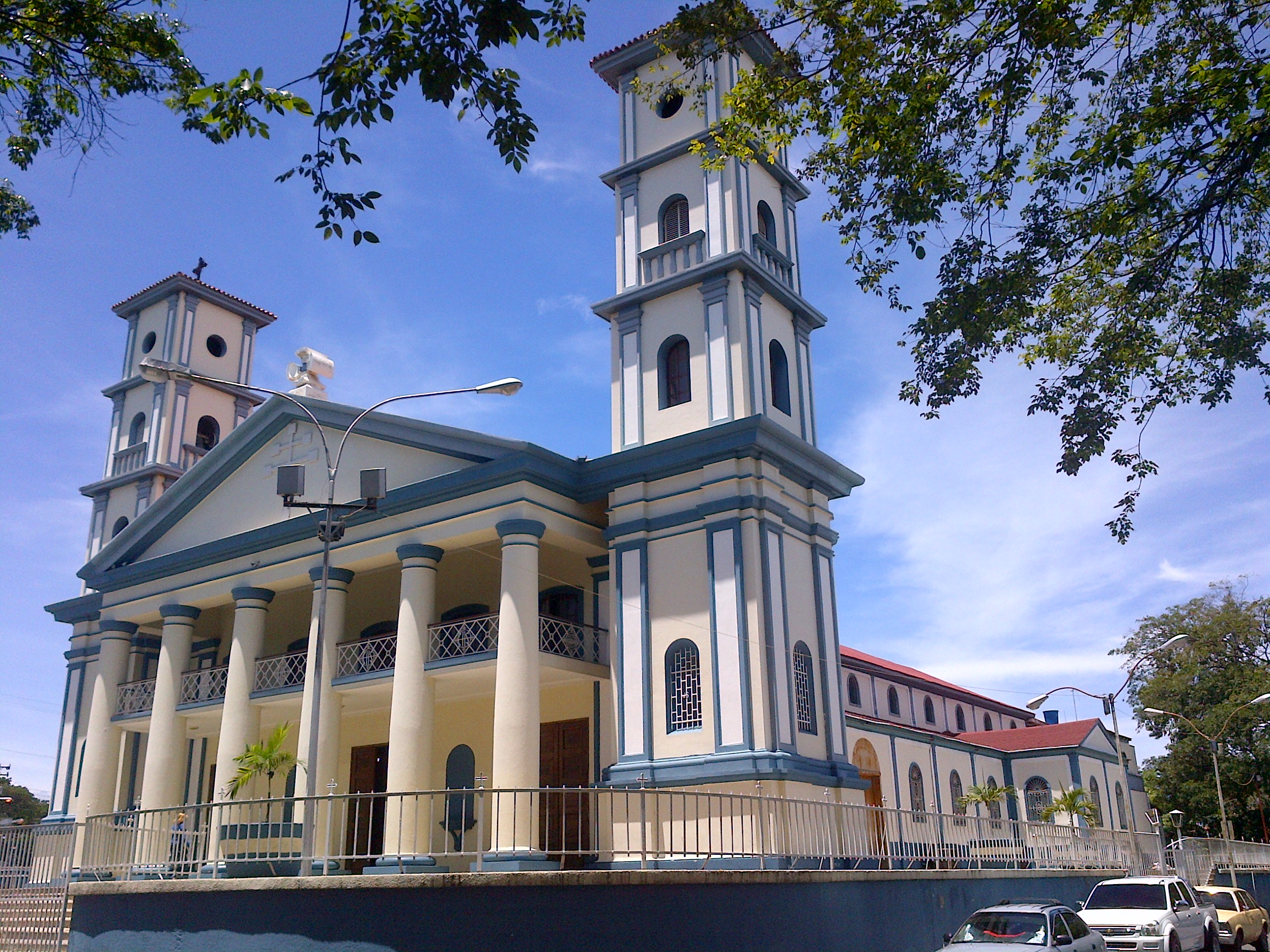
- Cathedral of the Sacred Heart of Jesus
- Location: Cumaná
- Country: Venezuela
- Denomination: Roman Catholic Church

The Cumaná Cathedral (Spanish: Catedral Metropolitana de Cumaná) also called Metropolitan Cathedral of Cumaná is a religious building belonging to the Catholic Church and is located in Rivas street opposite the Plaza Andrés Eloy Blanco, in the city of Cumaná, capital of Sucre state in northeastern of the South American country of Venezuela.

The cathedral follows the Roman or Latin rite and is the seat of the Archdiocese of Cumaná (Archidioecesis cumanensis). It was raised on May 16, 1992, by bull necessitate adducti of Pope John Paul II. The origins of this diocese date back to 1519 with the creation of the Diocese of Paria based in this city and Pedro Barbirio as bishop, which was not established until 1922.

Cumaná Cathedral began to be built in the eighteenth century with the name of Seo Cordis Iesu (English: Sacred Heart of Jesus). In 1929, an earthquake partially destroyed the building, but it was restored in 1936. It was designed by Monsignor Breckman, who also brought the woods that form the cathedral from the mountains of Cariaco.

== See also ==
- Caracas Cathedral
- List of cathedrals in Venezuela
- Roman Catholicism in Venezuela

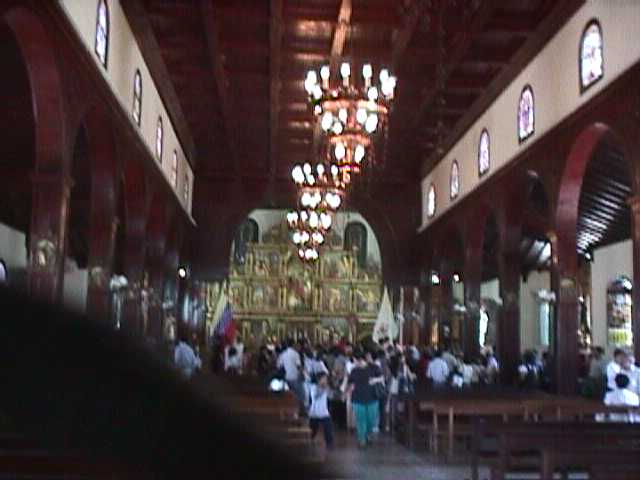
Internal View
