= Víctor Hugo Basabe =

Venezuelan Roman Catholic Prelate

His Excellency, The Most Reverend, Mons. Don. Víctor Hugo Basabe
- Metropolitan Archbishop-designate of Coro
- Church: Roman Catholic Church
- Archdiocese: Coro
- Province: Coro
- Metropolis: Coro
- Appointed: 31 October 2023
- Previous posts: Bishop of San Felipe (2016-2023); Apostolic Administrator of Barquisimeto (2018-2023)

Orders
- Ordination: 19 August 2000
- Consecration: 21 May 2016
- Rank: Metropolitan Archbishop

Personal details
- Born: Víctor Hugo Basabe; 17 December 1961 (age 64) San Carlos de Zulia, Venezuela
- Denomination: Catholic Church
- Occupation: Archbishop, Prelate
- Education: Pontifical Athenaeum Regina Apostolorum; Pontifical Lateran University

Víctor Hugo Basabe (born 17 December 1961) is a Venezuelan prelate of the Catholic Church. He has been appointed the Metropolitan Archbishop of Coro. He was consecrated a bishop in 2016 and served five years as bishop of San Felipe and then from 2018 to 2023 was apostolic administrator Barquisimeto.

== Biography ==
Víctor Hugo Basabe was born on 17 December 1961 in San Carlos de Zulia, Venezuela. He earned a degree in jurisprudence at the University of Zulia and then studied philosophy and theology at the Major Seminary of Barquisimeto. He was ordained a priest on 19 August 2000 and incardinated in San Carlos de Zulia. In Rome, he earned a licentiate in canon law from the Pontifical Lateran University and in theology from the Pontifical Athenaeum Regina Apostolorum. He has served as parish vicar, chancellor and moderator of the diocesan Curia, parish priest, and undersecretary and secretary general of the Venezuelan Episcopal Conference.

In March 2016, he was appointed bishop of San Felipe. He received his episcopal consecration in May 2016. He served from 2018 to 2023 as apostolic administrator of Barquisimeto.

Within the Venezuelan Episcopal Conference, he is a member of the Episcopal Commission for management, planning, administration and legal matters.

On 31 October 2023, Pope Francis appointed him Metropolitan Archbishop of Coro.
