= Diocese of Barcelona in Venezuela =

Latin Catholic diocese in Venezuela

Coordinates: 10.1342°N 64.6851°W

Diocese of Barcelona Dioecesis Barcinonensis in Venetiola

Location
- Country: Venezuela
- Ecclesiastical province: Cumaná

Statistics
- Area: 43,000 km^{2} (17,000 sq mi)
- Population: Total; Catholics: (as of 2006); 1,909,000; 1,785,000 (93.5%)

Information
- Rite: Latin Rite
- Established: 7 June 1954 (71 years ago)
- Cathedral: Catedral de San Cristóbal

Current leadership
- Pope: Leo XIV
- Bishop: Jorge Anibal Quintero Chacón

Map

The Roman Catholic Diocese of Barcelona in Venezuela (Latin: Dioecesis Barcinonensis in Venetiola) is located in the city of Barcelona in the ecclesiastical province of Cumaná in Venezuela.

On Thursday, 11 July 2014, the Vatican web site's online daily news bulletin, in the listing of resignations and appointments, stated that Pope Francis had appointed Bishop Jorge Anibal Quintero Chacón, who had been serving as the Bishop of the Diocese of Margarita, as the Bishop-designate of the Diocese of Barcelona.

== History ==
On 7 June 1954 Pope Pius XII established the Diocese of Barcelona from the Diocese of Ciudad Bolívar.

On 31 May 2018 from this Diocese was split off the Diocese of El Tigre by Pope Francis.

== Bishops ==
=== Ordinaries ===
- José Humberto Paparoni † (4 Oct 1954 - 1 Oct 1959)
- Angel Pérez Cisneros † (23 May 1960 - 18 Jun 1969) Appointed, Coadjutor Archbishop of Mérida
- Constantino Maradei Donato † (18 Nov 1969 - 16 Nov 1991)
- Miguel Delgado Avila, S.D.B. † (16 Nov 1991 - 21 Jun 1997)
- César Ramón Ortega Herrera (15 Jul 1998 – 20 Jan 2014)
- Jorge Anibal Quintero Chacón (11 Jul 2014 - )

=== Auxiliary bishop ===
- José Manuel Romero Barrios (2012-2018), appointed Bishop of El Tigre

== See also ==
- Catholic Church in Venezuela
