= Diocese of El Tigre =

Latin Catholic diocese in Venezuela

Diocese of El Tigre Dioecesis Tigrensis

Location
- Country: Venezuela
- Ecclesiastical province: Cumaná

Statistics
- Area: 22,978 km^{2} (8,872 sq mi)
- Population: Total: (as of 2018); 406,050
- Parishes: 14

Information
- Denomination: Catholic Church
- Sui iuris church: Latin Church
- Rite: Roman Rite
- Established: 31 May 2018 (8 years ago)
- Cathedral: Cathedral in El Tigre

Current leadership
- Pope: Leo XIV
- Bishop: José Manuel Romero Barrios

Map

The Diocese of El Tigre (Latin: Dioecesis Tigrensis) is a Latin Church diocese of the Catholic Church in the state of Anzoátegui, Venezuela. It episcopal see is the city of El Tigre. It is a suffragan diocese in the ecclesiastical province of Cumaná.

== History ==
On May 31, 2018, Pope Francis established the Diocese of El Tigre, when it was split off from the Diocese of Barcelona in Venezuela.

== Ordinaries ==
- José Manuel Romero Barrios (since 31 May 2018)

== See also ==
- Catholic Church in Venezuela
