= Zef Simoni =

Albanian priest

Zef Simoni (1 December 1928 – 21 February 2009) was an Albanian prelate of the Catholic Church who served as the auxiliary bishop of Shkodër–Pult. He was a survivor of the persecution of Catholic clergy by the People's Socialist Republic of Albania.

== Biography ==
Born to a poor family in Shkodër, Simoni was ordained a priest on 9 February 1961. He was arrested in 1967 at the time of the Albanian Cultural Revolution and imprisoned in Spaç Prison. An international symposium in May 2000 revealed the extent of the persecution, torture, and violence suffered there, which he compared to the Mauthausen concentration camp. He documented the persecutions from 1944 to 1990 in his book Martirizimi i Kishës Katolike Shqiptare (1944–1990), which was translated into Italian.

On 25 April 1993, Simoni was appointed titular bishop of Bararus and auxiliary bishop of Shkodër. The titles were bestowed personally by Pope John Paul II on Simoni and three other bishops who had survived the communist period. On January 20, 2004, the Pope allowed him to resign. He was a member of the Episcopal Conference of Albania.

== Works ==
- Martirizimi i Kishës Katolik Shqiptare (1944–1990), Shkodër 1993.
  - La persecuzione della Chiesa cattolica in Albania dal 1944 al 1990, Shkodër, "Gjergj Fishta", 2000.
- Dritat në Errësine, Persekutimi i Kishës në Shqipni, Shkodër 1994.
- Portrete Klerikësh Katolikë, Tirana 1998.
