= San Gaetano, Rome =

San Gaetano
- Church of Saint Cajetan
- Chiesa Parrocchiale di San Gaetano
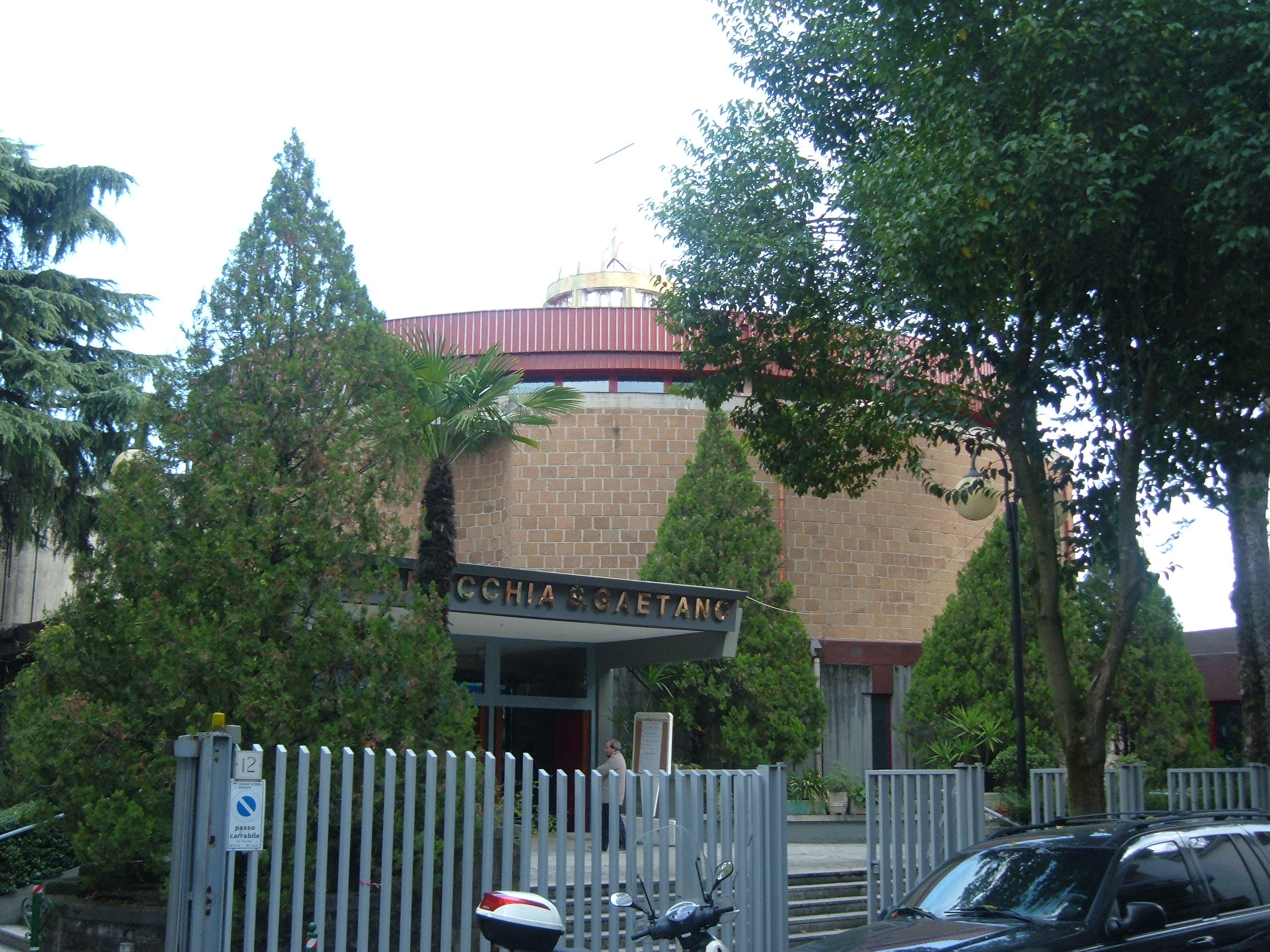

- Location within Rome
- 41°57′04″N 12°28′25″E
- Location: Via Poggio Martino 1, Tor di Quinto, Rome
- Country: Italy
- Language: Italian
- Denomination: Catholic
- Tradition: Roman Rite
- Religious order: Theatines
- Website: parrocchiasangaetanoroma.it

History
- Status: titular church, parish church
- Dedication: Saint Cajetan
- Consecrated: 22 April 1979

Architecture
- Functional status: active
- Architect: Giorgio Pacini
- Architectural type: Modern
- Years built: 1979
- Groundbreaking: 1975

Administration
- Diocese: Rome

San Gaetano is a 20th-century parochial church and titular church in northern Rome, dedicated to Saint Cajetan.

== History ==
The parish was set up in 1962 and put into the care of the Theatines, whose founder was Saint Cajetan.

The church was built in 1975–79, the architect being Giorgio Pacini. It is cylindrical in shape.

On 30 September 2023, Pope Francis made it a titular church to be held by a cardinal-priest.

Cardinal-protectors

- Diego Padrón (2023–present)
