= Rougga =

Town in southern Tunisia

Rougga is a town in southern Tunisia located in Sfax Governorate, on the Oued er Rougga wadi. Rougga is the Berber name of the town, which is known as Raqqa in Arabic. The town is located on the site of the Ancient Roman African city and former bishopric Bararus, which remains a Latin Catholic titular see.

== History ==
A veteran of this city is mentioned in a list of soldiers from Nicopolis, a Roman garrison suburb of Alexandria, Egypt, recruited in Africa province.

The city was devastated by an earthquake in 365 after which the forum appears to have been abandoned.

The 6th century was a time of great affluence for the town, with a golden solidi coin hoard testifying to this wealth. The town appears on the Roman Tabula Peutingeriana road map. By the 7th century there is evidence of fortified housing, though pottery remains indicate a continuance of occupation to the 10th century, well after the Muslim conquest of the Maghreb. The Roman town was sacked by Ibn Sa'd in 647 AD. A Berber population moved in following the Islamic conquest and used the Roman building materials for other settlements.

== Ecclesiastical history ==
The city was also the seat of an ancient bishopric, like many suffragan of the Metropolitan of Carthage, in the papal sway, and like most also destined to fade, presumably at the advent of Islam.

Its only historically documented bishop, Iulianus Vararitanus (or Bararitanus), was found on the lists of bishops in Byzacena province having attended in 484 the Council of Carthage called by Arian king Huneric of the Vandal Kingdom, after which most Catholic bishops (including him?) were exiles, unlike their schismatic Donatist colleagues.

=== Titular see ===
The diocese was nominally restored in 1933 as titular bishopric of Bararus (Latin) / Bararo (Curiate Italian) / Baraitan(us) (Latin adjective).

It was vacant since decades, having had the following incumbents, so far of the fitting Episcopal (lowest) rank:

- Johannes Baptist Filzer (1927.02.18 – death 1962.07.13) as Auxiliary Bishop of Archdiocese of Salzburg (Austria) (1927.02.18 – 1962.07.13)
- Bernardo José Bueno Miele (1962.11.22 – 1967.01.25) as Auxiliary Bishop of Archdiocese of Campinas (Brazil) (1962.11.22 – 1967.01.25); next Titular Archbishop of Uppenna (1967.01.25 – 1972.07.12) as Coadjutor Archbishop of Ribeirão Preto (Brazil) (1967.01.25 – 1972.07.12), succeeding as Metropolitan Archbishop of Ribeirão Preto (1972.07.12 – death 1981.12.22)
- Damián Nicolau Roig, Third Order Regular Franciscans (T.O.R.) (born Spain) (1967.04.08 – resigned 1977.11.25) while first-ever Bishop-Prelate of Territorial Prelature of Huamachuco (Peru) (1963.10.23 – retired 1981.09.13), died 1998
- Michael Augustine (1978.01.30 – 1981.06.19) as Auxiliary Bishop of Archdiocese of Madras and Mylapore (India) (1978.01.30 – 1981.06.19); next Bishop of Vellore (India) (1981.06.19 – 1992.02.18), Metropolitan Archbishop of Pondicherry and Cuddalore (India) (1992.02.18 – retired 2004.06.10)
- Nelson Antonio Martínez Rust (1982.01.08 – 1992.02.29) as Auxiliary Bishop of Archdiocese of Valencia in Venezuela (Venezuela) (1982.01.08 – 1992.02.29); later Bishop of San Felipe (Venezuela) (1992.02.29 – retired 2016.03.11)
- Zef Simoni (1992.12.25 – death 2009.02.21), first as Auxiliary Bishop of Archdiocese of Shkodrë (Albania) (1992.12.25 – retired 2004.01.20), then as emeritus
- Luis Rafael Zarama (born Colombia) (2009.07.27 – 2017.07.05) as Auxiliary Bishop of Archdiocese of Atlanta (Georgia, USA) (2009.07.27 – 2017.07.05); later Bishop of Raleigh (USA) (2017.07.05 – ...).

== Remains ==
Rougga is the site of Henchir-Ronga, which comprises numerous ruins of the Roman era. including the Bararus Amphitheatre. The layout of the Roman town "is organized around a forum dominated by two temples.... also two large semi circular Cisterns, an amphitheater set in an abandoned quarry, a theater with extensive outbuildings, and a paved domus [house] with remarkable mosaics."

The amphitheater is in modern Tunisia located at 35.211842°N 10.791201°E.

=== Theater ===
The theater is located on the opposite bank of the wadi from Bararus and is roughly oval in shape. The theater of Bararus is in bad condition, though a stage of 29½ by 30 meters is still discernible. The overall size of the arena was 98 by 73.5 meters with seating on a radial barrel vaulting. The Arena walls were only 3 meters high and lacked a parapet. It was estimated that the arena could seat 12,100 spectators. The arena may have been unfinished.

=== Cistern ===
The underground cisterns are very large and were excavated by the French in the 20th century.

=== Inscriptions ===
Several inscriptions were found in the town, including one recording that the curator Republicae performed duties in the three cities of Thysdrus, Thaenae and Bararus.

== See also ==
- List of Catholic dioceses in Tunisia
- Oued er Rougga

== Sources and external links ==
- GCatholic - (former &) titular see

Bibliography - ecclesiastical history

- Pius Bonifacius Gams, Series episcoporum Ecclesiae Catholicae, Leipzig 1931, p. 469
- Stefano Antonio Morcelli, Africa christiana, Volume I, Brescia 1816, pp. 346–347
- Auguste Audollent, lemm 'Bararus' in Dictionnaire d'Histoire et de Géographie ecclésiastiques, vol. VI, 1932, col. 567
