= Diocese of Margarita =

Roman Catholic diocese in Venezuela

Diocese of Margarita Dioecesis Margaritensis

Catholic
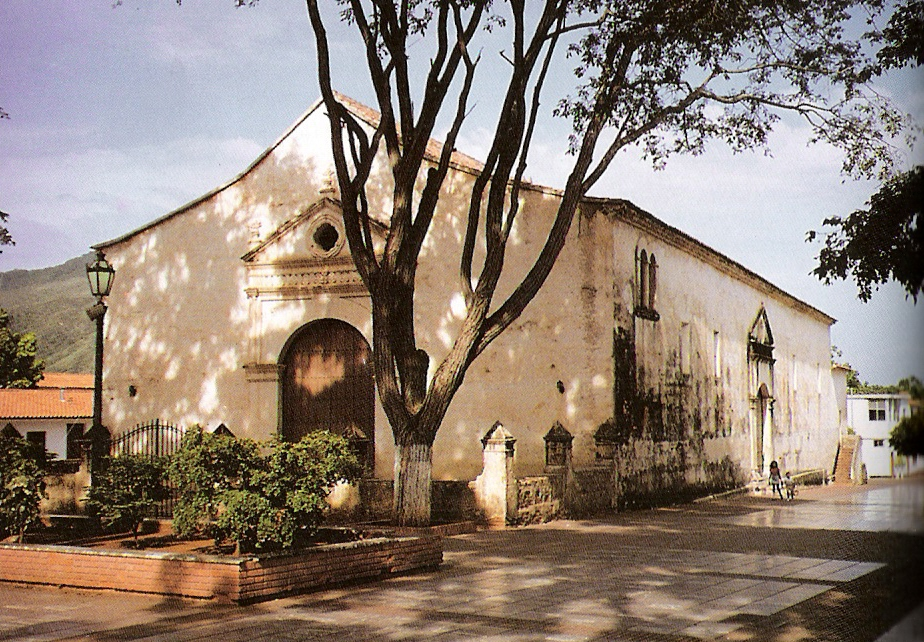

Location
- Country: Venezuela
- Ecclesiastical province: Cumaná

Statistics
- Area: 1,050 km^{2} (410 sq mi)
- Population: Total; Catholics: (as of 2004); 398,712; 335,815 (84.2%)

Information
- Rite: Latin Rite
- Established: 18 July 1969 (57 years ago)
- Cathedral: Catedral Nuestra Señora de La Asunción

Current leadership
- Pope: Leo XIV
- Bishop: Fernando José Castro Aguayo

Map

The Roman Catholic Diocese of Margarita (Latin: Dioecesis Margaritensis) is a diocese located on the island of Isla Margarita in the ecclesiastical province of Cumaná in Venezuela.

== History ==
On 18 July 1969 Pope Paul VI established the Diocese of Margarita from the Diocese of Cumaná.

== Special churches ==
- Cathedral:
  - Catedral Nuestra Señora de La Asunción
- Minor Basilicas:
  - Basílica Menor Nuestra Señora de El Valle, El Valle del Espíritu Santo

== Ordinaries ==
- Francisco de Guruceaga Iturriza † (18 Jun 1969 – 2 Oct 1973) Appointed, Bishop of La Guaira
- Tulio Manuel Chirivella Varela (5 Apr 1974 – 18 Oct 1982) Appointed, Archbishop of Barquisimeto
- César Ramón Ortega Herrera † (25 Aug 1983 – 15 Jul 1998) Appointed, Bishop of Barcelona
- Rafael Ramón Conde Alfonzo † (18 Mar 1999 – 12 Feb 2008) Appointed, Bishop of Maracay
- Jorge Anibal Quintero Chacón (19 Dec 2008 – 11 Jul 2014) Appointed, Bishop of Barcelona
- Francisco José Castro Aguayo (4 Aug 2015 – present)

== See also ==
- Roman Catholicism in Venezuela
