= Cathedral Basilica of Our Lady of Coromoto =

- Guanare Cathedral
- Basílica Catedral Nuestra Señora de Coromoto de Guanare
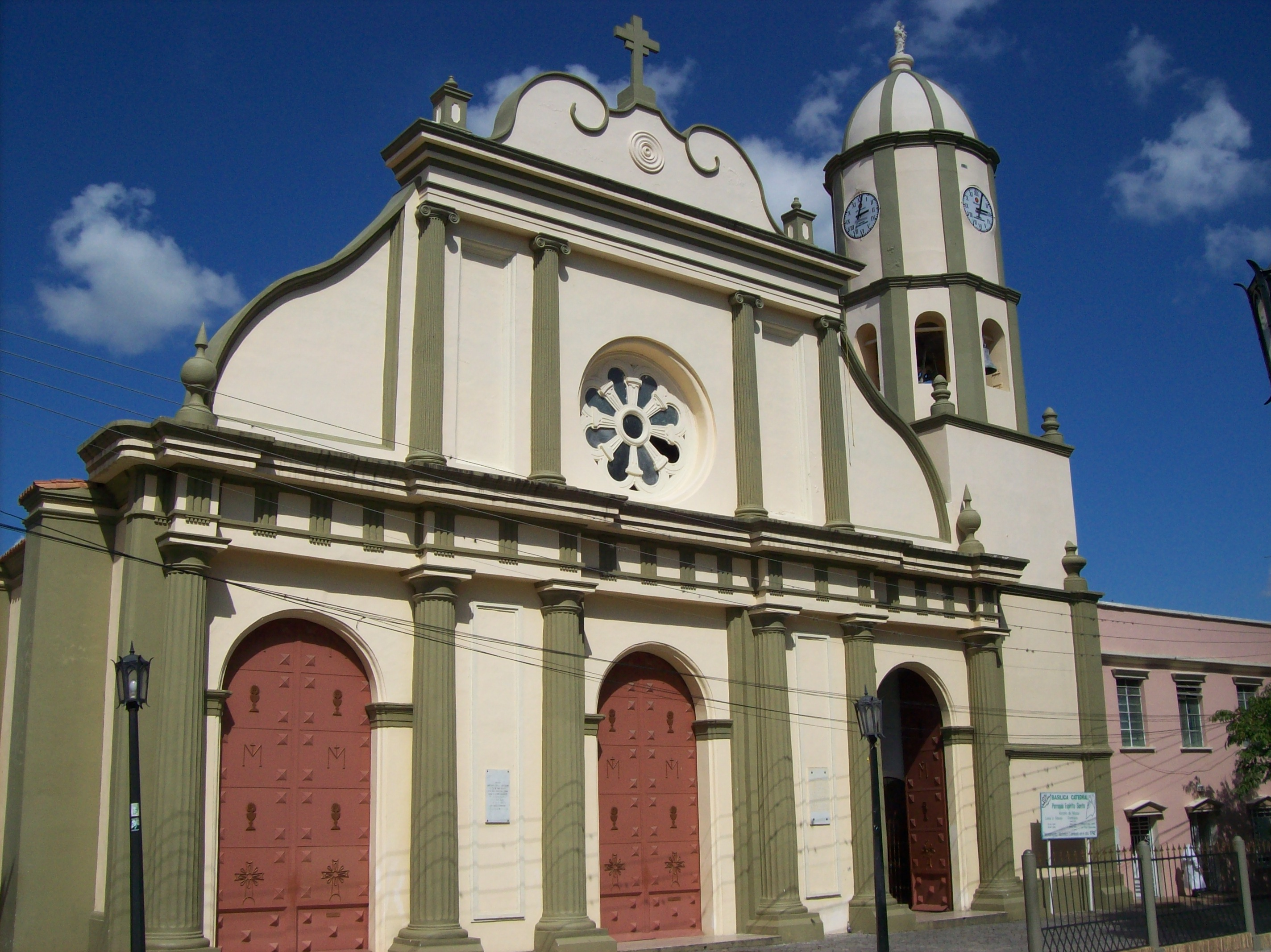
- Cathedral Basilica of Our Lady of Coromoto
- 9.0453°N 69.7504°W
- Location: Guanare
- Country: Venezuela
- Denomination: Roman Catholic Church

Administration
- Diocese: Roman Catholic Diocese of Guanare

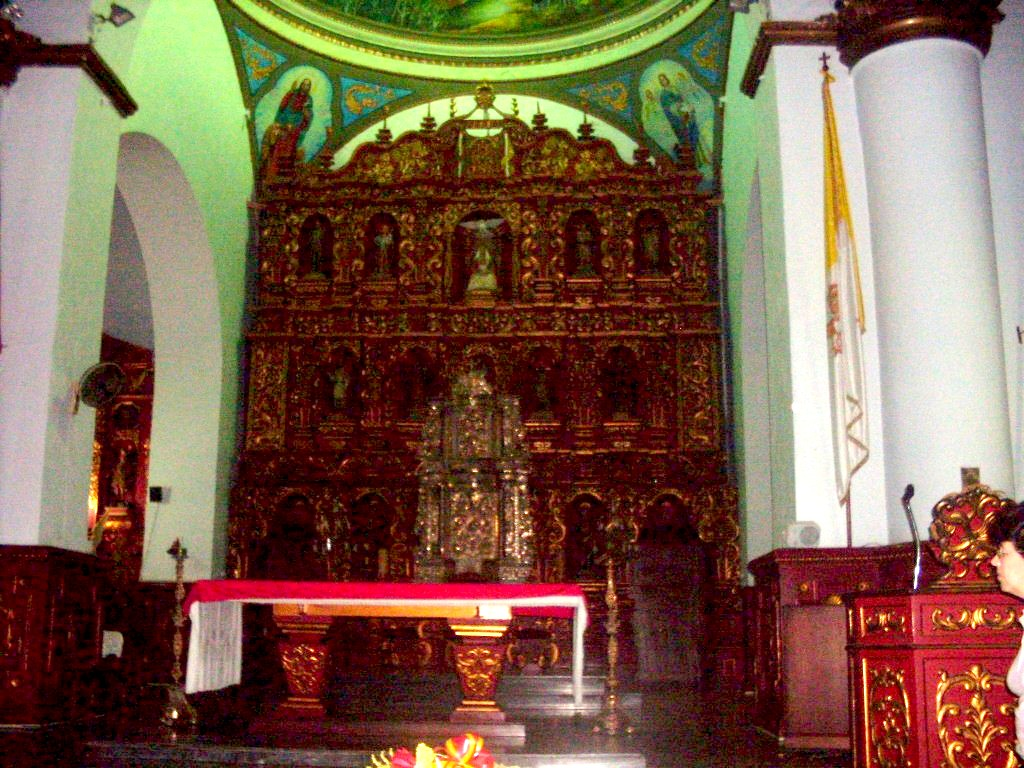
Altar

The Cathedral Basilica of Our Lady of Coromoto (Spanish: Basílica Catedral Nuestra Señora de Coromoto) or more commonly Guanare Cathedral, is an eighteenth century church dedicated to the Virgin of Coromoto and located as its name indicates in Guanare, capital of Portuguesa state in Venezuela.

The first cathedral building of certain importance of Guanare began in 1710 and was completed by Father Francisco Valenzuela in 1742. This church was short-lived as it was damaged by the earthquake of October 15, 1782 and had to be closed. Work on the reconstruction began in 1788 and ended on November 3, 1807. The cathedral was elevated to a Minor Basilica on May 24, 1949, by Pope Pius XII, and declared a historical monument under the Official Gazette No. 36,320 of 2 August 1960.

Notable features of the building include the altarpiece, baroque-colonial Churrigueresque, which was constructed by José Quiñones, as well as stained glass windows produced by X. F. Zettler in Munich.

== See also ==
- Roman Catholicism in Venezuela
- List of cathedrals in Venezuela
- Our Lady of Coromoto
