= Joaquín José Morón Hidalgo =

Venezuelan Roman Catholic bishop

- Bishop of Acarigua–Araure
- Church: Catholic Church
- Diocese: Diocese of Acarigua–Araure
- In office: 27 December 2002 – 30 October 2013
- Predecessor: Diocese erected
- Successor: Juan Carlos Bravo Salazar
- Previous post: Bishop of Valle de la Pascua (1992-2002)

Orders
- Ordination: 1 August 1965
- Consecration: 7 October 1992 by Oriano Quilici

Personal details
- Born: 16 August 1942 Boconó, Trujillo, United States of Venezuela
- Died: 30 October 2013 (aged 71)

Joaquín José Morón Hidalgo (16 August 1942 − 30 October 2013) was a Venezuelan Roman Catholic bishop.

== Career ==
Ordained to the priesthood in 1965, Morón Hidalgo was named bishop of the Diocese of Valle la da Pascua in 1992 and then was named bishop of the Diocese of Acarigua–Araure, Venezuela in 2002 and died in October 2013 while still in office.
