= Diocese of Maturín =

Roman Catholic diocese in Venezuela

Diocese of Maturín Dioecesis Maturinensis

Catholic
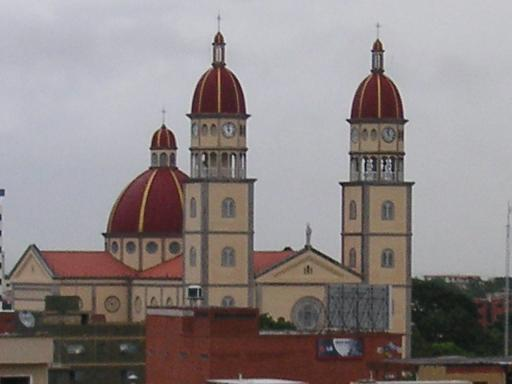
- Catedral Nuestra Señora del Carmen

Location
- Country: Venezuela
- Ecclesiastical province: Ciudad Bolívar

Statistics
- Area: 28,900 km^{2} (11,200 sq mi)
- Population: Total; Catholics: (as of 2004); 700,000; 610,000 (87.1%)

Information
- Rite: Latin Rite
- Established: 24 May 1958 (68 years ago)
- Cathedral: Catedral Nuestra Señora del Carmen

Current leadership
- Pope: Leo XIV
- Bishop: Enrique Pérez Lavado

The Roman Catholic Diocese of Maturín (Latin: Dioecesis Maturinensis) is a diocese located in the city of Maturín in the ecclesiastical province of Ciudad Bolívar in Venezuela.

== History ==
On 24 May 1958 Pope Pius XII established the Diocese of Maturín from the Diocese of Ciudad Bolívar.

== Ordinaries ==
- Antonio José Ramírez Salaverría (24 May 1958 – 7 May 1994)
- Diego Rafael Padrón Sánchez (7 May 1994 – 27 Mar 2002) Appointed, Archbishop of Cumaná
- Enrique Pérez Lavado (9 Aug 2003 – present)

== See also ==
- Roman Catholicism in Venezuela
