= Antonio José Ramírez Salaverría =

Venezuelan prelate

- Bishop of Diocese of Maturín (Emeritus)
- Church: Roman Catholic Church
- See: Diocese of Maturín
- In office: 1958–1994
- Predecessor: None
- Successor: Diego Rafael Padrón Sánchez
- Previous post(s): Priest

Orders
- Ordination: July 14, 1940

Personal details
- Born: October 7, 1917; Cariaco, Venezuela
- Died: June 28, 2014 (aged 96)

Antonio José Ramírez Salaverría (October 31, 1917 – June 28, 2014) was a Venezuelan prelate of the Roman Catholic Church. When he died at the age of 96 he was one of oldest Roman Catholic bishops and the oldest Venezuelan Catholic bishop.

Ramírez Salaverría was born in Cariaco, Venezuela and was ordained a priest on July 14, 1940, from the Archdiocese of Cumaná. On May 24, 1958, he was appointed bishop of the Diocese of Maturín and ordained bishop September 14, 1958. He remained in that position until his retirement on May 7, 1994.
