= Tor di Quinto =

Q. XVIII Tor di Quinto
- Quartiere of Rome
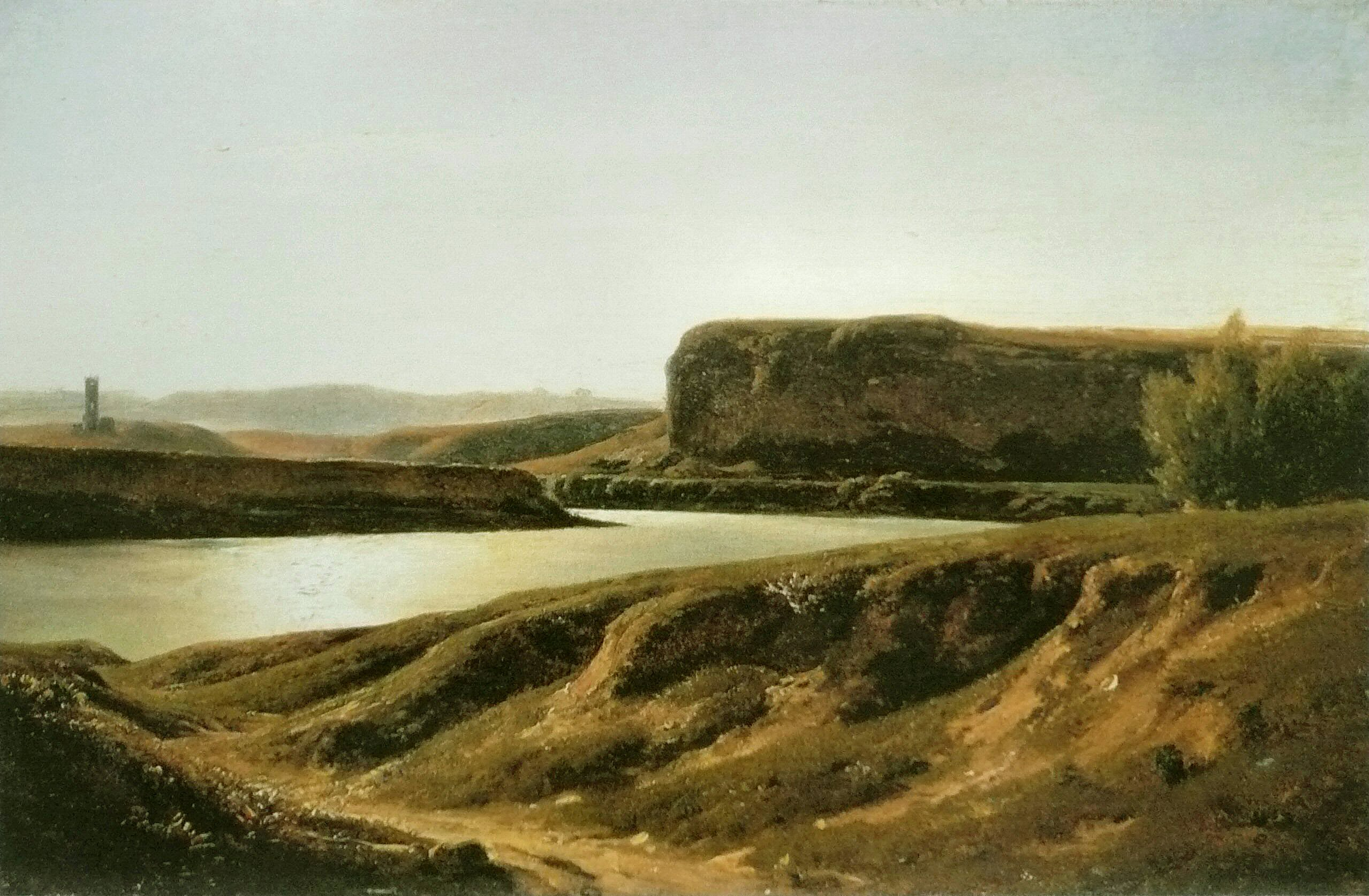
- View of the Tiber with the Torre di Quinto, André Giroux (19th c.)

- Position of the quartiere within the city of Rome
- Country: Italy
- Region: Lazio
- Metropolitan City: Rome
- Comune: Rome
- Municipio: Municipio XV
- Established: 1 March 1954

Area
  - Total: 1.89 sq mi (4.89 km^{2})
- Time zone: UTC+1 (CET)
  - Summer (DST): UTC+2 (CEST)

Tor di Quinto is the 18th quartiere of Rome (Italy), identified by the initials Q. XVIII. It belongs to the Municipio XV.

== Geography ==
=== Boundaries ===
Northward, the quartiere borders with suburbio Tor di Quinto (S. I) and with the zone Grottarossa (Z. LVI).

Eastward, it borders with the zona Val Melaina (Z. I).

Southward, it borders with the quartiere Parioli (Q. II).

Westward, it borders with the quartiere Flaminio (Q. XV).

=== Churches ===
- San Gaetano
