= Diocese of Carora =

Latin Catholic diocese in Venezuela

Coordinates: 10.1807°N 70.0881°W

Diocese of Carora Dioecesis Carorensis

Catholic

Location
- Country: Venezuela
- Ecclesiastical province: Barquisimeto

Statistics
- Area: 11,708 km^{2} (4,520 sq mi)
- Population: Total; Catholics: (as of 2004); 265,712; 251,221 (94.5%)

Information
- Denomination: Catholic Church
- Sui iuris church: Latin Church
- Rite: Roman Rite
- Established: 25 July 1992 (34 years ago)
- Cathedral: St. John the Baptist Cathedral

Current leadership
- Pope: Leo XIV
- Bishop: Carlos Enrique Curiel Herrera
- Bishops emeritus: Luis Armando Tineo Rivera

Map

The Diocese of Carora (Latin: Caroren(sis)) is a Latin Church diocese of the Catholic Church located in the city of Carora in the ecclesiastical province of Barquisimeto in Venezuela. It was established with territory split from the Archdiocese of Barquisimeto on July 25, 1992.

== Ordinaries ==
- Eduardo Herrera Riera (1994-07-05 – 2003-12-05)
- Ulises Antonio Gutiérrez Reyes, O. de M. (2003-12-05 – 2011-08-27)
- Luis Armando Tineo Rivera (2013-07-23 – 2020-06-23)
- Carlos Enrique Curiel Herrera (2021.03.30 – ...)

== See also ==
- Catholic Church in Venezuela
