= Oued er Rougga =

The Oued er Rougga is a wadi in southern Tunisia that flows into Sabkhat al Jamm in the Saharan region of Tunisia. The river is at Latitude: 35°9'29.58", Longitude: 10°46'6.2" and 34 meters above sea level.
