= Mahdia Museum =

Coordinates: 35.5037°N 11.0686°E

The Mahdia Museum is a museum in Tunisia specialising in Tunisian archaeology and heritage. It is located in the city of Mahdia.

The museum collections includes Punic, Roman, Byzantine and Islamic elements and concentrates on popular traditions of central Tunisia.

The museum has extensive collections Punic, Roman and Byzantine culture of North Africa. The Mahdia Museum also has a section dedicated to underwater archaeology including the Mahdia shipwreck. The wreck is a Hellenistic period Greek merchant vessel sunk during a storm in the 1st century BC. It contained a rich cargo of works of art and architectural elements including many columns, as well as many sculptures of marble and bronze. The museum maintains strong ties to the Bardo National Museum.

The Islamic collections include works back to the 10th century, when the area was ruled by the Fatimids. The artifacts include woodworks, mosaics, stucco work, ceramics, pottery, fabrics and traditional costumes.

== Gallery ==
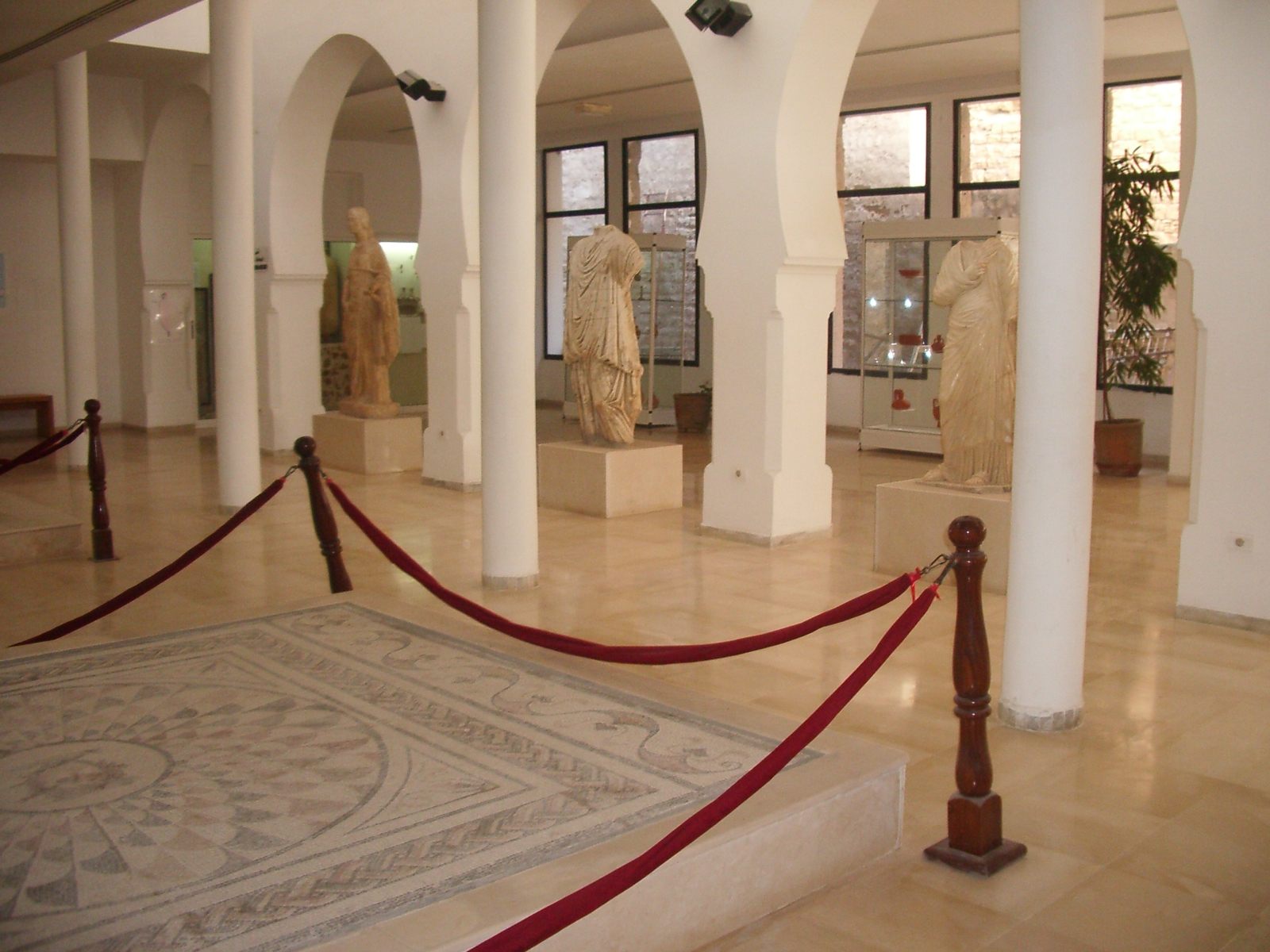
Antiquity collection

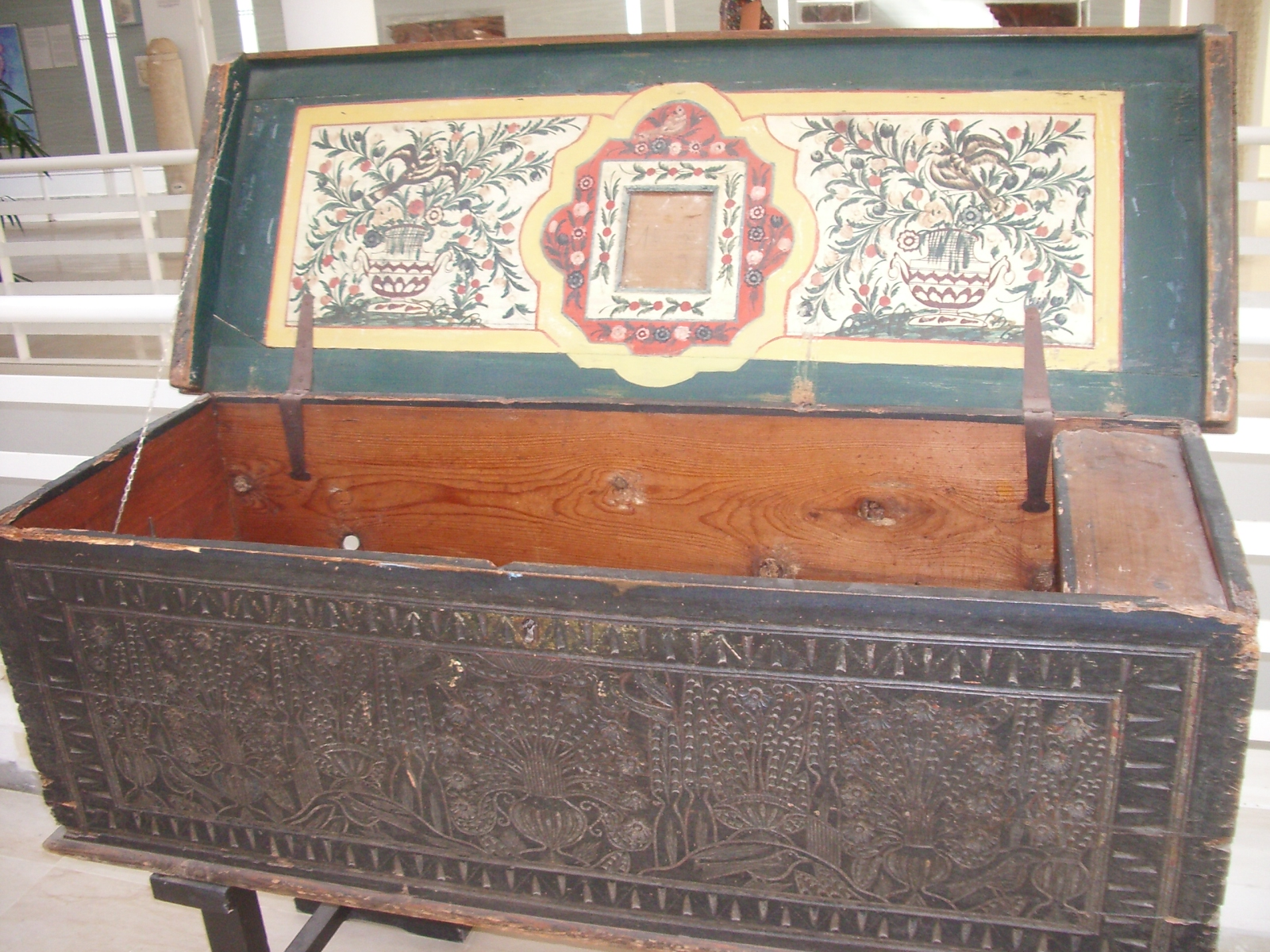
Coffre

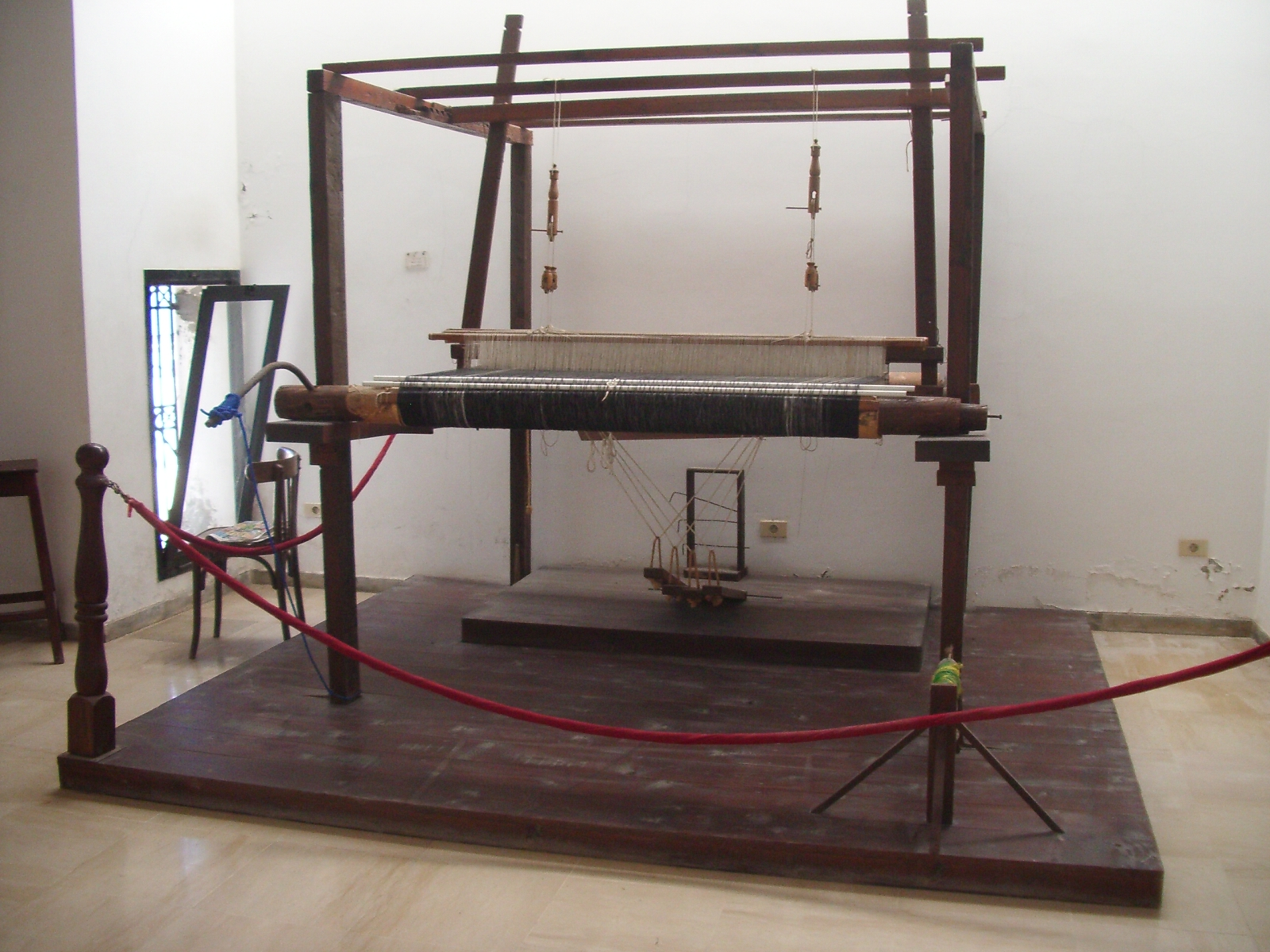
Métier à tisser (Manual loom)

== See also ==
- Mahdia shipwreck
