= César Ramón Ortega Herrera =

Venezuelan catholic priest (1938–2021)

- Bishop of Barcelona
- Church: Catholic Church
- Diocese: Diocese of Barcelona
- In office: 15 July 1998 – 20 January 2014
- Predecessor: Miguel Delgado Ávila
- Successor: Jorge Aníbal Quintero Chacón
- Previous posts: Apostolic Administrator of Barcelona (1997-1998); Bishop of Margarita (1983-1998)

Orders
- Ordination: 30 June 1963
- Consecration: 28 October 1983 by Crisanto Darío Mata Cova

Personal details
- Born: 16 July 1938 Salom (northeast of present-day Nirgua Municipality), Yaracuy, United States of Venezuela
- Died: 8 April 2021 (aged 82) Valencia, Carabobo, Venezuela

César Ramón Ortega Herrera (16 July 1938 – 8 April 2021) was a Venezuelan Roman Catholic bishop.

== Biography ==
Ortega Herrera was born in Venezuela and was ordained to the priesthood in 1963. He served as bishop of the Roman Catholic Diocese of Margarita, Venezuela, from 1983 to 1998 and as bishop of the Roman Catholic Diocese of Barcelona, Venezuela, from 1998 to 2014.

Herrera died in 2021 from COVID-19 complications aged 83.
