= Tulio Manuel Chirivella Varela =

Venezuelan priest (1932–2021)

- Archbishop of Barquisimeto
- Church: Catholic Church
- Archdiocese: Archdiocese of Barquisimeto
- In office: 18 October 1982 – 22 December 2007
- Predecessor: Críspulo Benítez Fontúrvel
- Successor: Antonio José López Castillo
- Previous post: Bishop of Margarita (1974-1982)

Orders
- Ordination: 11 November 1956
- Consecration: 9 June 1974 by José Humberto Quintero Parra

Personal details
- Born: 14 November 1932 Aguirre, Carabobo, United States of Venezuela
- Died: 10 August 2021 (aged 88) Miami, Florida, United States

Tulio Manuel Chirivella Varela (14 November 1932 – 10 April 2021) was a Venezuelan Roman Catholic archbishop.

== Biography ==
Chirivella Valera was born in Venezuela and was ordained to the priesthood in 1956. He served as bishop of the Roman Catholic Diocese of Margarita, Venezuela, from 1974 to 1982 and as archbishop of the Roman Catholic Archdiocese of Barquisimeto, Venezuela, from 1982 to 2007. He was appointed Apostolic Administrator of the Archdiocese of Maracaibo by John Paul II on June 28, 1999, a position he held until 2001.

On December 22, 2007, Pope Benedict XVI took office.

He gave up his position due to age-related reasons. Monsignor Antonio José López Castillo succeeded him. After his retirement, he settled in Miami, United States, until his death from COVID-19 on 10 April 2021, at the age of 88.
