= Archdiocese of Cumaná =

Latin Catholic archdiocese in Venezuela

Coordinates: 10.4649°N 64.1747°W

Archdiocese of Cumaná Archidioecesis Cumanensis

Catholic

Location
- Country: Venezuela

Statistics
- Area: 6,152 km^{2} (2,375 sq mi)
- Population: Total; Catholics: (as of 2006); 515,000; 489,000 (95.0%)

Information
- Denomination: Catholic Church
- Sui iuris church: Latin Church
- Rite: Roman Rite
- Established: 12 October 1922 (104 years ago)
- Cathedral: Cathedral of the Sacred Heart of Jesus

Current leadership
- Pope: Leo XIV
- Archbishop: Ángel Francisco Caraballo Fermín
- Bishops emeritus: Diego Padrón

Map

Website
- arquidiocesisdecumana.es.tl

The Archdiocese of Cumaná (Latin: Archidioecesis Cumanensis) is a Latin Church archdiocese of the Catholic Church located in the city of Cumaná in Venezuela.

== History ==
On 12 October 1922, Pope Pius XI established the Diocese of Cumaná from the Diocese of Santo Tomás de Guayana. Pope John Paul II elevated the diocese to an archdiocese on 16 May 1992.

== Bishops ==
=== Ordinaries ===
- Sixto Sosa Díaz (16 June 1923 – 29 May 1943)
- Crisanto Darío Mata Cova (21 October 1949 – 30 April 1966) appointed Archbishop of Ciudad Bolívar
- Mariano José Parra León (30 November 1966 – 12 March 1987), retired
- Alfredo José Rodríguez Figueroa (12 March 1987 – 17 September 2001)
- Diego Padrón (27 March 2002 – 24 May 2018), retired
- Jesús González de Zárate Salas (24 May 2018 – 28 June 2024), appointed Archbishop of Valencia in Venezuela
  - Apostolic Administrator Mariano José Parra Sandoval, (8 September 2024 – 3 May 2025)
- Ángel Francisco Caraballo Fermín (6 March 2025 – Present)

=== Auxiliary bishops ===
- Rafael Ignacio Arias Blanco (1937-1939), appointed Bishop of San Cristóbal de Venezuela
- Pedro Pablo Tenreiro Francia (1939-1954), appointed Bishop of Guanare
- Eduardo Herrera Riera (1965-1966), appointed Bishop of Guanare
- Manuel Felipe Díaz Sánchez (1997-2000), appointed Bishop of Carúpano

=== Other priests of this diocese who became bishops ===
- Antonio José Ramírez Salaverría, appointed Bishop of Maturín in 1958
- Tomás Enrique Márquez Gómez, appointed Auxiliary Bishop of Ciudad Bolívar in 1963
- Mariano José Parra Sandoval, appointed Bishop of San Fernando de Apure in 1994

== Suffragan dioceses ==
- Barcelona
- Carúpano
- El Tigre
- Margarita

== See also ==
- Catholic Church in Venezuela
