= Diocese of San Felipe, Venezuela =

Roman Catholic diocese in Venezuela

Diocese of San Felipe Dioecesis Sancti Philippi in Venetiola Diócesis de San Felipe

Catholic
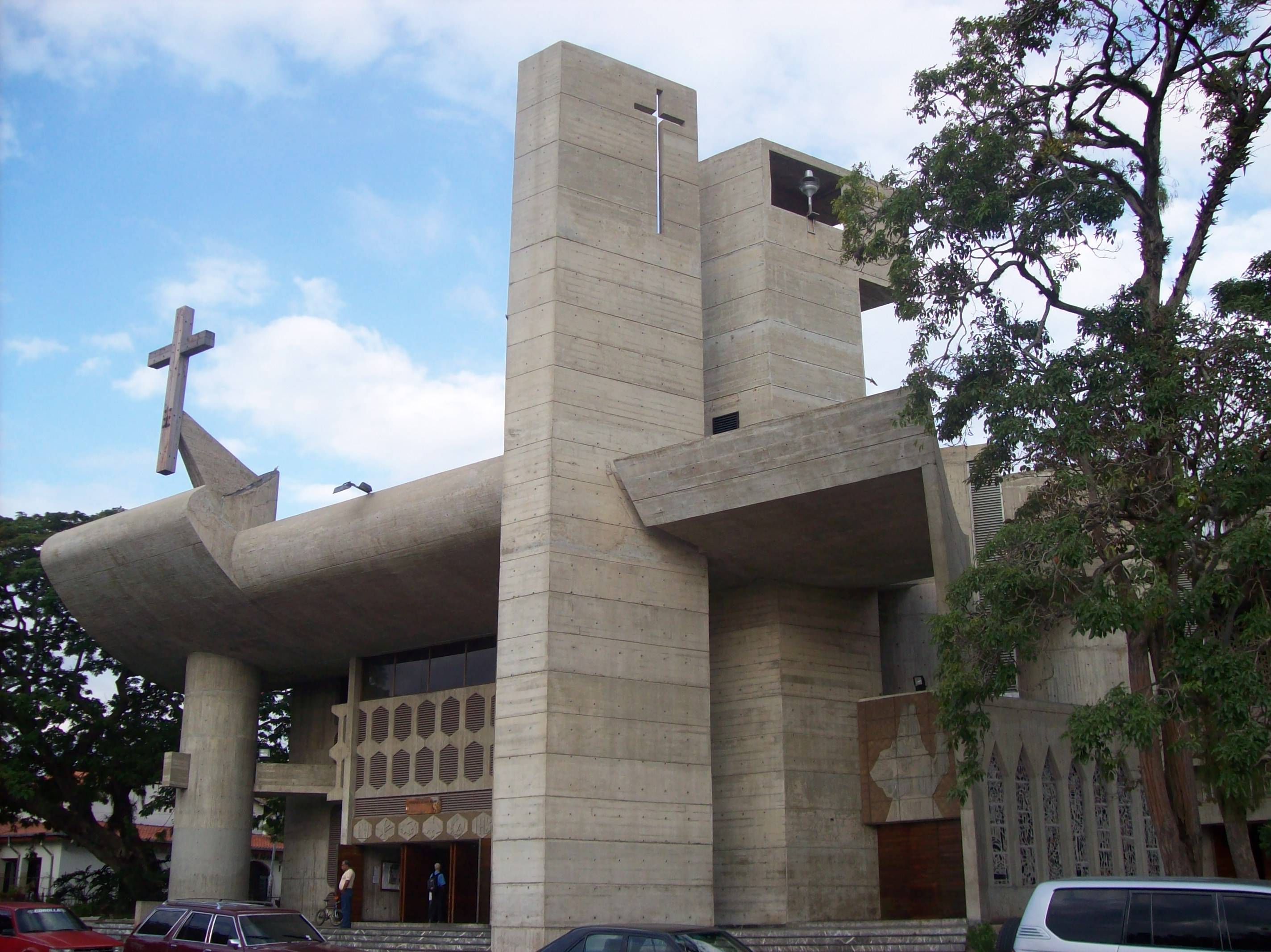
- Cathedral of St. Philip the Apostle

Location
- Country: Venezuela
- Metropolitan: Barquisimeto
- Headquarters: San Felipe, Yaracuy, Venezuela

Statistics
- Area: 7,100 km^{2} (2,700 sq mi)
- Population: Total; Catholics: (as of 2023); 647,000; 555,000 (85.8%)
- Parishes: 37

Information
- Denomination: Catholic Church
- Sui iuris church: Latin Church
- Rite: Roman Rite
- Established: 7 October 1966; 60 years ago
- Cathedral: St. Philip the Apostle Cathedral, San Felipe
- Secular priests: 35 Diocesan

Current leadership
- Pope: Leo XIV
- Bishop: Rubén Gregorio Delgado Carmona
- Metropolitan Archbishop: Polito Rodríguez Méndez

Map

The Roman Catholic Diocese of San Felipe (Latin: Dioecesis Sancti Philippi in Venetiola) is a diocese located in the city of San Felipe in the ecclesiastical province of Barquisimeto in Venezuela.

== History ==
On 7 October 1966 Pope Paul VI established as Diocese of San Felipe from the Metropolitan Archdiocese of Barquisimeto and Diocese of Valencia.

== Ordinaries ==
=== Bishops of San Felipe ===
- Tomás Enrique Márquez Gómez (30 November 1966 – 29 February 1992), retired
- Nelson Martínez Rust (29 February 1992 – 11 March 2016), resigned
- Víctor Hugo Basabe (11 March 2016 – 31 October 2013), appointed Archbishop of Coro
- Rubén Gregorio Delgado Carmona (29 November 2024 – Present)

=== Another priest of this diocese who became bishop ===
- Elieser Rivero (2003-2025), appointed Bishop of San Fernando de Apure in 2025

== See also ==
- Roman Catholicism in Venezuela
