= Diocese of Guanare =

Roman Catholic diocese in Venezuela

Diocese of Guanare Dioecesis Guanarensis

Catholic
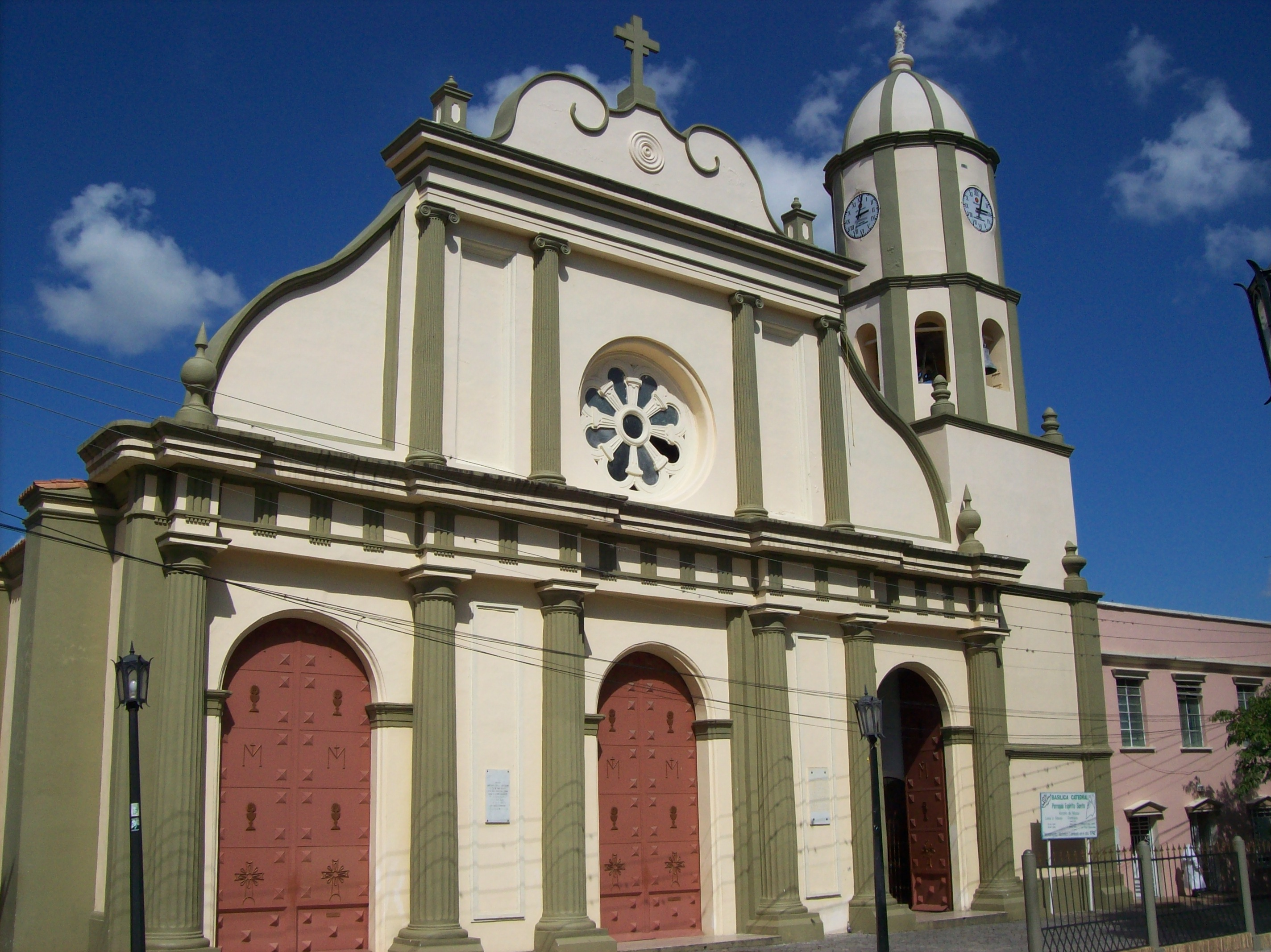
- Cathedral Basilica of Our Lady of Coromoto

Location
- Country: Venezuela
- Ecclesiastical province: Barquisimeto

Statistics
- Area: 9,710 km^{2} (3,750 sq mi)
- Population: Total; Catholics: (as of 2023); 517,630; 453,940 (87.7%)
- Parishes: 19

Information
- Denomination: Catholic Church
- Sui iuris church: Latin Church
- Rite: Roman Rite
- Established: 7 June 1954; 72 years ago
- Cathedral: Cathedral Basilica of Our Lady of Coromoto
- Secular priests: 30 (18 Diocesan, 12 Religious Orders)

Current leadership
- Pope: Leo XIV
- Bishop: Owaldo Araque Valero
- Metropolitan Archbishop: Polito Rodríguez Méndez
- Bishops emeritus: José de la Trinidad Valera

Map

The Roman Catholic Diocese of Guanare (Latin: Dioecesis Guanarensis) is a diocese located in the city of Guanare in the ecclesiastical province of Barquisimeto in Venezuela.

== History ==
- 7 June 1954: Pope Pius XII established as Diocese of Guanare from the Diocese of Barquisimeto and Diocese of Calabozo.

== Special churches ==
- Minor Basilicas:
  - Basílica Menor Santuario Nacional Nuestra Señora de Coromoto

== Ordinaries ==
- Bishops of Guanare (Roman rite), in reverse chronological order
  - Owaldo Araque Valero (2023.04.12 – Present)
  - José de la Trinidad Valera (2011.10.12 – 2023.04.12), retired
  - José Sótero Valero Ruz (2001.03.19 – 2011.10.12), retired
  - Alejandro Figueroa Medina (1995.02.21 – 2000.09.29)
  - Angel Adolfo Polachini Rodriguez (1971.03.25 – 1994.04.16), retired
  - Eduardo Herrera Riera (1966.11.30 – 1970.10.31), appointed Auxiliary Bishop of Barquisimeto
  - Pedro Pablo Tenreiro Francia (1954.10.23 – 1965.11.11), resigned

== See also ==
- Roman Catholicism in Venezuela
