= Archdiocese of Barquisimeto =

Latin Catholic archdiocese in Lara, Venezuela

Coordinates: 10.0737°N 69.3214°W

Archdiocese of Barquisimeto Archidioecesis Barquisimetensis

Catholic
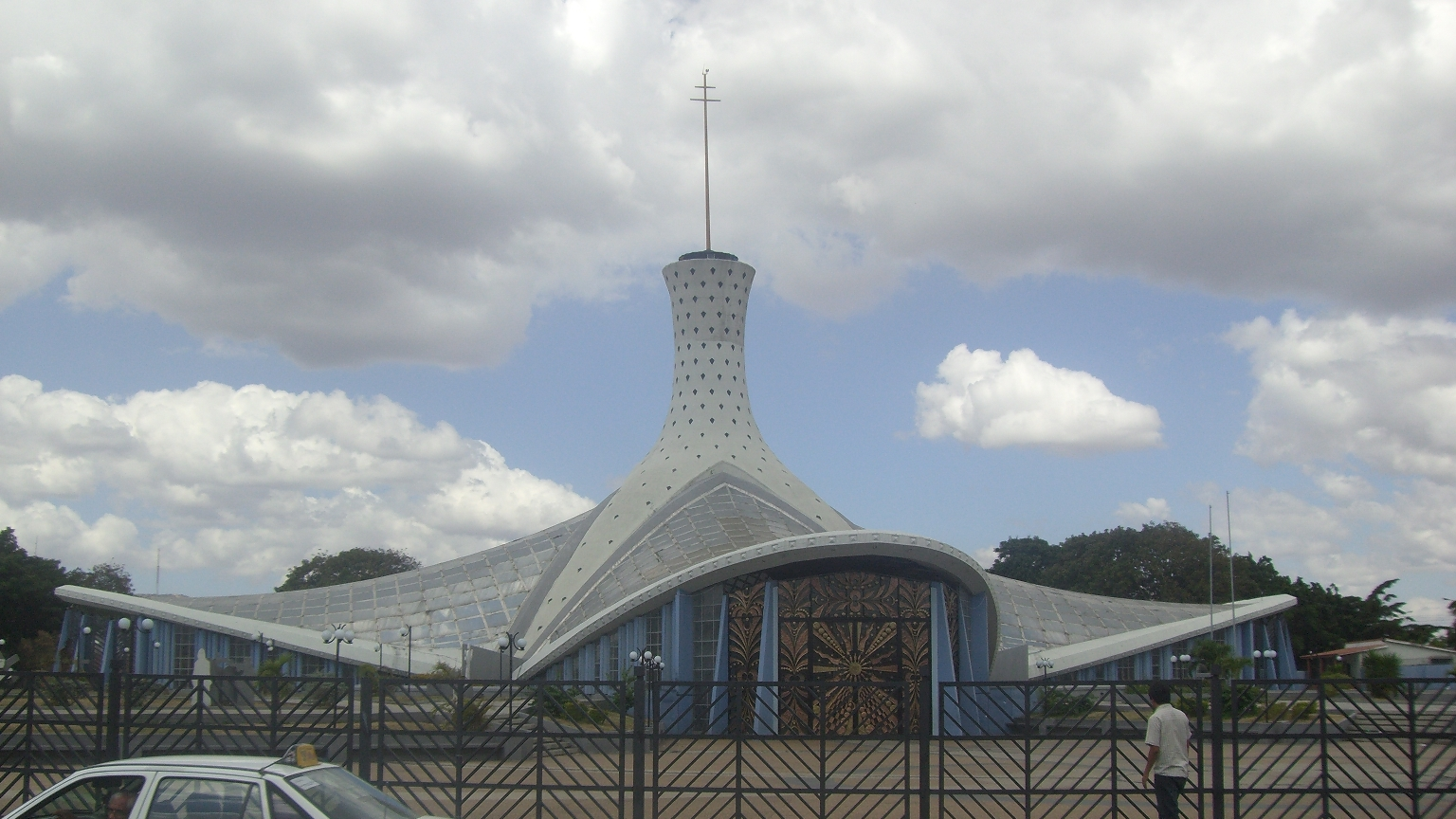
- Cathedral of Our Lady of Mount Carmel

Location
- Country: Venezuela

Statistics
- Area: 8,590 km^{2} (3,320 sq mi)
- Population: Total; Catholics: (as of 2006); 1,754,410; 1,142,504 (65.1%)

Information
- Denomination: Catholic Church
- Sui iuris church: Latin Church
- Rite: Roman Rite
- Established: 7 March 1863 (163 years ago)
- Cathedral: Cathedral of Our Lady of Mount Carmel

Current leadership
- Pope: Leo XIV
- Metropolitan Archbishop: Polito Rodríguez Méndez

The Archdiocese of Barquisimeto (Latin: Archidioecesis Barquisimetensis) is a Latin Church archdiocese of the Catholic Church in the state of Lara, Venezuela. It is a metropolitan see.

== History ==
- Established on 7 March 1863 as Diocese of Barquisimeto, on territory split off from the then Diocese of Mérida (now Metropolitan)
- Suppressed on 14 August 1867, its territory reassigned to the new, short-lived Diocese of Coro y Barquisimeto (in fact a see transfer to Coro)
- Restored on 22 October 1869 as Diocese of Barquisimeto from that (suppressed) Diocese of Coro y Barquisimeto
- Lost territory on 12 October 1922 to establish the Diocese of Coro and on 7 June 1954 to establish the Diocese of Guanare, its own suffragan
- Promoted on 30 April 1966 as Metropolitan Archdiocese of Barquisimeto.
- Lost territory again to establish two more suffragans : on 7 October 1966 the Diocese of San Felipe and on 25 July 1992 the Diocese of Carora.

== Special churches ==
Its cathedral episcopal see is the very modern Cathedral of Our Lady of Mount Carmel in Barquisimeto. There is also a Minor Basilica : Basílica el Santo Cristo de la Gracia, also in Barquisimeto.

== Bishops ==
=== Episcopal ordinaries ===
Suffragan Bishops of Barquisimeto

- Victor José Díez Navarrete (22 October 1869 – died 1893)
- Gregorio Rodríguez y Obregón (21 May 1894 – died 1900)
- Aguedo Felipe Alvarado Liscano (15 August 1910 – died 26 September 1926)
- Enrique María Dubuc Moreno (26 September 1926 – 17 November 1947), resigned
- Críspulo Benítez Fontúrvel (21 October 1949 – 30 April 1966 see below)

Metropolitan Archbishops of Barquisimeto

- Críspulo Benítez Fontúrvel (see above 30 April 1966 – 18 October 1982), retired
- Tulio Manuel Chirivella Varela (18 October 1982 – 22 December 2007), retired
- Antonio José López Castillo (22 December 2007 – 25 March 2020), retired
- Polito Rodríguez Méndez (28 June 2024 – Present)

=== Coadjutor bishop ===
- Enrique María Dubuc Moreno (1926), succeeded

=== Auxiliary bishops ===
- Marcial Augusto Ramírez Ponce (1967–1970), appointed Bishop of La Guaira
- Eduardo Herrera Riera (1970–1994), appointed Bishop of Carora
- José Luis Azuaje Ayala (1999–2006), appointed Bishop of El Vigia-San Carlos del Zulia

=== Other priest of this diocese who became bishop ===
- Manuel Felipe Díaz Sánchez, appointed Auxiliary Bishop of Cumaná in 1997

== Province ==
Its ecclesiastical province comprises the Metropolitan's own archbishopric and the following Suffragan sees:

- Diocese of Acarigua–Araure
- Roman Catholic Diocese of Carora
- Roman Catholic Diocese of Guanare
- Roman Catholic Diocese of San Felipe, Venezuela

== See also ==
- Catholic Church in Venezuela
