= Serenissima railway station =

Railway station in Rome, Italy

Serenissima
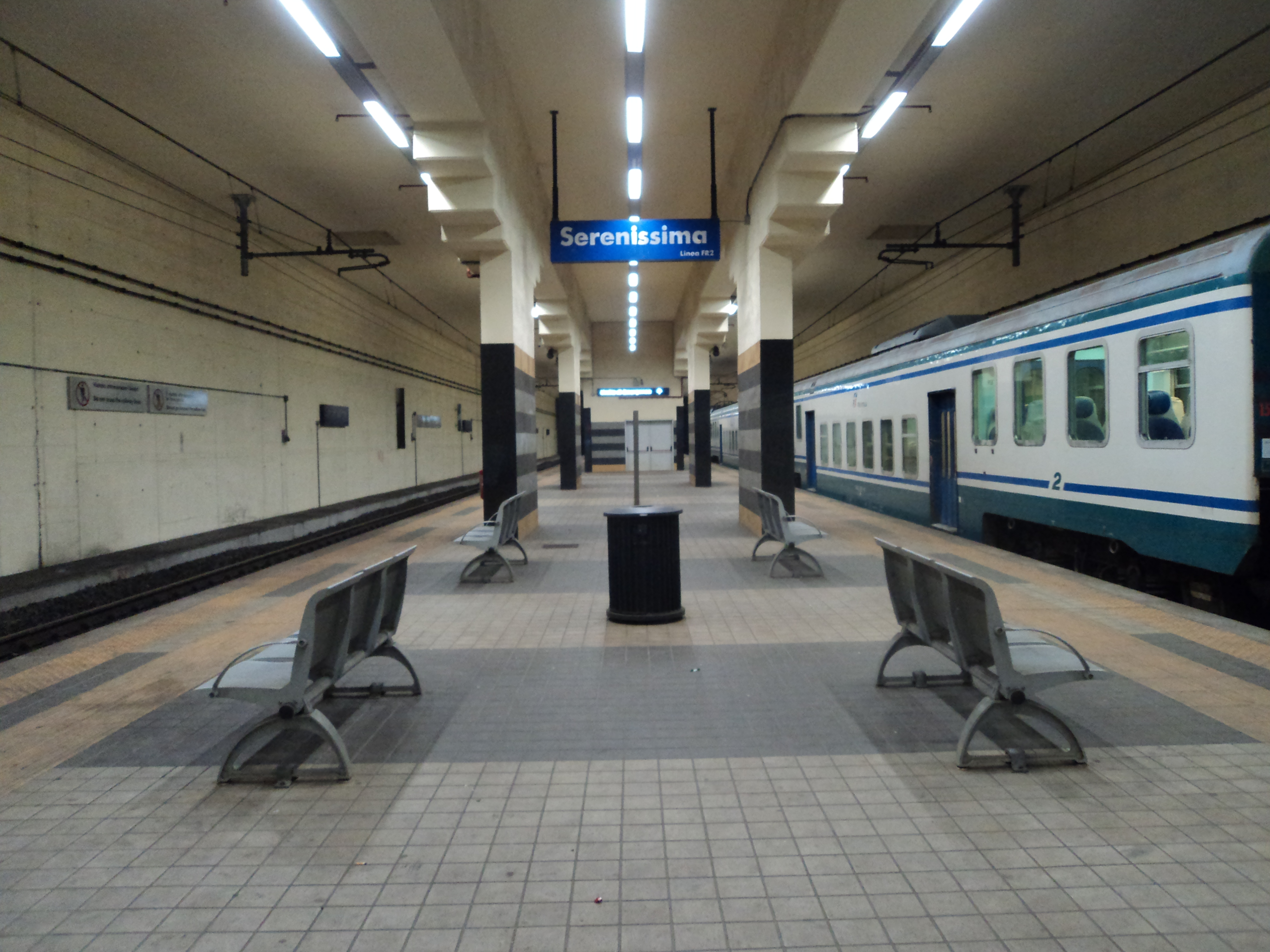
- Interior view of the underground platforms

General information
- Location: Viale della Serenissima, Rome, Italy
- Coordinates: 41°53′56″N 12°33′24″E
- System: Suburban rail halt
- Operator: Rete Ferroviaria Italiana (RFI)
- Line: Rome–Sulmona–Pescara railway
- Platforms: 2
- Tracks: 2

Other information
- Classification: Bronze

History
- Opened: 1 February 2007
Location

Serenissima railway station is a station on the Rome–Pescara railway. It is located in the Collatino district of Rome, at the point where Viale della Serenissima crosses over the railway line.

== History ==
Serenissima was constructed as part of a major infrastructure project to double the track capacity of the urban section of the Rome–Sulmona–Pescara railway between Roma Prenestina and Lunghezza. The station was designed to improve commuter access to the Collatino district of eastern Rome.

It was officially inaugurated on 1 February 2007, alongside several other new halts on the line (Tor Sapienza and La Rustica Città). Unlike traditional surface stations, Serenissima was built within an artificial tunnel (cut-and-cover) located beneath the overpass of Viale della Serenissima, from which it takes its name. The station is situated adjacent to the high-speed line (AV) to Naples, though it does not serve high-speed trains.

== Design and layout ==
The station is an underground halt featuring two side platforms. Due to its location in an artificial tunnel, the station is characterized by its modern, utilitarian concrete and steel design.

As a "Bronze" category station maintained by Rete Ferroviaria Italiana (RFI), it is designed primarily for high-frequency suburban transit. Facilities include:

- Automated ticket machines.
- Digital arrival/departure displays.
- Accessible entry via lifts and stairs to the Viale della Serenissima street level.
- A small interchange parking lot located on Via Brasiliano.

== Passenger services ==
The station is served exclusively by the FL2 (formerly FR2) regional line, operated by Trenitalia.

On weekdays, trains run approximately every 30 minutes in each direction between Roma Tiburtina and Lunghezza, with hourly services extending to Tivoli or Guidonia. During morning peak hours, the frequency increases to one train every 10–15 minutes toward Roma Tiburtina to accommodate commuters heading into the city center.

== Interchanges ==
The station serves as a local transit hub:

- Buses: Several ATAC bus lines stop directly above the station on Viale della Serenissima (notably line 542).
- Trams: The Prenestina/Tor De' Schiavi tram stop is located approximately 600 meters east of the station, providing connections to the 5, 14, and 19 tram lines toward Termini and Centocelle.

== Timetable ==
Since 9 December 2007, on weekdays there is a train every 30 minutes between Roma Tiburtina and Lunghezza and an hourly train for Guidonia Montecelio and Tivoli. During morning peak hours there is a train every 10 to 15 minutes toward Roma Tiburtina. Some regional trains to and from Avezzano also stop there.

| Preceding station | Lazio regional railways | Following station |
|---|---|---|
| Roma Prenestina towards [[ railway station|]] | FL2 | Palmiro Togliatti towards [[ railway station|]] |
