= Nomentano =

Q. V Nomentano
- Quartiere of Rome
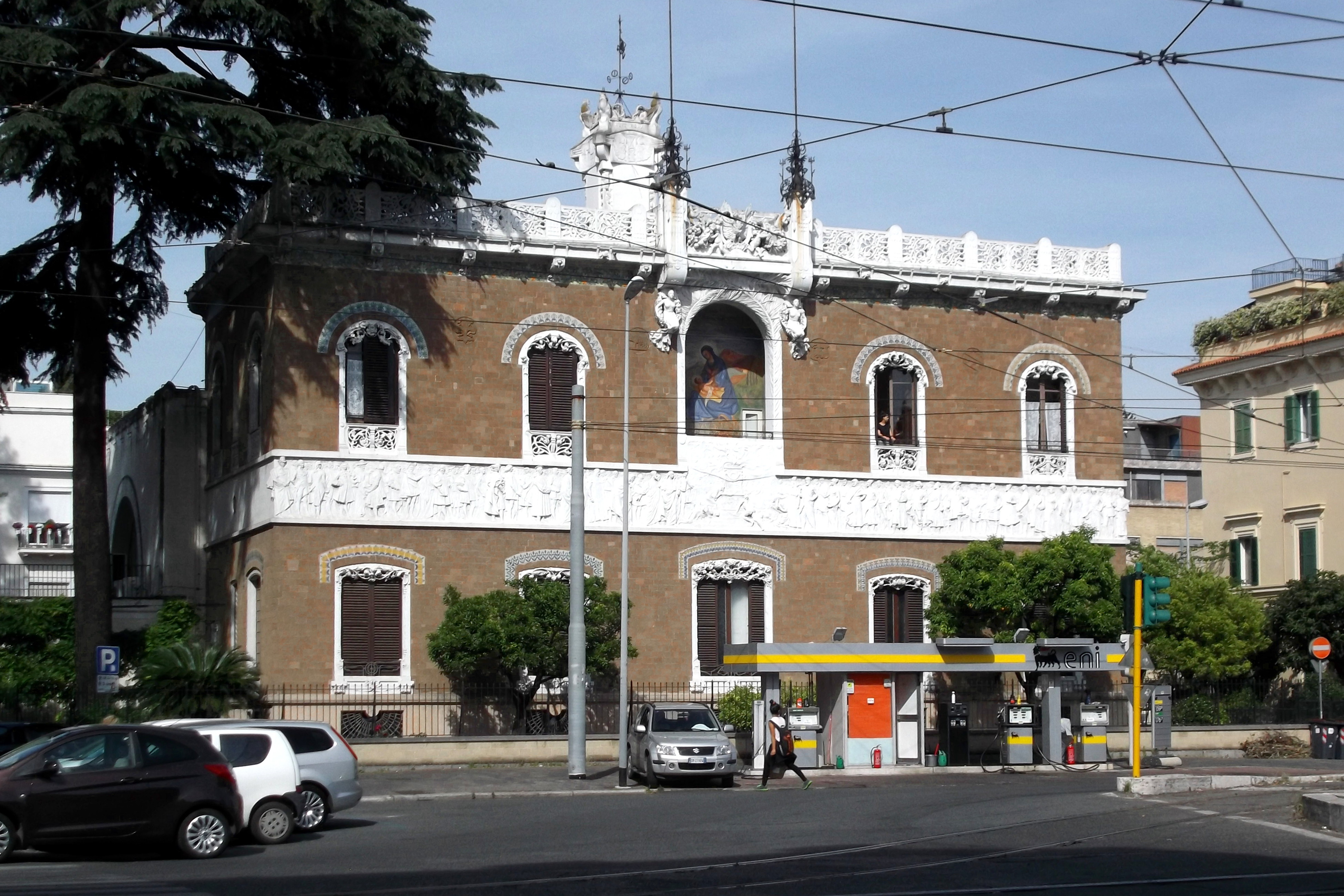
- Villino Ximenes

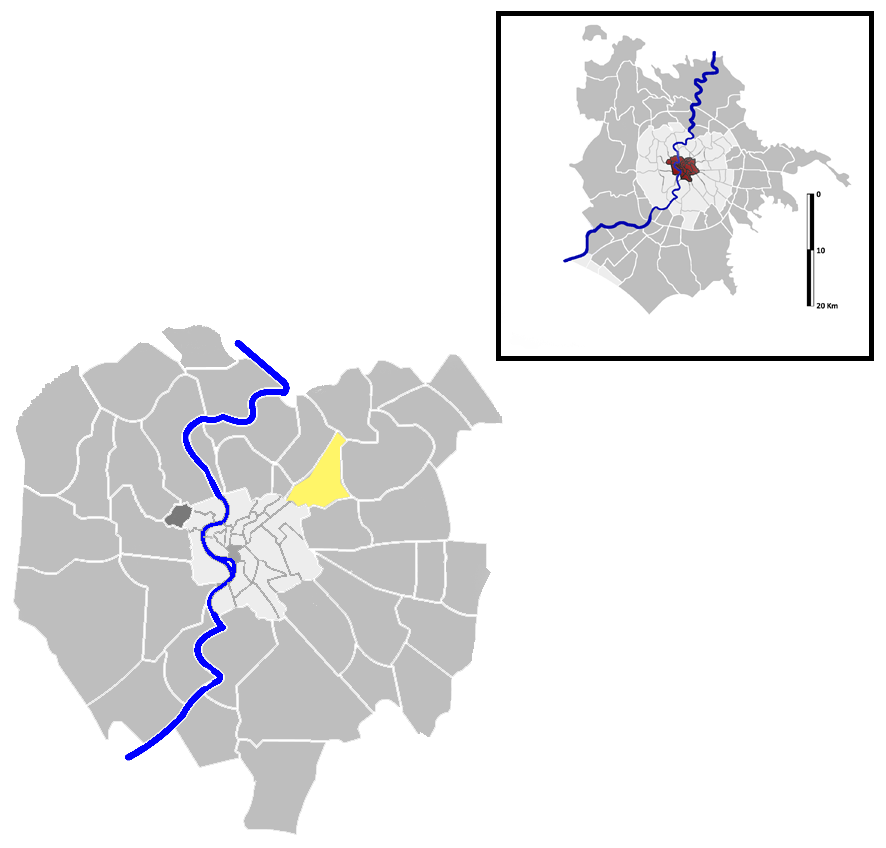
- Position of the quartiere within the city of Rome
- Country: Italy
- Region: Lazio
- Metropolitan City: Rome
- Comune: Rome
- Municipio: Municipio Roma II
- Established: 20 August 1921

Area
  - Total: 1.2591 sq mi (3.2611 km^{2})

Population (2016)
  - Total: 39,245
- Time zone: UTC+1 (CET)
  - Summer (DST): UTC+2 (CEST)

Nomentano is the 5th quartiere of Rome (Italy), identified by the initials Q. V. The name derives from the ancient road Via Nomentana. It belongs to the Municipio II.

== History ==
Nomentano is among the first 15 quarters of the city, which were born in 1911 and officially established in 1921. It took its name from the Via Nomentana.

Its construction dates back to the end of 19th century and the beginning of the 20th century: characteristic architecture of that period can be seen in the area surrounding the Policlinico Umberto I, itself completed in 1902.

The quarter rapidly developed as a residential area during the fascist ventennio and immediately after the II World War: during the latter, the area has been subject to harsh bombardments, among which the one that took place in 1944 is remembered as the third biggest air raid over Rome for its destructiveness and the number of casualties.

The quarter hosts a large Jewish community in the area around Piazza Bologna and the synagogue in Via Padova.

== Geography ==
It is located in the north-western area of the city, very close to the Aurelian Walls. The territory of the quartiere, whose shape recalls that of an irregular triangle, sits on a slight wold. It also includes the urban zone 3A Nomentano.

=== Urban planning ===
The quarter is crossed by two relevant routes, the road axis of Viale Regina Elena and Viale Regina Margherita, a rectilinear artery connecting Parioli to the Campo Verano cemetery, and the road axis of Viale del Policlinico, Via Morgagni and Viale della Lega Lombarda, linking Via Tiburtina with Porta Pia and Corso d'Italia. The bridge of Ponte Lanciani, moreover, brings in a huge traffic flow from the adjacent quarter of Pietralata.

The road system is mostly modern. Just Via Torlonia, Via de'Rossi and Via Tomassini (the roads corresponding to the ancient Vicolo di Pietralata) as well as the streets surrounding Villa Blanc belong to the original urban tissue of the early 20th century.

The area among Via Nomentana, Viale del Policlinico and Via di Villa Massimo is the elegant portion of the quarter, with refined cottages and small buildings built between 19th and 20th centuries. Just behind Viale Ventuno Aprile and Piazza Bologna, as well as along Viale delle Province, is a well-maintained council housing area dating back to the 1930s. Another pretty council housing area (the so-called Quartiere Sant'Ippolito or Tiburtino II) is located between the Via Tiburtina and the station of the same name.

It is among the smallest quarters of the city, with a moderate population density: about 75.000 inhabitants which, on average, belong to a medium-high social class. Data reveals a high aging index and a high immigration rate. Moreover, given the position of the quarter and the presence of tertiary poles and office buildings, above average levels of traffic and pollution have been observed.

=== Boundaries ===
The quarter borders:

- to the north-west, with the quarter Q. IV Salario, from which it is separated by the stretch of Via Nomentana between Piazzale di Porta Pia and Viale Regina Margherita; and with Q. XVII Trieste, whose limit is marked by the stretch of Via Nomentana between Viale Regina Margherita and the FL1 regional railway;
- to the east, with the quarter Q. XXI Pietralata, along the stretch of the Tangenziale Est between Via Nomentana and Via Tiburtina;
- to the south, with the quarter VI Tiburtino, from which it is separated by the stretch of Via Tiburtina between the Tangenziale Est and Via del Castro Laurenziano, by Via del Castro Laurenziano itself and by Viale dell'Università up until the Aurelian Walls;
- to the south-west, with the rione R. XVIII Castro Pretorio, along the stretch of the Aurelian Walls between Viale dell'Università and Piazzale di Porta Pia.

=== Odonymy ===
The majority of the streets and squares of the area around Piazza Bologna and Viale delle Province is named after Italian provinces (hence the nickname Nomentano - Italia), whilst around the Policlinico Umberto I there is a group of street named after physicians and anatomists. Other roads are named after archaeologists (mainly in the area around Villa Torlonia) and after medieval personalities or events. The odonyms of the quartiere can be categorized as follows:

- Archaeologists, e.g. Piazza Mariano Armellini, Via Costantino Corvisieri, Via Giovanni Battista de Rossi, Via Ariodante Fabretti, Piazza Domenico Gnoli, Largo and Via Rodolfo Lanciani, Piazza Orazio Marucchi, Via Famiano Nardini, Via Antonio Nibby, Via Giuseppe Vasi, Piazza Giovanni Winckelmann.

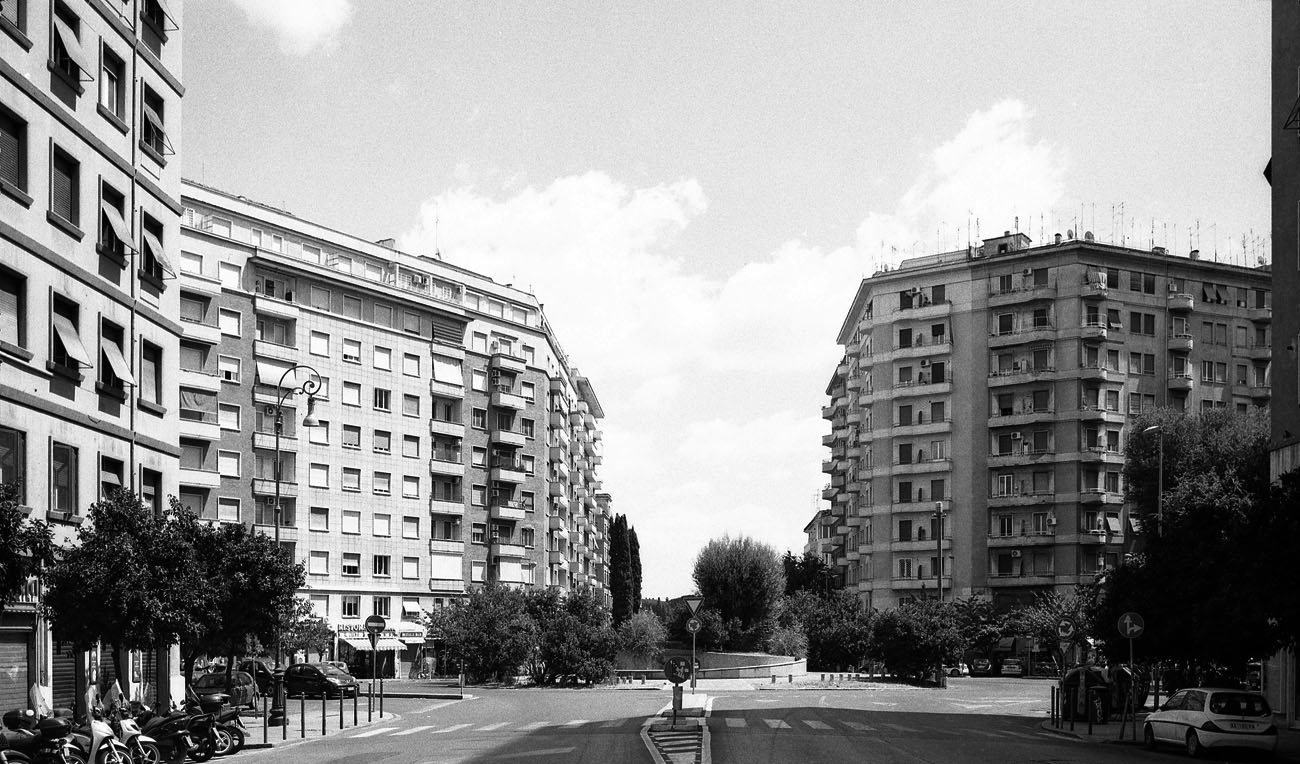
Piazzale delle Province

- Italian provinces and historical regions, e.g. Viale and Piazzale delle Province, Via Carnia, Via Catanzaro, Via Como, Via Lucca, Via Imperia, Piazza Lecce, Via Livorno, Via della Marsica, Piazza Massa Carrara, Via Padova, Via Pavia, Via Pisa, Via Ravenna, Piazza Sassari.
- Middle Age personalities and events, e.g. Piazza delle Crociate, Via Eleonora d'Arborea, Via Giovanni da Procida, Via della Lega Lombarda, Via Lorenzo il Magnifico, Largo Guido Mazzoni, Via Michele di Lando, Piazza Ruggero di Sicilia, Via Stamira, Via Teodolinda, Via Teodorico, Piazza Vespri Siciliani.
- Physicians and anatomists, e.g. Via Mondino de Luzzi, Via Gabriele Falloppio, Via Gerolamo Fracastoro, Piazza Galeno, Viale Ippocrate, Via Giovanni Maria Lancisi, Via Marcello Malpighi, Largo Ettore Marchiafava, Via Giovanni Battista Morgagni, Via Augusto Murri, Via Francesco Redi, Via Lazzaro Spallanzani, Via Andrea Vesalio, Via Paolo Zacchia.

== Places of interest ==
=== Civil buildings ===
- Villino Ximenes, in Piazza Galeno. A 20th-century liberty style cottage (1902).

designed by architect Ettore Ximenes.

- Villino Wille, in Via Andrea Cesalpino. A 20th-century cottage (1907).

designed by architect Ernst Wille.

- Biblioteca Nazionale Centrale, in Viale Castro Pretorio. Modernist building (1975).

designed by architects Massimo Castellazzi, Tullio Dell'Anese and Annibale Vitellozzi.

- Città del Sole, between Via della Lega Lombarda and Via Arduino. A 21st-century architectural complex (2010–15).

designed by Studio Labics.

=== Religious buildings ===
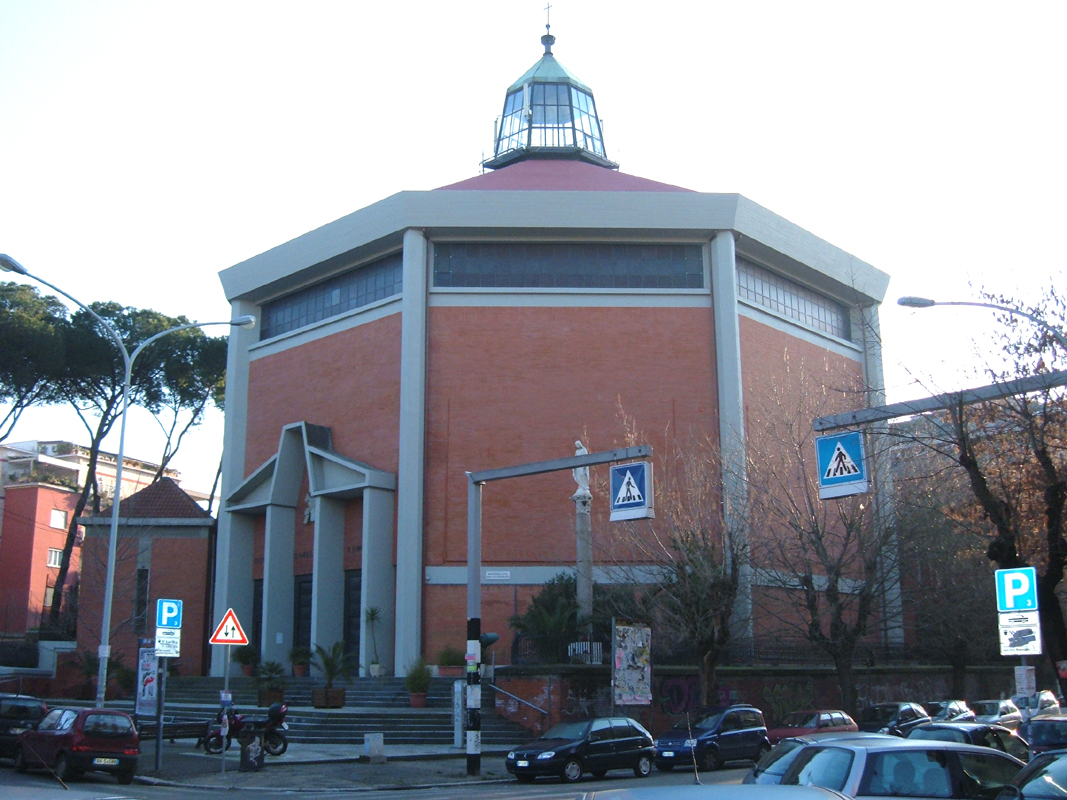
Chiesa di Sant'Angela Merici

- Church of Santa Francesca Cabrini, in Via della Marsica.
- Church of Corpus Domini, in Via Nomentana
- Church of San Giuseppe a via Nomentana
- Church of Sant'Ippolito, in Viale delle Provincie
- Church Sant'Angela Merici, in Via Bartolomeo Marliano
- Church of Sant'Orsola, in Via Livorno
- Nostra Signora del Santissimo Sacramento e Santi Martiri Canadesi, in Via Giovanni Battista De Rossi
- Church of Santi Sette Fondatori, in Via Bari
- Catacomb of San Nicomede

=== Villas ===
- Villa Torlonia, in Via Nomentana.
- Villa Mirafiori, in Via Carlo Fea (1878).
- Villa Massimo, in Largo di Villa Massimo (1913).
- Villa Blanc, in Via Nomentana.

=== Other ===
- Monument to the Guardia di Finanza fallen of the I World War, in Largo XXI Aprile (designed by Amleto Cataldi in 1930).
- Ministry of Infrastructure and Transport, in Piazzale di Porta Pia.
- Policlinico Umberto I, in Viale del Policlinico.
- Accademia Nazionale delle Scienze, inside Villa Torlonia.
