= Tiburtina (Rome Metro) =

Rome metro station

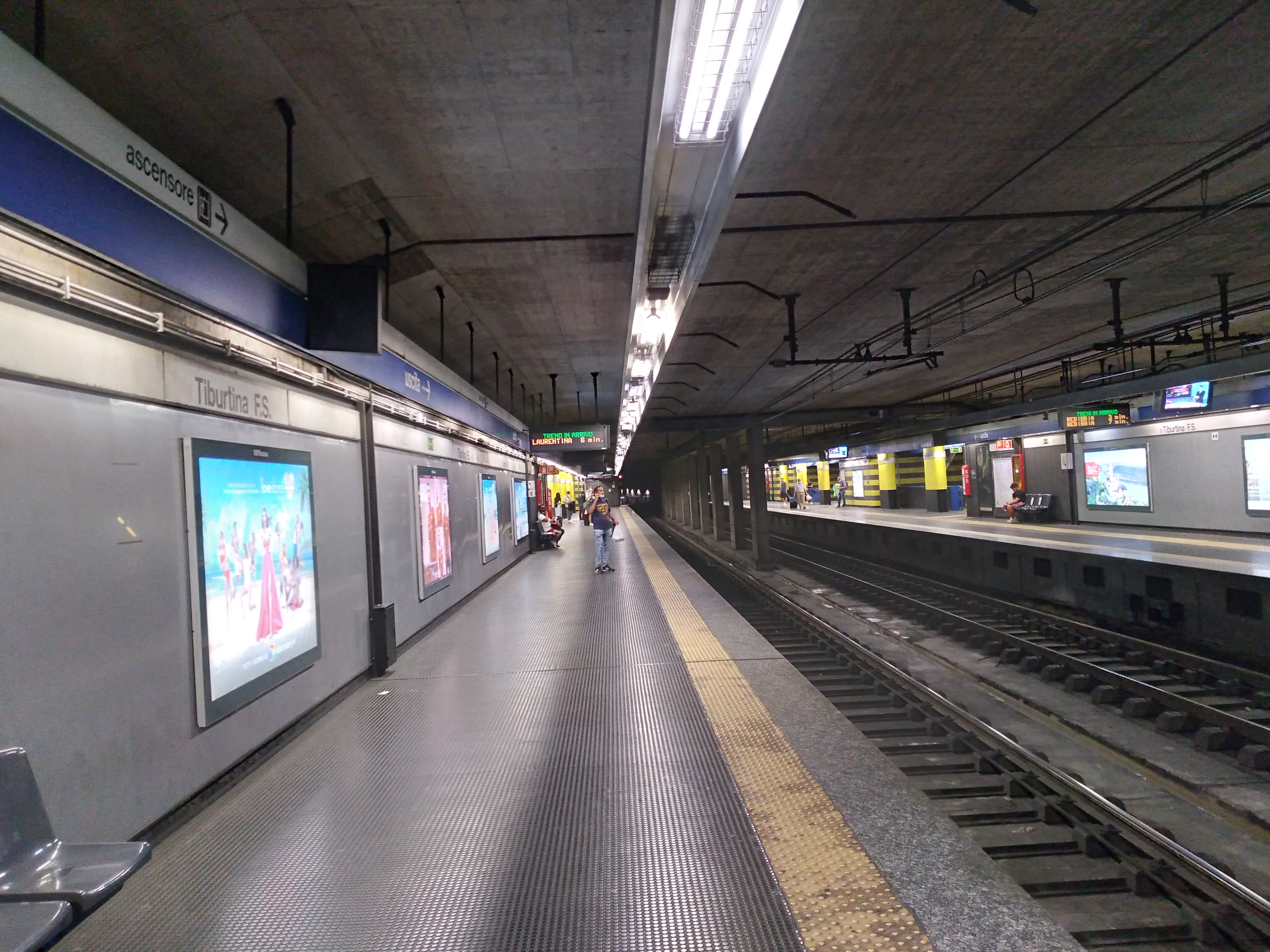

General information
- Coordinates: 41°54′39″N 12°31′46″E
- Owner: ATAC

Construction
- Structure type: Underground

History
- Opened: 8 December 1990; 35 years ago

Services
| Preceding station | Rome Metro | Following station |
|---|---|---|
| Bologna towards Laurentina | Line B | Quintiliani towards Rebibbia |
Location
- Click on the map to see marker

Tiburtina is a station on Line B of the Rome Metro. It was opened on 8 December 1990 and is sited beneath the Roma Tiburtina railway station, which is served by FL1, FL2 and FL3 mainline Trenitalia services.

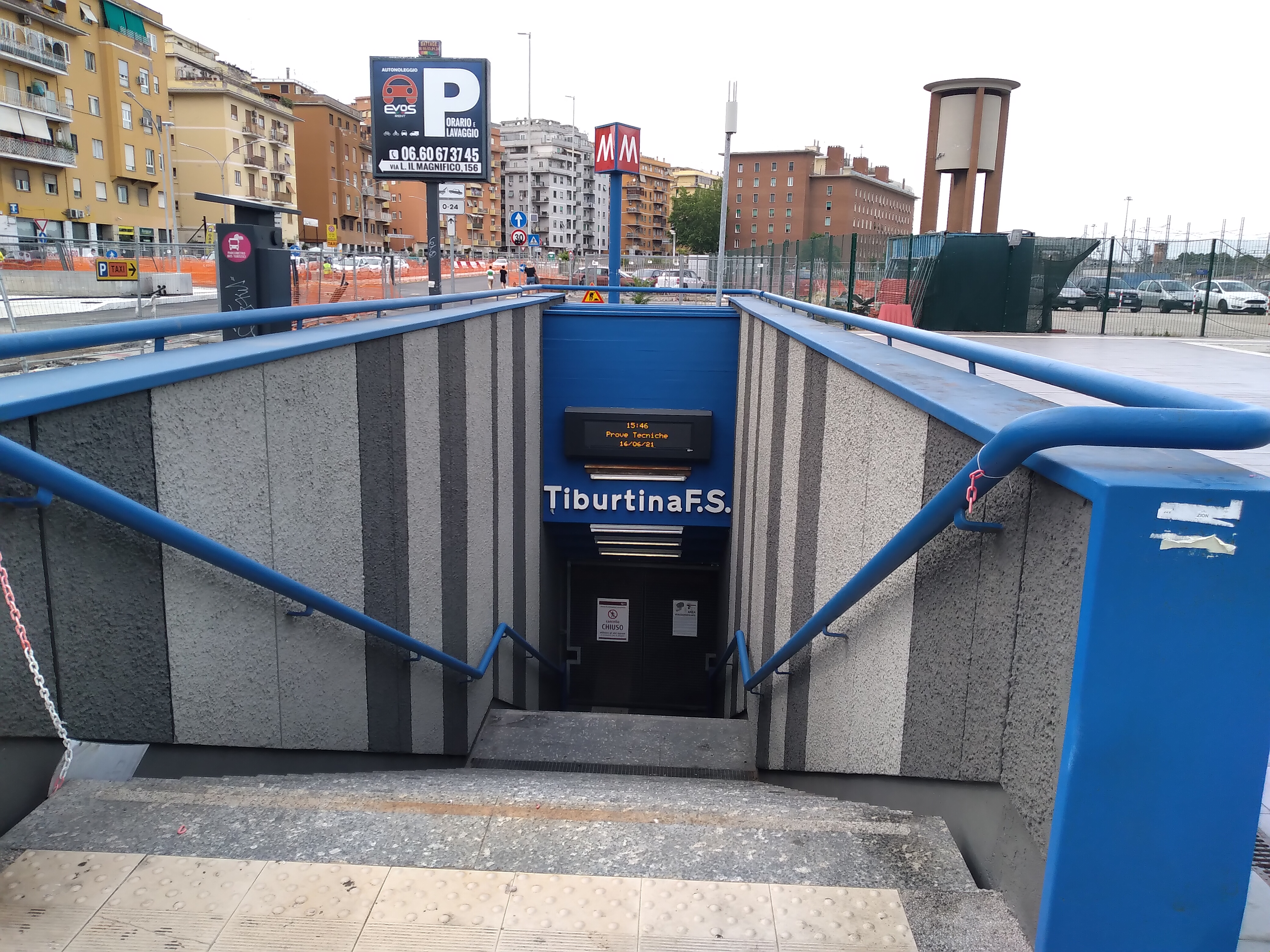
The Station Entrance

== Nearby ==
- Università degli studi di Roma "La Sapienza"
- Campo Verano
- San Lorenzo fuori le mura
- Quartiere San Lorenzo
