= Sant'Ippolito, Rome =

Church in Rome, Italy

Sant'Ippolito
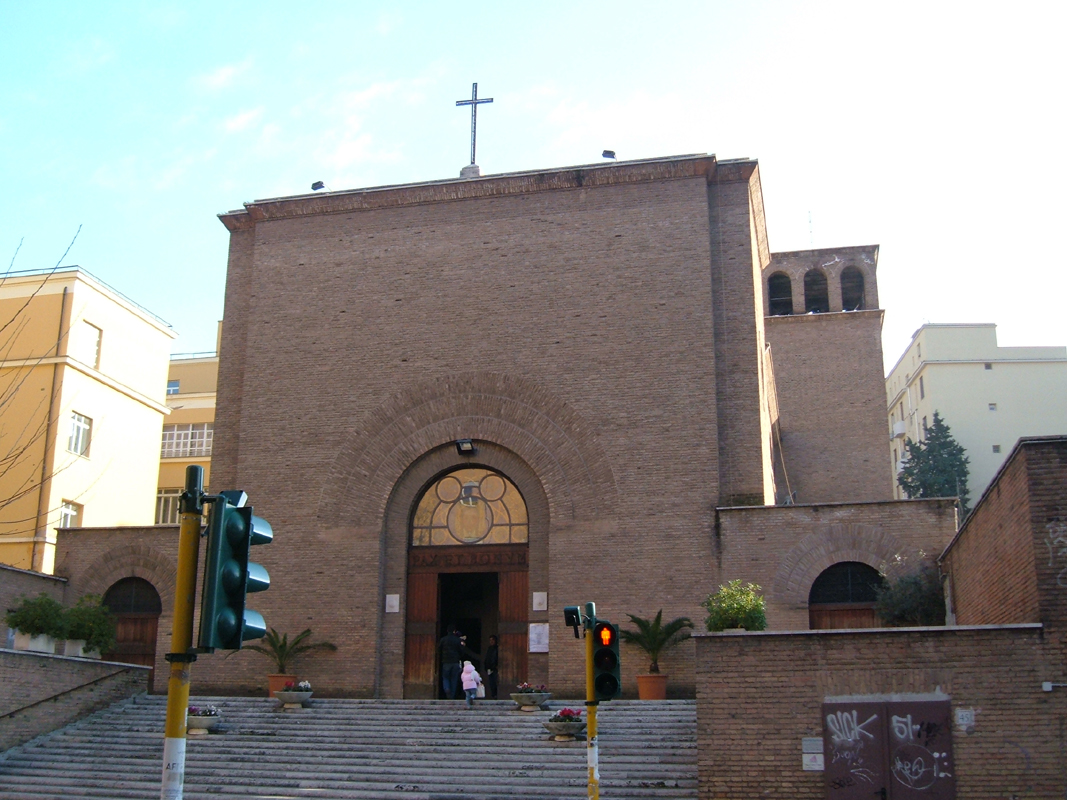
- Exterior
- Sant'Ippolito
- Location: Nomentano, Rome, Italy
- Country: Italy
- Denomination: Catholic Church
- Website: santippolito.org

History
- Dedication: Hippolytus of Rome
- Consecrated: October 4, 1938

Architecture
- Architect: Clemente Busiri Vici
- Style: Rationalist
- Groundbreaking: 1933
- Completed: 1934

Sant'Ippolito is a Catholic place of worship in Rome, located in the Nomentano district, on Viale delle Provincie.

== History ==
It was commissioned by Pope Pius XI and built between 1933 and 1934 by architect Clemente Busiri Vici; it was blessed on December 23, 1934, and the first Mass was celebrated on Christmas night; it was solemnly consecrated on October 4, 1938. The church is dedicated to Saint Hippolytus the martyr, whose catacomb is located nearby.

The church is a parish seat, established on May 26, 1935, by decree of the vicar general Cardinal Francesco Marchetti Selvaggiani Pastoris Boni vestigiis; initially entrusted to the Capuchin Friars Minor, since 1985 it has been managed by the diocesan clergy.

Since February 14, 2015, it has been the seat of the Sant'Ippolito cardinal title.

== Description ==
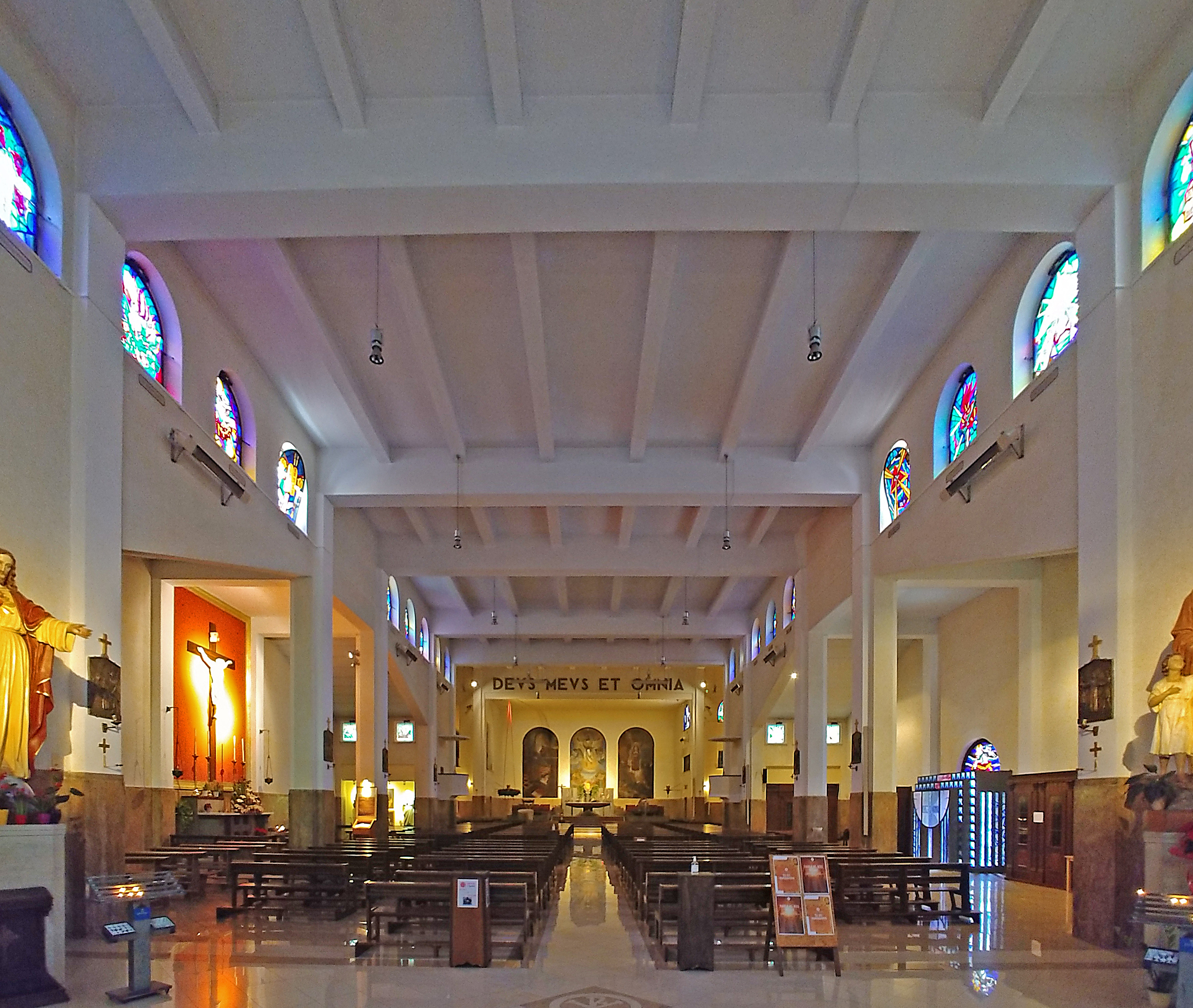
Interior

The church is externally clad in bricks, recalling Franciscan poverty. A wide staircase leads to the central door, flanked by two smaller ones: on the lintel is the inscription Pax et bonum, surmounted by a stained glass depicting the face of Christ. Along the right side of the church rises the square-plan bell tower housing a peal of three bells cast by the Cavadini company of Verona.

The interior of the church, mostly plastered white, has a three-nave layout divided by concrete pillars, with a transept; the ceiling, also in concrete, recalls in its lines the coffered ceilings of ancient churches. The church is dominated by the apse with its three works and the large inscription, of Franciscan inspiration, Deus meus et omnia:

- the central fresco depicts the Glory of Saint Hippolytus, a work by Orazio Amato from 1950: the saint is shown in priestly garments while, with arms outstretched, he ascends upward, supported by two angels; the faces of the characters are inspired by the Franciscan friars who at the time lived in the adjacent convent;
- the two side paintings, depicting the Eucharistic Miracle of Saint Clare of Assisi and Saint Lawrence of Brindisi, were made by Franco Casetti in 1960.

In the transept are displayed two paintings: the canvas of Saint Francis Patron of Italy by Gustavo Solimene (1941), where Pope Pius XII is depicted (who proclaimed the saint patron of Italy in 1939); the Apparition of Lourdes, by the same Solimene, made in 1940.

Other works present in the church are:

- a crucifix in plaster with a wooden cross, made in the 1930s and placed on the left side altar;
- the bronze panels of the Via Crucis, work of Domenico Mastroianni composed between 1934 and 1938;
- in the 1960s the neutral-colored windows were replaced with polychrome stained glass in Dalles glass and resin made by artist Luciano Vinardi; the iconographic program of the stained glass relies on a narrative through symbols of theological, biblical themes, of liturgical and devotional inspiration. This program was discussed and shared with the Franciscan friar Umberto Lovera. Proceeding from the entrance along the right side we encounter the stained glass: The Name of Mary; The Holy Face; Instruments of the Passion; The Holy Spirit; The Son; God the Father; Agnus Dei; Charity; Hope; Faith; Prudence; Justice; Saint Francis and Nature; The Supper at Emmaus. And proceeding from the entrance along the left side of the church the stained glass follow: The Name of Jesus; Holiness; Grace; Divine Fire; Eucharist; Tables of the Law; Obedience; Chastity; Poverty; Temperance; Fortitude. Other stained glass were made even more recently.
- In the two chapels of the transept one can also admire the graffiti, made by artist Luciano Vinardi in 1965 depicting episodes from the life of Mary and Saint Francis. The scenes were originally sgraffito on the gray background of the plaster, while in recent years the monochrome of the paintings has been altered by the repainting of the plaster in a yellow tone.

On the cantoria to the left of the presbytery is the pipe organ, built by the Pinchi company in 1957; with electric transmission, it has 23 stops on two manuals and pedal.

== Bibliography ==
- Monzo, Luigi (2017). L. Monzo: croci e fasci – Der italienische Kirchenbau in der Zeit des Faschismus, 1919-1945. 2 vol. Karlsruhe 2017 (doctoral thesis, Karlsruhe Institute of Technology, 2017) (in German). pp. 562–565. doi:10.5445/IR/1000071873.
- Claudio Rendina (2004). Le Chiese di Roma. Rome: Newton & Compton Editori. p. 165. ISBN 978-88-541-1833-1.
