= Biblioteca Nazionale Centrale =

The Biblioteca Nazionale Centrale can refer to:

- Biblioteca Nazionale Centrale Firenze
- Biblioteca Nazionale Centrale Roma
