= Tiburtino =

Q. VI Tiburtino
- Quartiere of Rome
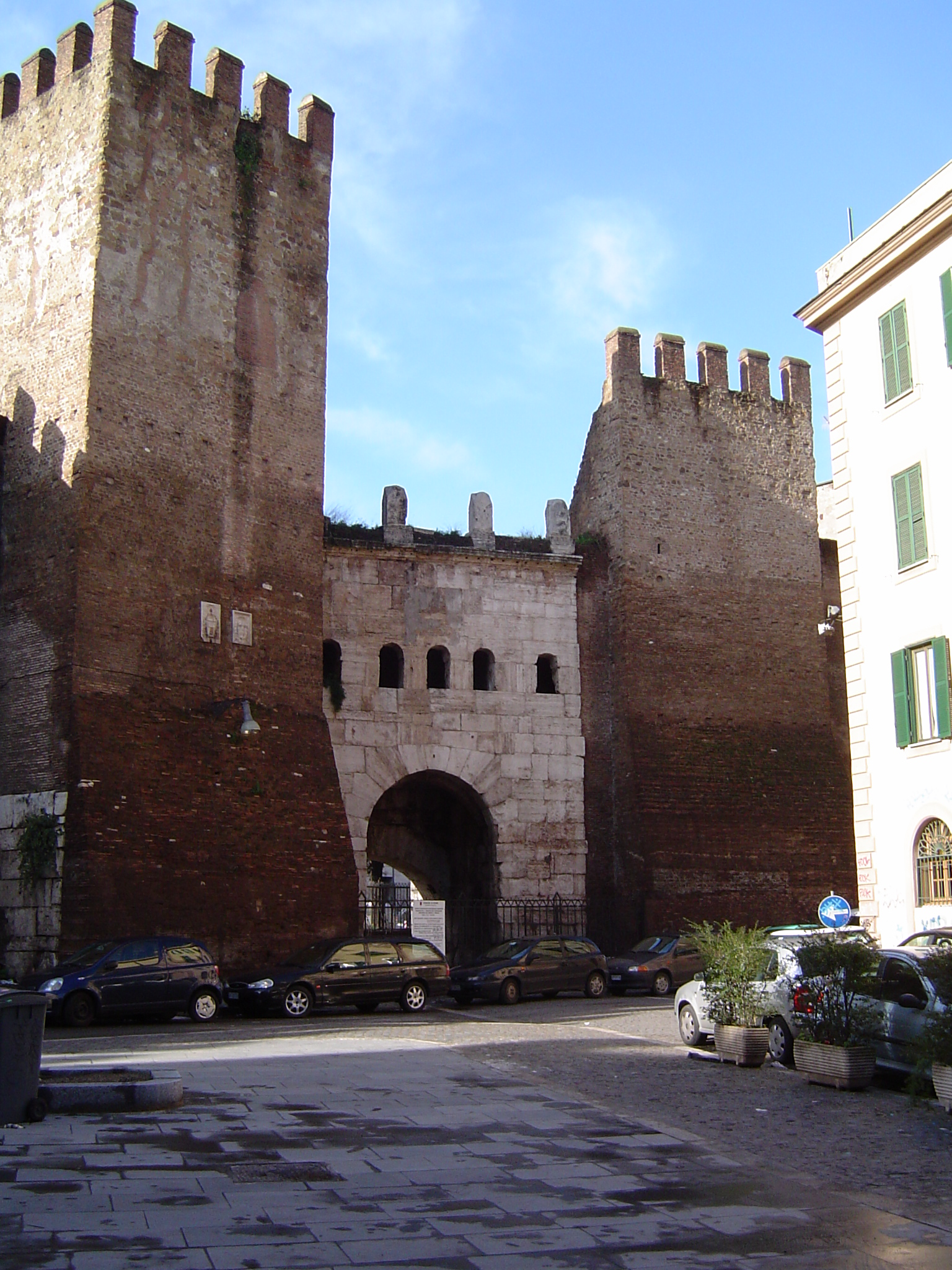
- Porta Tiburtina

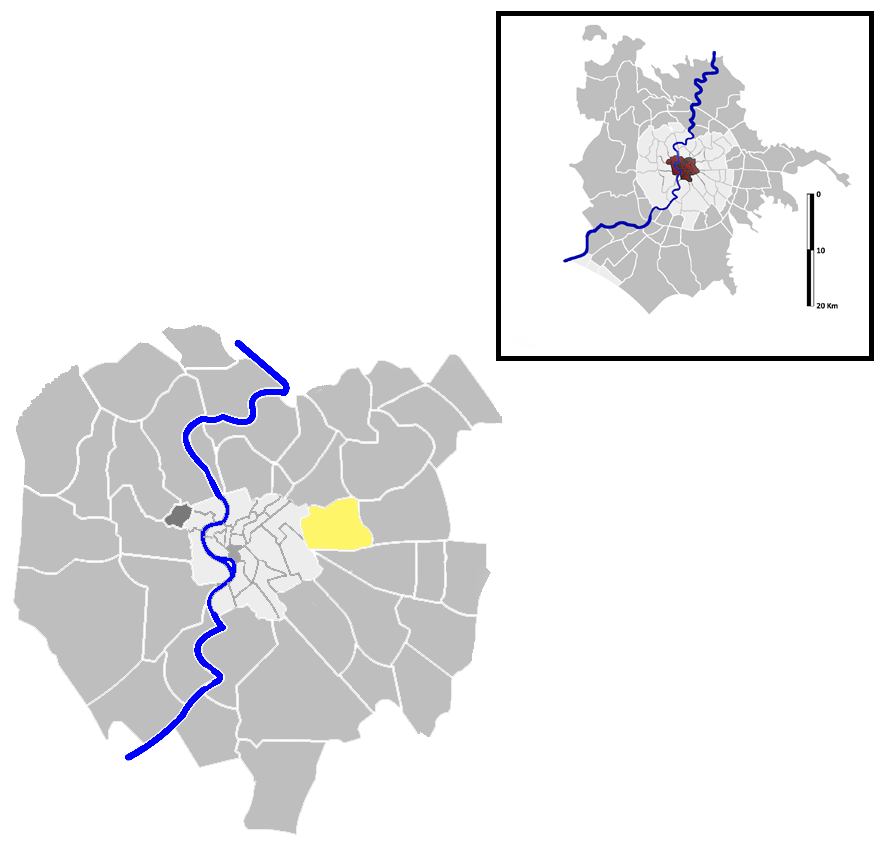
- Position of the quartiere within the city of Rome
- Country: Italy
- Region: Lazio
- Metropolitan City: Rome
- Comune: Rome
- Municipio: Municipio II; Municipio IV; Municipio V
- Established: 20 August 1921

Area
  - Total: 1.4333 sq mi (3.7123 km^{2})

Population (2016)
  - Total: 22,563
- Time zone: UTC+1 (CET)
  - Summer (DST): UTC+2 (CEST)

Tiburtino is the 6th quartiere of Rome (Italy), identified by the initials Q. VI. The name derives from the ancient road Via Tiburtina. It belongs to the Municipio II, Municipio IV and Municipio V.

== History ==
Nomentano is among the first 15 quarters of the city, which were born in 1911 and officially established in 1921. It included initially only the area of San Lorenzo, but starting from 1931 it began to expand towards the Via Prenestina, incorporating part of the then Suburbio Tiburtino up to Via di Portonaccio.

== Geography ==
The territory of Tiburtino includes the urban zones 3B San Lorenzo and 3Y Verano, as well as a portion of the urban zones 3X Università and 5A Casal Bertone.

=== Boundaries ===
Northward, the quarter borders with Quartiere Nomentano (Q. V), whose border is marked by Via del Castro Laurenziano and by the stretch of Via Tiburtina between the latter and Circonvallazione Tiburtina. It also shares a short border with Quartiere Pietralata (Q. XXI), which is delineated by the stretch of Via Tiburtina between Circonvallazione Tiburtina and Via di Portonaccio.

Eastward, Nomentano borders with Quartiere Collatino (Q. XXII), whose boundary is entirely outlined by Via di Portonaccio.

To the south, the quarter borders with Quartiere Prenestino-Labicano (Q. VII), from which is separated by the portion of Via Prenestina between Largo Preneste and Piazzale Labicano.

To the west, Nomentano borders with Rione Esquilino (R. XV) and with Rione Castro Pretorio (R. XVIII): the boundary is marked by the Aurelian Walls up to Viale dell'Università, then by Viale dell'Università itself.

=== Odonymy ===
The main roads of Tiburtino are Via Tiburtina, which starts from Piazzale Tiburtino, within the borders of the quartiere; Circonvallazione Tiburtina, a portion of the Tangenziale Est; Viale dello Scalo di San Lorenzo, which connects Circonvallazione Tiburtina to Piazzale Labicano. Other relevant roads are:

- Via di Casal Bertone
- Via Cesare De Lollis
- Via dei Ramni
- Viale Regina Elena
- Viale delle Scienze

Le piazze principali del quartiere sono:

- Piazza dell'Immacolata
- Piazzale Aldo Moro (formerly Piazzale delle Scienze)
- Largo degli Osci
- Piazza dei Sanniti
- Piazza di Santa Maria Consolatrice
- Piazzale del Verano

The odonyms of the quartiere Tiburtino can be categorized as follows:

- Ancient peoples, in the area surrounding Via Tiburtina: Via degli Ausoni, Via dei Bruzi, Via dei Caudini, Via dei Corsi, Via dei Dalmati, Via degli Equi, Via dei Frentani, Via dei Liburni, Via dei Marrucini, Via dei Marsi, Via dei Reti, Via dei Sardi, Piazza dei Siculi, Via dei Taurini, Via dei Volsci.
- Condottieri, along Via Prenestina: Via Silvio Caprara, Via Bartolomeo Colleoni, Via Stefano Colonna, Via Ettore Fieramosca, Via Gentile da Leonessa, Piazza Giovanni dalle Bande Nere, Via Biordo Michelotti, Via Raimondo Montecuccoli, Via Ottavio Piccolomini, Via Scipione Rivera.
- Italian generals and war heroes, in Casal Bertone: Via Giuseppe Arimondi, Via Antonio Baldissera, Via Maria Brighenti, Piazza Enrico Cosenz, Piazza Vittorio Dabormida, Piazza Tommaso De Cristoforis, Via Domenico De Dominicis, Via Giuseppe Galliano, Via Baldassarre Orero, Via Giuseppe Pianell, Via Alberto Pollio, Via Cesare Ricotti, Via Pietro Toselli.

== Places of interest ==
=== Civil buildings ===
- Seat of the Istituto Superiore di Sanità, in Viale Regina Elena. 20th-century building (1931–34). 41.904266°N 12.518224°E

design by architect Giuseppe Amendola.

- Palazzo dell'Aeronautica, in Viale Pretoriano.

design by architect Roberto Marino, it was the seat of the Ministry of Aeronautics between 1931 and 1947. Since 1947 it has hosted the Chief of Staff of the Italian Air Force.

=== Religious buildings ===
- San Lorenzo fuori le mura, in Piazzale del Verano. 4th-century church and papal basilica.
- Santa Maria Immacolata e San Giovanni Berchmans, in Piazza dell'Immacolata.
- Santa Maria Consolatrice, in Piazza Santa Maria Consolatrice.
- San Tommaso Moro, in Via dei Marrucini.
- Divina Sapienza, in Piazzale Aldo Moro, within the Università degli Studi di Roma La Sapienza.

=== Archaeological sites ===
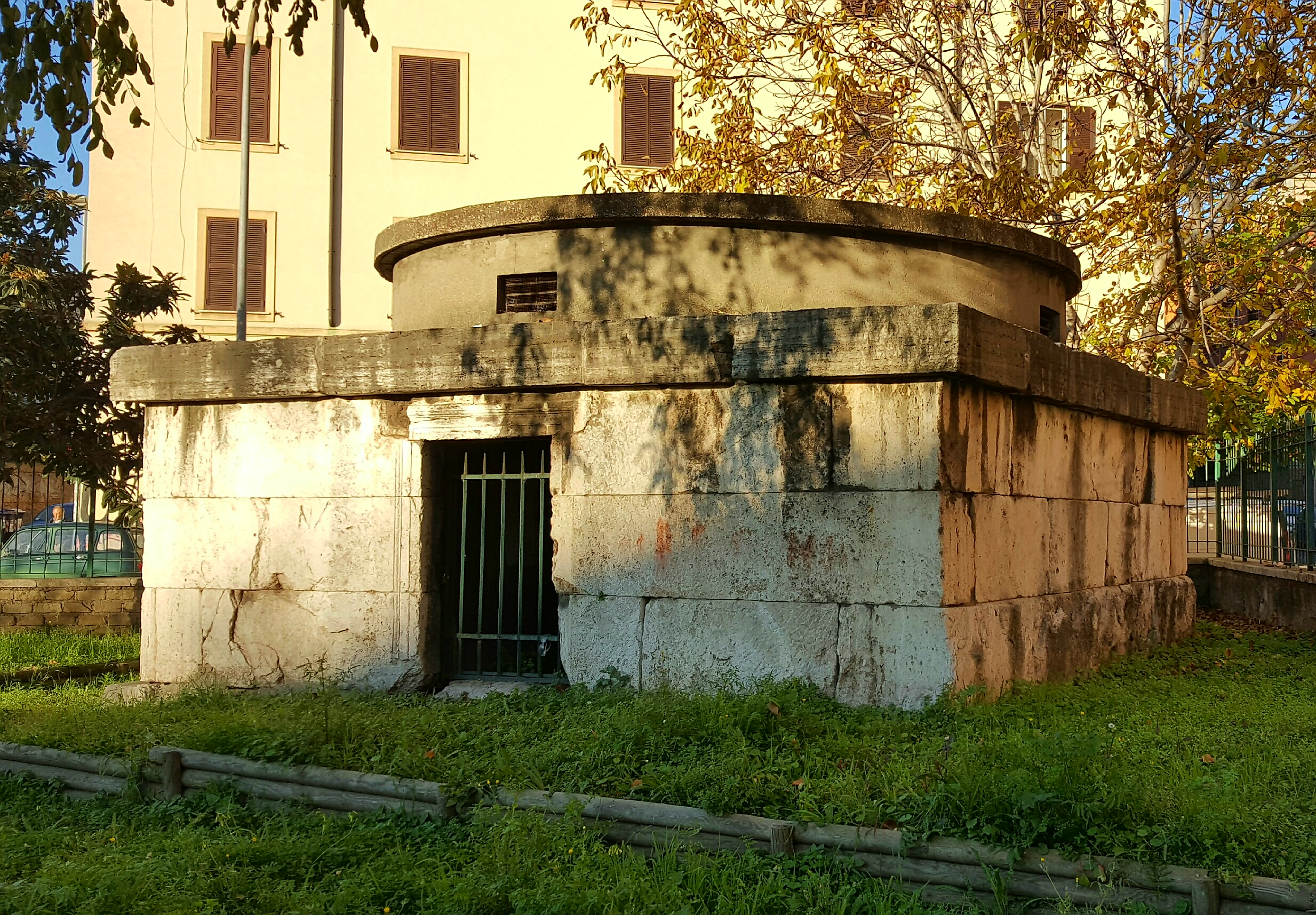
Sepulchre in Largo Talamo

- Torrione prenestino, in Via Prenestina. 1st-century BC mausoleum.
- Porta Tiburtina or San Lorenzo, at the beginning of Via Tiburtina. 1st-century BC arch.
- Sepulchre of largo Talamo, in Largo Eduardo Talamo. 1st-century mausoleum. 41.894717°N 12.516962°E
- Catacomb of Novatian

=== Industrial archaeology ===
- Ex SNIA Viscosa, in Via Prenestina. 20th-century industrial complex (1922–23).

rayon factory established in 1923 as CISA Viscosa and operating until 1954. In 1969 CISA was incorporated by SNIA Viscosa.

=== Other ===
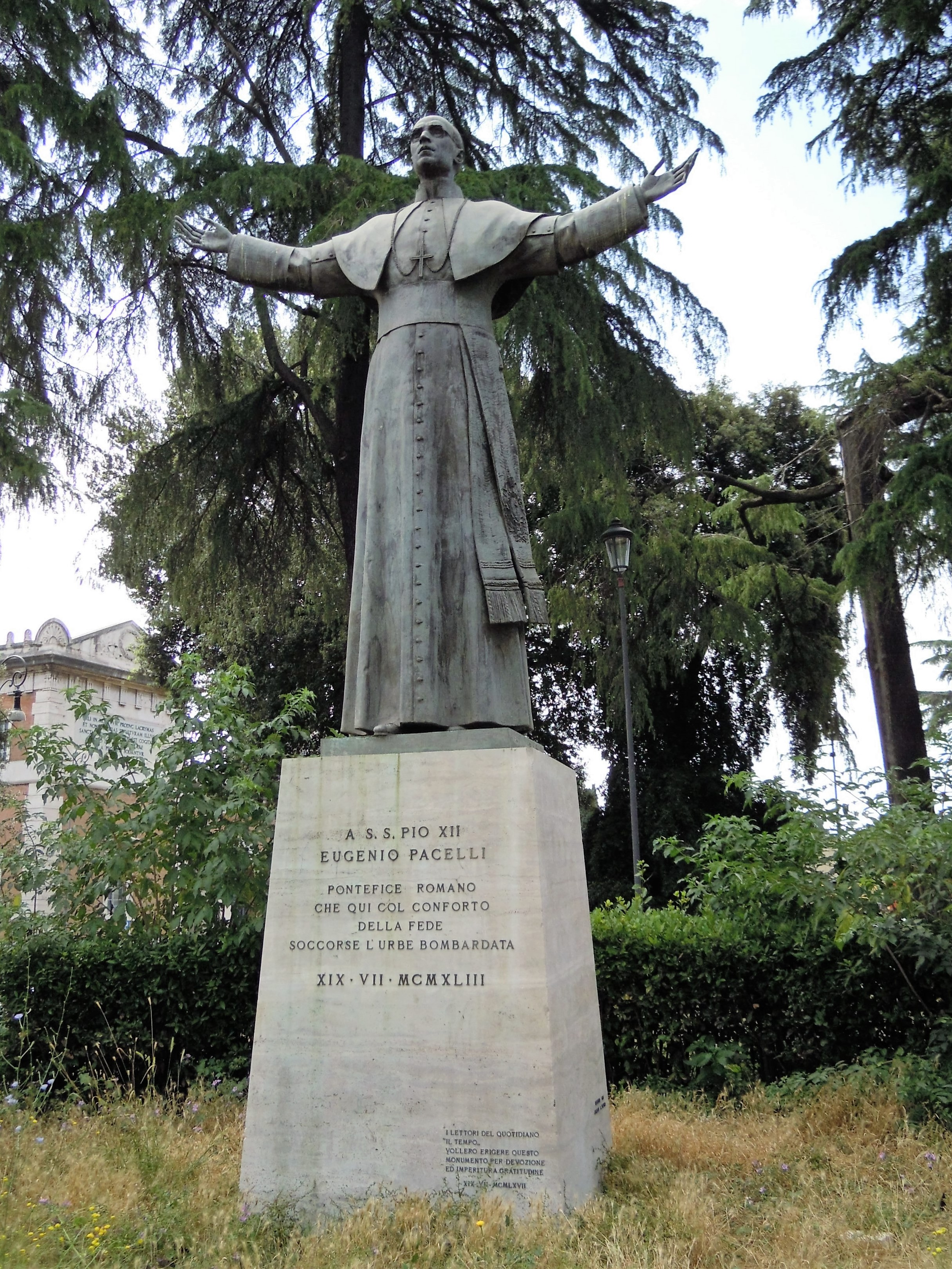
Monument to Pius XII in Piazzale del Verano

- Campo Verano, in Via Tiburtina. 19th-century monumental cemetery (1809–12).
- Campus of the Università degli Studi di Roma La Sapienza. 20th-century rationalist buildings (1935).
- Scalo San Lorenzo, in Viale dello Scalo San Lorenzo. 41.895628°N 12.523156°E

=== Parks ===
- Villa Gordiani
