= Biblioteca Nazionale =

Biblioteca Nazionale may refer to one of four national libraries in Italy:

- Biblioteca Nazionale Centrale Firenze in Florence
- Biblioteca Nazionale Centrale Roma in Rome
- Biblioteca Nazionale Vittorio Emanuele III in Naples
- Turin National University Library, Biblioteca nazionale universitaria

or to the Biblioteca nazionale svizzera (official name in Italian of the Swiss National Library)
