= Palmiro Togliatti railway station =

Railway station in Rome, Italy

Serenissima
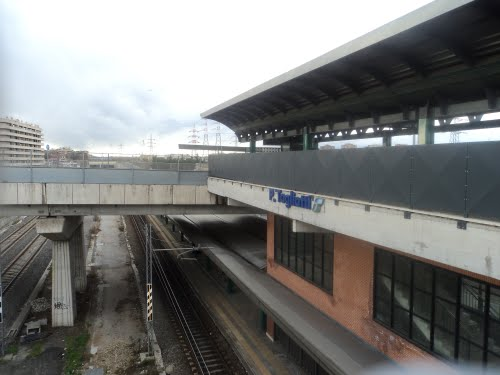

General information
- Location: Italy
- Coordinates: 41°54′12.22″N 12°34′27″E
- Owner: Rete Ferroviaria Italiana
- Operator: Trenitalia
- Lines: Roma Tiburtina—Tivoli; Rome–Sulmona–Pescara railway
- Platforms: 2

History
- Opened: 2006
Location
- Click on the map for a fullscreen view

The Palmiro Togliatti railway station is a railway station located along the Rome–Pescara railway in the Collatino district of Rome.

== History ==
The station was opened to service on 17 December 2006, together with the facilities of La Rustica Città and Serenissima.

As part of the construction works for Line C of the Rome Metro, excavation works began in 2012 along Via Collatina Vecchia near one of the station exits; this exit was closed at the same time.

== Structures and facilities ==
There is a platform, 250 m (820 ft) long, access to which for passengers is provided by an underpass. The station is equipped with structures and facilities to ensure access for people with disabilities.

== Services ==
The station is served by trains of the FL2 service operated by Trenitalia.

== Interchanges ==
- Bus stop (ATAC lines)

From 2026 it will also become a station on the new Line 10 of the Rome tramway.

Preceding station	Lazio regional railways	Following station
Serenissima towards [[ railway station|]]	FL2	Tor Sapienza towards [[ railway station|]]
