= Catacomb of Sant'Ippolito =

Coordinates: 41.9076°N 12.5199°E

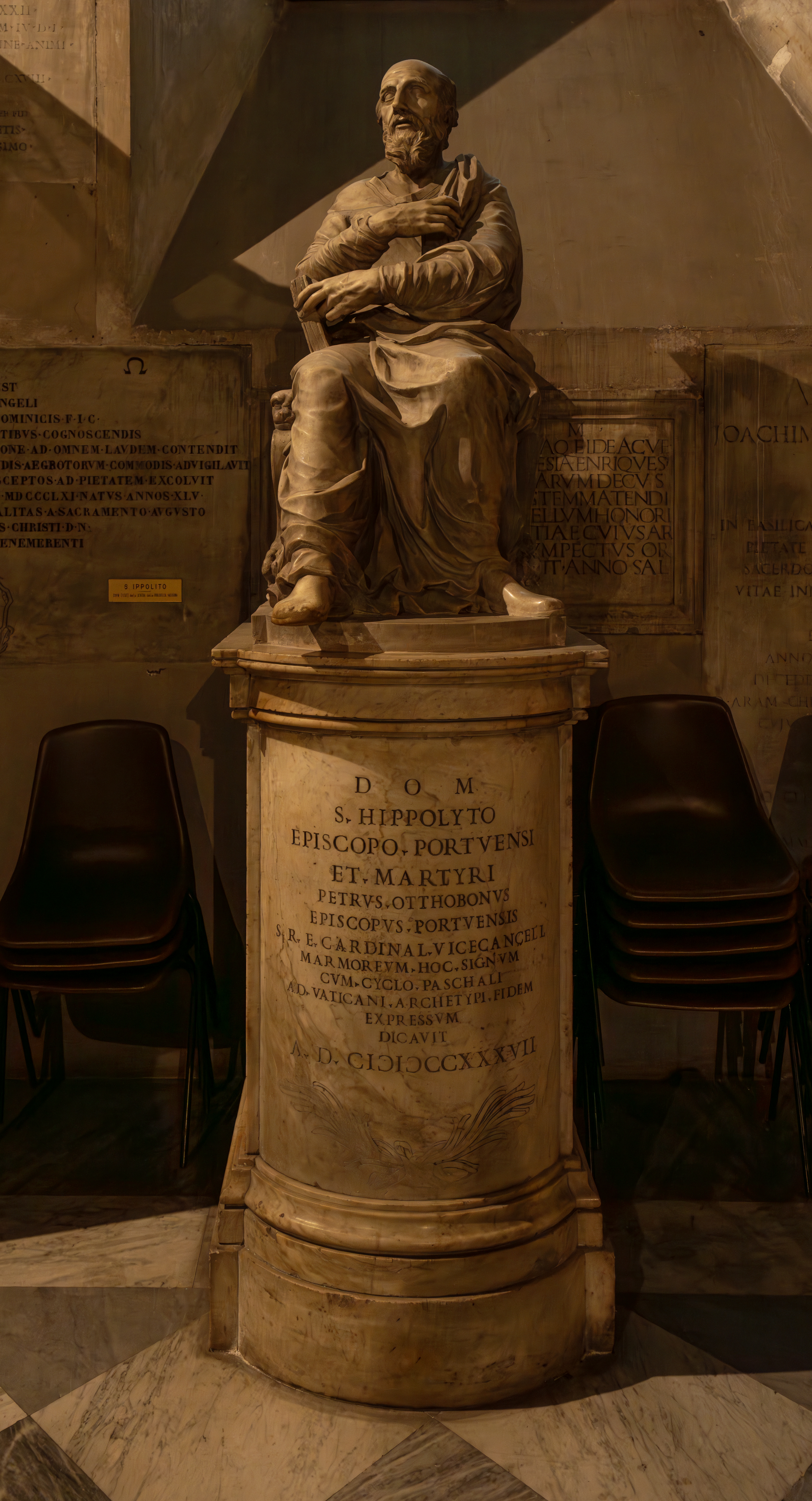
Statue of Saint Hippolytus of Rome, discovered in the catacomb in 1553, now in the hall of the Biblioteca apostolica vaticana.

The Catacomb of Sant'Ippolito is a catacomb on the via Tiburtina in Rome, now entered from via dei Canneti in the modern Nomentano quartiere.

== History ==
It is named after the best-known saint buried in it, Hippolytus of Rome, from early in the 3rd century, recorded as a priest, bishop, soldier, anti-heretical writer and martyr in the ancient literary sources. He was exiled to Sardinia with Pope Pontianus, both dying in the mines. The Depositio martyrum entry for 13 August records that Hippolytus was buried on the via Tiburtina and Pontianus in the catacomb of Callixtus on via Appia, both on 13 August. Hippolytus is remembered in the poem that Pope Damasus I had engraved by Furius Dionysius Filocalus, several fragments of which have been discovered in the pavement of the Basilica of St. John Lateran.

The Christian writer and poet Prudentius, who visited the cemetery at the beginning of the 5th century, speaks of it in the eleventh poem of his Peristephanon: he describes the underground crypt where the martyr was buried, the fresco portraying him and the ornaments enriching his tomb, along with a three-aisled basilica above ground, of which today no definite remains have been found. The 5th century Martyrologium Hieronymianum mentions the martyrs Concordia (22 February) and Genesius (24 August) as both also being buried in the catacomb. The 7th century Notitia ecclesiarum urbis Romae adds two more martyrs, Tryphonia and Cyrilla, but no traces remain of their monuments in the catacomb.

The first to explore the catacomb was Antonio Bosio around the end of the 16th century, who is thought to have dug through to it from the neighbouring catacomb of San Lorenzo. At the start of the 18th century Marcantonio Boldetti recognised the cemetery on the via Tiburtina as the catacomb of Sant'Ippolito based on documents by 12th-13th notaries which called the monticello in which it was excavated the cemetery "mons sancti Ypoliti" (mountain of Saint Hippolytus). The first modern investigation was by Giovanni Battista de Rossi in the 19th century, assisted by Fabio Gori - they discovered a three-apse mauseoleum above ground (now destroyed) and an underground basilica built by Pope Vigilius in the 6th century over Hippolytus' tomb. Also, by studying an ancient codex now in Saint Petersburg and made available to him by the tsar himself, De Rossi successfully reconstructed the entire building built by Damasus. The Barnabite Luigi Bruzza collaborated with De Rossi, though the former fell in a ditch during a visit to the site.

Studied since the start of the 20th century, the cemetery was damaged by its use as an air raid shelter during the Second World War. After the war it was studied by the American Gabriel Bertonière and the priest Umberto Maria Fasola. Further investigations in the 1990s have still found few inscriptions due to substantial looting from the 19th century onwards.

== Description ==
It is on five levels, though the only accessible one is the middle one. The oldest part is that around the underground basilica, built by pope Vigilius around the tomb of Hippolytus. A crypt built by Damasus I in the second half of the 4th century was already on the same site. The construction of the basilica and a vast 'iter' for pilgrims irreversibly altered the layout of the ancient centre of the cemetery.

The most-discussed discovery in the catacomb was a statue rediscovered by Pirro Ligorio in 1553, now in the entrance hall of the Biblioteca apostolica vaticana. It shows a bearded man sitting on a throne, dressed as a philosopher, with the sides of his footstool sculpted with the Greek titles of Hippolytus' books. Previously identified as Hippolytus, but the epigraphist Margherita Guarducci has shown that it is actually a reworking of one or more sections of 2nd century articles, reused in the 3rd century (when the list of Hippolytus' works was sculpted) and with Ligorio himself adding the upper part of the bust, the arms and the head.

== Bibliography ==
- (in Italian) De Santis L. - Biamonte G., Le catacombe di Roma, Newton & Compton Editori, Roma 1997, pp. 234-242
- Berthonière G., The cult center of the martyr Hippolytus on the via Tiburtina, Oxford 1985
- (in Italian) De Rossi G. B., Il cimitero di S. Ippolito presso la via Tiburtina e la sua principale cripta storica oggi dissepolta, in Bullettino di Archeologia Cristiana, Serie IV, 1 (1882) 9-76
- (in Italian) Guarducci M., San Pietro e Sant'Ippolito: storia di statue famose in Vaticano, Roma 1991
- (in Italian) Ambrogio M. Piazzano "Storia delle elezioni pontificie", EDIZIONI PIEMME, Casale M. 2003.
