= Roma Prenestina railway station =

Railway station in Rome, Italy

Roma Prenestina
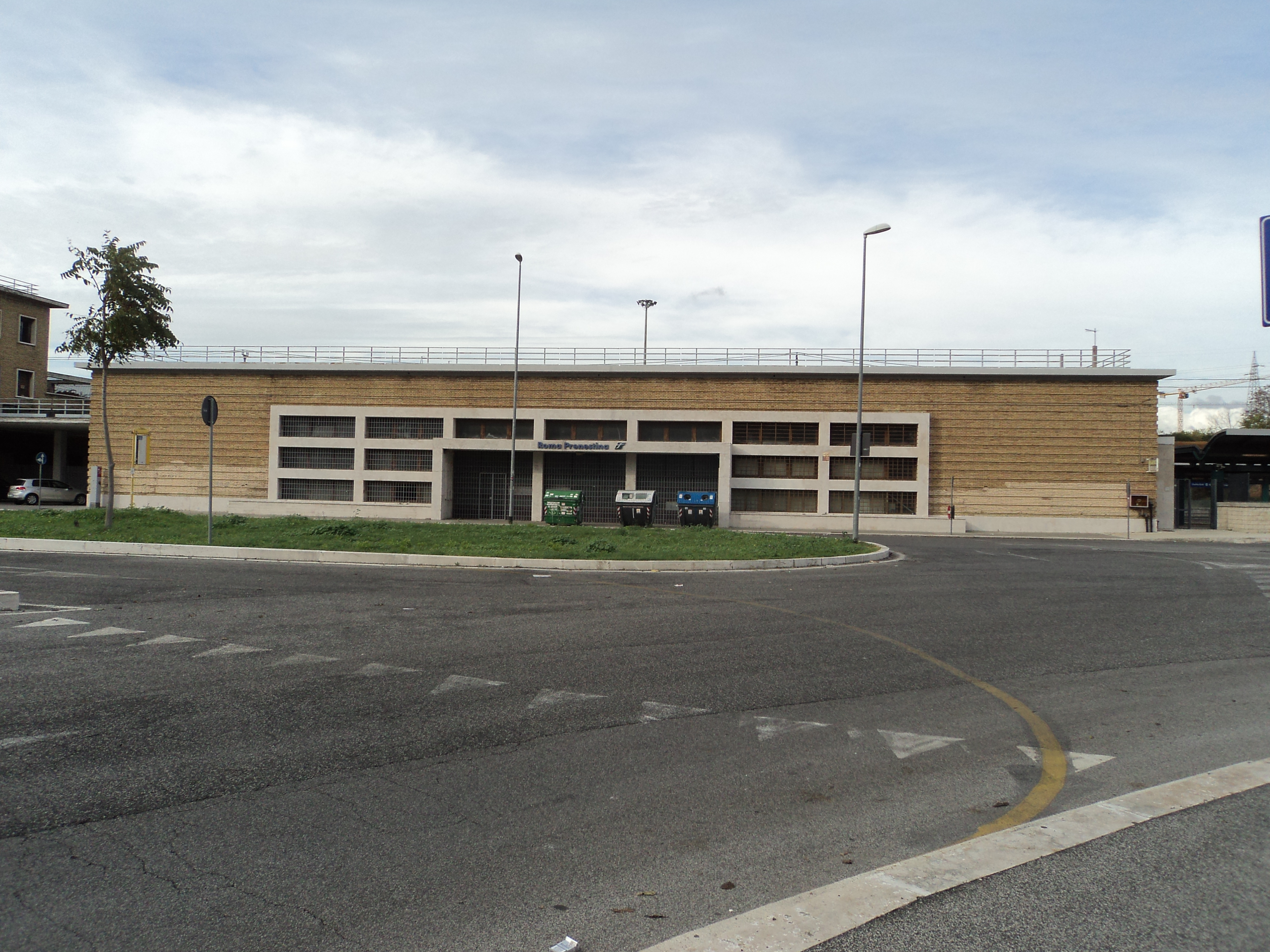

General information
- Location: Italy
- Coordinates: 41°53′51″N 12°32′44.52″E
- Owner: Rete Ferroviaria Italiana
- Operator: Trenitalia
- Lines: Roma Tiburtina—Tivoli; Rome–Sulmona–Pescara railway
- Platforms: 4

History
- Opened: 1939
Location
- Click on the map for a fullscreen view

Roma Prenestina railway station (Italian: Stazione di Roma Prenestina) is a railway station serving the city of Rome, Italy. It forms part of the Val D'Ala—Tivoli railway and the Rome–Sulmona–Pescara railway.

== History ==
The first Roma Prenestina station was inaugurated in 1887 alongside the Rome–Sulmona–Pescara railway. At the time of its construction, the station stood in open countryside and essentially served as a junction, allowing trains to diverge either toward Roma Termini or toward Portonaccio, today Roma Tiburtina.

The current station building was constructed between 1936 and 1938 based on a design by engineer Paolo Perilli.

The new station, located at kilometer point 4+256, was brought into service on 21 April 1939. At the same time, operations ceased at the old station located at kilometer point 3+592. During the 1960s, the surrounding area became densely urbanized along the axis of Via Prenestina. However, no direct access was created between the new residential districts and the station, which remained connected only by a secondary road to Via di Portonaccio and was therefore effectively isolated from nearby housing. A road was planned to link Via Prenestina directly to the station, also lending its name to the street, but the final section was never completed.

In 2006, Via della Stazione Prenestina was finally completed, and a parking lot was built in front of the station, along with the introduction of a stop for bus lines serving the Largo Preneste direction.

Preceding station	Lazio regional railways	Following station
Roma Tiburtina towards [[ railway station|]]	FL2	Serenissima towards [[ railway station|]]
