= Annibale Vitellozzi =

Italian architect

- Born: October 26, 1902; Rome, Kingdom of Italy
- Died: 16 September 1990 (aged 87); Rome, Italy
- Education: Sapienza University of Rome
- Occupations: Architect, urban planner
- Notable work: Façade of the Roma Termini railway station; Biblioteca Nazionale Centrale di Roma
- Movement: Rationalism

Annibale Vitellozzi (October 26, 1902, in Anghiari – September 16, 1990, in Rome) was an Italian architect, best remembered for his work on the Roma Termini railway station and the Biblioteca Nazionale Centrale di Roma.

== Biography ==
Annibale Vitellozzi was born in Anghiari, Arezzo, in 1902. He graduated in Architecture from Sapienza University of Rome in 1927. In 1937, it was decided to replace the old Roma Termini railway station, as part of the planning for the 1942 World's Fair, which was never held because of the outbreak of World War II. Vitellozzi was commissioned to design the station's façade, a notable example of Italian Rationalism, in collaboration with Leo Calini and Eugenio Montuori. Construction of the building was halted in 1943 when the Italian fascist government collapsed. The building was finally inaugurated in late 1950.

In 1938, Vitellozzi and Ernesto Puppo designed the monumental Pavilion of Autarchy, Research and Inventions for the Mostra autarchica del Minerale italiano. Vitellozzi created his most famous works for the 1960 Summer Olympics. These included the Swimming Stadium, which he designed in collaboration with Enrico Del Debbio, as well as the engineers Sergio Musmeci and Riccardo Morandi. He also designed the Sports Hall (commonly called PalaLottomatica) in collaboration with the engineer Pier Luigi Nervi.

Other notable works include the completion of the Stadio Olimpico (1949–1953), the National Athletics School in Formia (1953–1955), the Sports Palace in Turin (commonly called PalaRuffini), built to celebrate the 100th anniversary of the Unification of Italy, and the Biblioteca Nazionale Centrale di Roma in Castro Pretorio, near Termini Station, built together with architects Massimo Castellazzi and Tullio Dell'Anese. The Library, the largest in Italy, was inaugurated in 1975. It replaced the previous library, which was housed in the sixteenth-century Roman College.

In preparation for the 1990 FIFA World Cup in Italy, during which the Stadio Olimpico was the main stadium, Vitellozzi, together with the architects Maurizio Clerici and Paolo Teresi, as well as the structural engineers Antonio Michetti, completed a radical renovation of the facility, including a new roof. From 1961 to 1974, he served on the Building Commission of the City of Rome, first representing the National Academy of San Luca and then the National Institute of Urban Planning. He died in Rome in 1990, aged eighty-eight.
