= Saint Nicomedes =

Roman martyr

- Window in the parish church of St Remigius, Dunston in Norfolk, with stained glass representing St Nicomedes

Martyr
- Born: Ancient Rome
- Venerated in: Roman Catholic Church, Orthodox Church, and Anglican Communion
- Feast: 15 September and 1 June

Nicomedes was a martyr of unknown era, whose feast is observed 15 September. He was buried in a catacomb on the Via Nomentana near the gate of that name.

The Roman Martyrologium and the historical Martyrologies of Bede and his imitators place the feast on this date. The Gregorian Sacramentary contains under the same date the orations for his Mass. The name does not appear in the three oldest and most important Manuscripts of the Martyrologium Hieronymianum, but was inserted in later recensions. Nicomedes is without doubt a martyr of the Roman Church.

He was buried in a catacomb on the Via Nomentana near the gate of that name. Three seventh century Itineraries make explicit reference to his grave, and Pope Adrian I restored the church built over it (De Rossi, Roma Sotterranea, I, 178–79). A titular church of Rome, mentioned in the fifth century, was dedicated to him (titulus S. Nicomedis). The feast of the dedication of his church on 1 June alongside the 15 September feast of his martyrdom were included in the Sarum Rite calendars, but only the 1 June feast day was carried over into the Anglican Book of Common Prayer as a 'lesser holy day' or 'black-letter day'. The Church of San Nicomede and its surrounding neighborhood in Salsomaggiore in Parma are also named after him.

== Legend ==
Nothing is known of the circumstances of his death. The legend of the martyrdom of Nereus and Achilleus introduces him as a presbyter and places his death at the end of the first century. Butler says he "...was apprehended in the persecution of Domitian for his assiduity in assisting the martyrs in their conflicts, and for interring their bodies." Other recensions of the martyrdom of Nicomedes ascribe the sentence of death to the Emperor Maximianus (beginning of the fourth century).
