= Catacomb of San Lorenzo =

Catacomb in Rome, Italy

The Catacomb of San Lorenzo or Catacomb of Cyriaca is a five-level catacomb on via Tiburtina under the church of San Lorenzo fuori le mura in the modern Tiburtino quarter.

Its most common dedication in the ancient sources is to Saint Laurence, buried in it - the mid 4th century Depositio martyrum states he was buried on 10 August "in Tiburtina" but does not give a name for the cemetery, showing that by the time of writing it was already named after Laurence. Other sources name it after Ciriaca, owner of the land on which it was dug - the Liber Pontificalis and a 6th century martyrdom account of Saint Laurence states he was buried "on the via Tiburtina in land belonging to the widow Cyriaca in the ager Veranus", whilst 8th century sources even call her "beatus".

The tombs of Abbondius and Erennius, two other martyrs, were found in excavations in 1947-1949.

== Bibliography (in Italian) ==
- L. De Santis L.; G. Biamonte (1997). Le catacombe di Roma. Roma: Newton & Compton Editori. pp. 219–227.
- Frankl W. - Josi E. - Krautheimer R., Le esplorazioni nella basilica di S. Lorenzo nell'Agro Verano, in Rivista di Archeologia Cristiana 26 (1950) 9-48
- Matthiae G., S. Lorenzo fuori le mura, Roma, Marietti, 1966
- Salvatore Distefano, Le Reliquie di San Urbano martire a Palazzolo Acreide, Agorà (2013) n.43, pp. 76-80
- Simonetta Serra, Nuove scoperte della Pontificia commissione di archeologia cristiana nel cimitero del Verano a Roma, in 1983 - 1993: dieci anni di Archeologia Cristiana in Italia. Atti del VII Congresso Nazionale di Archeologia Cristiana (Cassino 20-24 settembre 1993), Cassino 2003, vol. II, pp. 427-449
