= Catacomb of Novatian =

Catacomb in Rome, Italy

The Catacomb of Novatian is a two-level catacomb on viale Regina Elena in Rome, at the junction of piazzale San Lorenzo and via Tiburtina in the modern Tiburtino quarter.

It is not mentioned in any ancient sources and so its name (still debated by scholars) derives from a mid 4th century inscription found there in April 1932 in a large niche with a table-form tomb, painted red and with a mosaic border. It reads Novatiano beatissimo marturi Gaudentius diaconus fecit (Gaudentius the deacon made this [dedicated] to Novatian the most blessed martyr).

== Bibliography (in Italian) ==
- De Santis L. - Biamonte G., Le catacombe di Roma, Newton & Compton Editori, Roma 1997, pp. 227-234
- Giordani R., “Novatiano beatissimo marturi Gaudentius diaconus fecit”. Contributo all'identificazione del martire Novaziano della catacomba anonima sulla via Tiburtina, in Rivista di Archeologia Cristiana 68, 1992, pp. 233-258
- Scrinari Santamaria V. - Fornari F., Le catacombe di Novaziano e la necropoli romana, Roma, Università La Sapienza, 1973
- Anita Rocco, La tomba del martire Novaziano, in Vetera Christianorum 45 (2008), pp. 149-167
- Anita Rocco, La più antica regione della catacomba di Novaziano: problemi storici e topografici, in: V. Fiocchi Nicolai, J. Guyon, Origine delle catacombe romane. Atti della Giornata di studio tematica dei Seminari di Archeologia Cristiana, Città del Vaticano 2006, pp. 215-238
