= Catacomb of San Nicomede =

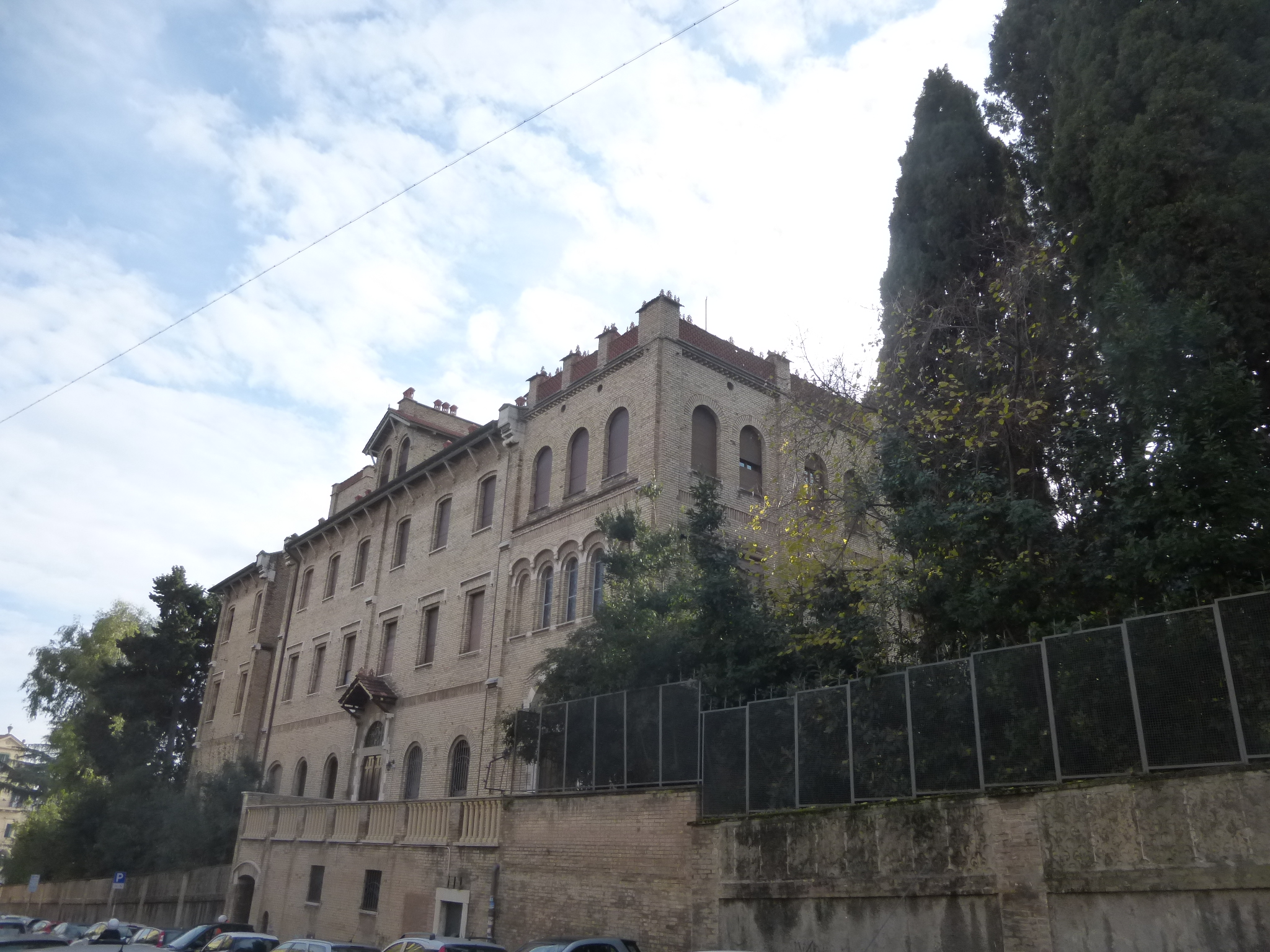
The monastery built over the site of the via dei Villini hypogeum.

The Catacomb of San Nicomede was a catacomb at the start of the via Nomentana near the modern Porta Pia in the Nomentano quarter, though its precise location is still unknown.

Except the Notitia ecclesiarum urbis Romae, the ancient literary sources state that Saint Nicomedes was buried near the gate to the via Nomentana, now Porta Pia. His legendary 'passio' states he was buried in land belonging to the presbyter Justus "beside the walls [on] via Nomentana', whilst the biography of pope Boniface V in the Liber Pontificalis refers to the construction of a basilica on the martyr's tomb, whilst that of Pope Adrian I states he restored a church dedicated to that saint "outside the porta Nomentana".

== Archaeological discoveries ==
From Antonio Bosio to the 20th century, several galleries have been found on the catacomb's presumed site, but none have been definitively identified as this catacomb:

- Early in the 17th century Bosio mentions in his Roma sotterranea discovering a hypogeum to the right of Porta Pia, which he identified with this catacomb; he describes it in detail but no traces remain of it today
- In the 19th century Giovanni Battista de Rossi discovered two hypogea of different sizes on land then belonging to marchese Patrizi (neither of them was the one discovered by Bosio; nothing now remains of the smaller one, whilst the larger one is under via dei Villini) and an above-ground apsidal monument (which he identified as a basilica dedicated to Nicomedes); he published his results, which convinced everyone the catacomb of Nicomedes had been found
- In the 1920s, during the construction of the Ministry of Transport, more than thirty underground galleries over two levels, with other galleries discovered in following years, thus convincing archaeologists that de Rossi' identification was wrong; all of these structures have been lost under the above-ground buildings.

== Bibliography (in Italian) ==
- De Santis L. - Biamonte G., Le catacombe di Roma, Newton & Compton Editori, Roma 1997, pp. 192-197
- De Rossi G. B., Roma. Nuove scoperte di cemeteri suburbani, in Bullettino di Archeologia Cristiana, serie I, 2 (1864) 80
- De Rossi G. B., Cemetero di S. Nicomede sulla via Nomentana, in Bullettino di Archeologia Cristiana, serie I, 2 (1864) 95
- De Rossi G. B., Degli ipogei cristiani scoperti nella villa Patrizi, in Bullettino di Archeologia Cristiana, serie I, 3 (1865) 49-54
