= FL2 (Lazio regional railways) =

Tivoli–Roma Tiburtina
- FL2
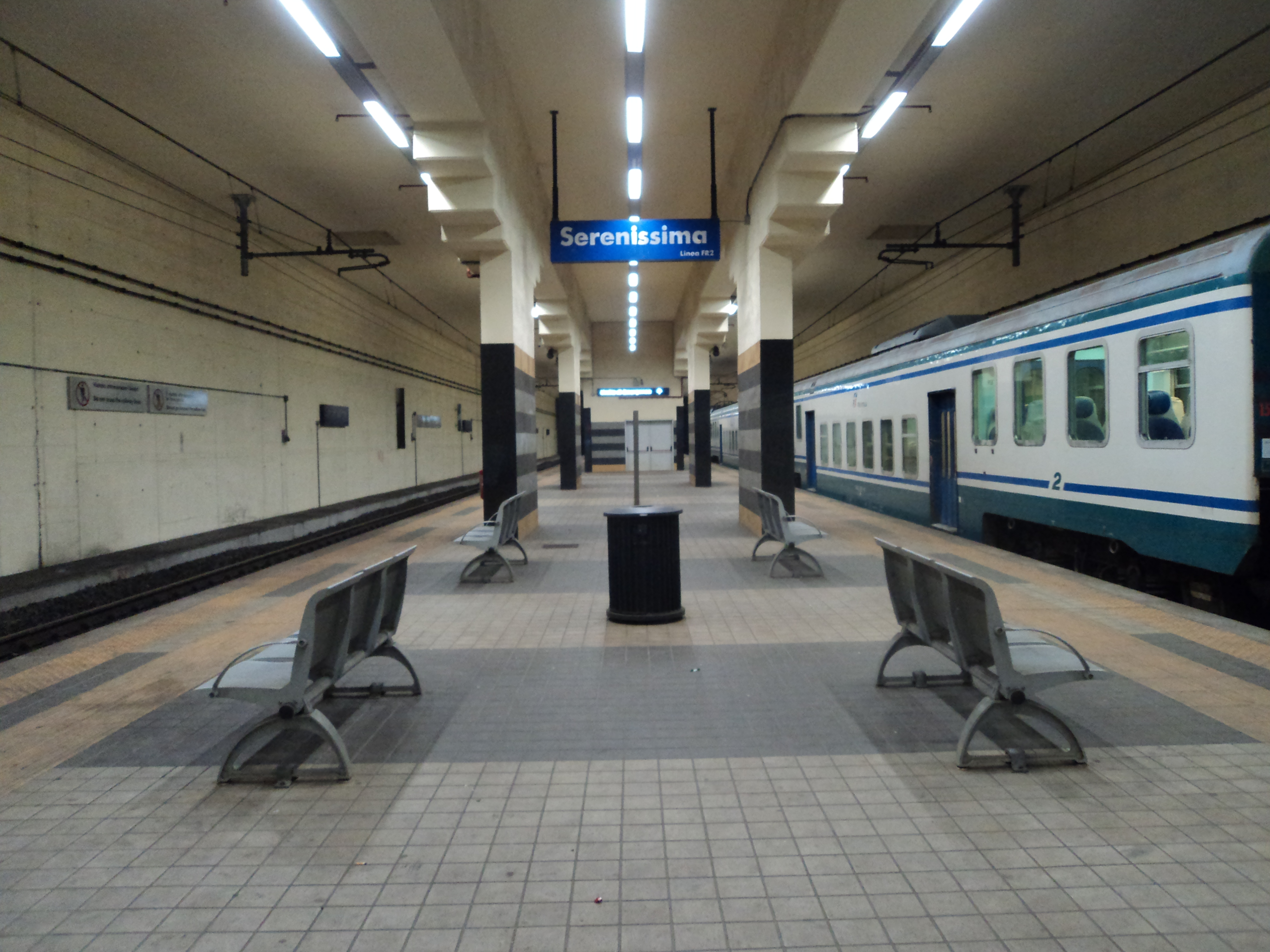
- The FL2 platforms and tracks at Serenissima.

Overview
- Status: Operational
- Locale: Rome, Italy
- Termini: Tivoli; Roma Tiburtina
- Stations: 13
- Website: trenitalia.com

Service
- Type: Regional rail
- System: Lazio regional railways
- Route number: FL2
- Operator: Trenitalia
- Rolling stock: E.464; Treno ad alta frequentazione
- Daily ridership: 22,000

History
- Opened: 1994

Technical
- Line length: 40 km (25 mi)
- Number of tracks: 1 (Tivoli–Lunghezza); 2 (Lunghezza–Rome)
- Track gauge: 1,435 mm (4 ft 8 1/2 in)
- Electrification: 3,000 V DC
- Operating speed: 41 km/h (25 mph) (ave)
Route map
The Lazio regional railways network.

The FL2 (until 2012 FR2) is a regional rail route forming part of the Lazio regional railways network (Italian: ferrovie regionali del Lazio), which is operated by Trenitalia, and converges on the city of Rome, Italy.

The route operates over the infrastructure of the Rome–Sulmona–Pescara railway. Within the territory of the comune of Rome, it plays the role of a commuter railway. It is estimated that on average about 22,000 passengers travel on an FL2 train each day.

The electronic destination boards at stations show only the designation "R" (Regional train).

== Route ==
- Tivoli ↔ Roma Tiburtina

The FL2, a radial route, runs from Tivoli, via the Rome–Sulmona–Pescara railway, to Roma Tiburtina. The route heads initially in a northerly direction, loops around to the west and then the south, before finally turning again to the west, towards central Rome.

== History ==
The FL2, which was known as the FM2 until 2004 and as FR2 until 2012, was established in 1994, along with other suburban rail services, to encourage the use of rail transport in the Rome metropolitan area. Prior to 1994, regional trains along the Rome–Sulmona–Pescara railway linked Rome only with Abruzzo; following the FM2's introduction, FM2 services ran between Rome and Tivoli, stopping at all stations, with a frequency of one train every 60 minutes.

Since the establishment of the FR2, Tivoli–Rome passenger traffic has increased considerably, partly because this section serves the most populous part of the metropolitan area, and also partly because of vehicular congestion on the Via Tiburtina Valeria and A24. However, further actions by other entities were needed; the single track configuration of the line led to what were often long pauses for the crossing of trains, and this, combined with the proximity of the stations between Lunghezza and Rome, made for a somewhat slow train ride.

Before work began on the Rome–Naples high-speed railway, the urban sections of which would have flanked the tracks of the Rome–Sulmona–Pescara railway between Roma Prenestina and Salone, it was decided to convert this section from double track to quadruple track as far as Lunghezza, and to build new stations, so as to establish a commuter service in all respects, and implement a clock-face schedule for it. Construction started on the high-speed railway in the late 1990s, and on the FR2 in the early 2000s. From 2002, due to work on the high-speed line, all trains on the FR2 were diverted to Roma Tiburtina until December 2005, when some trains from Pescara were again diverted, this time to Roma Termini. In the course of 2006, the quadruple track section between Roma Prenestina and La Rustica Uir went into service, while in 2007 the quadrupling work was completed to Lunghezza.

The construction work on this section involved the renewal of the tracks, the creation of artificial tunnels close to built-up areas to avoid noise pollution, the radical restructuring of existing stations, and the inauguration of new stations (Serenissima, Palmiro Togliatti and La Rustica Città). Tor Sapienza railway station was rebuilt and moved a few hundred metres (yards) closer to Rome than the original station, while at Roma Prenestina, FR2 trains were routed over the two secondary tracks, as the two main ones were reserved for high-speed services. Restructuring work at Lunghezza was completed in the course of 2008; FR2 trains now stop there a little further along with respect to the axis of the passenger building, and the station entrance has been moved to face the new parking lot.

== Stations ==
The stations on the FL2 are as follows:

- Tivoli
- Marcellina-Palombara
- Guidonia-Montecelio-San Angelo
- Bagni di Tivoli
- Lunghezza (limit of urban service)
- Ponte di Nona
- La Rustica Uir
- La Rustica Città
- Tor Sapienza
- Palmiro Togliatti
- Serenissima
- Roma Prenestina
- Roma Tiburtina

== Rolling stock ==
The rolling stock used on the FL2 route is a mixture of Treno ad alta frequentazione electric multiple units, and MDVE coaches hauled by E.464 class electric locomotives.

== Scheduling ==
The FL2 route is designated in Trenitalia official timetables as M75 Roma–Pescara FR2.

As of 2012, trains ran at hourly intervals between Tivoli and Lunghezza, and at half-hourly intervals between Lunghezza and Roma Tiburtina. Services are more frequent during rush hour, with some trains to/from Roma Tiburtina being extended beyond Lunghezza and Tivoli, respectively, to link the capital with Bagni di Tivoli and Mandela-Sambuci, respectively.

== See also ==
- History of rail transport
- History of rail transport in Italy
- List of railway stations in Lazio
- Rail transport in Italy
- Transport in Rome
