= Roma Tiburtina railway station =

Railway station in Rome, Italy

Roma Tiburtina
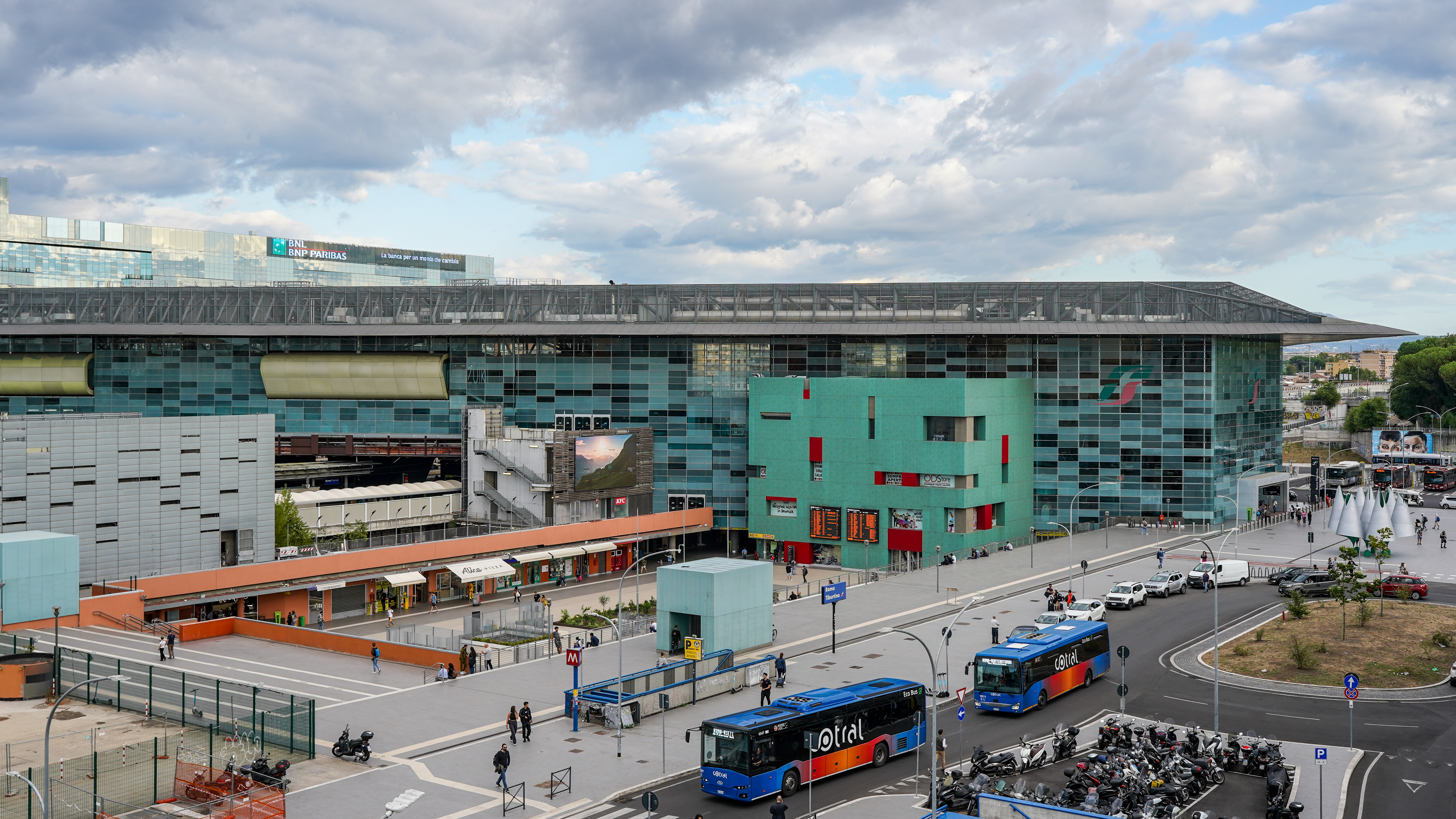
- Northwest facade of the station

General information
- Location: Piazzale Stazione Tiburtina; 00100 Roma RM; Italy
- Coordinates: 41°54′37″N 12°31′51″E,
- Owner: Rete Ferroviaria Italiana
- Operator: Grandi Stazioni
- Lines: Florence–Rome (traditional); Rome–Florence (high-speed); Rome–Naples (high-speed); Rome–Pescara; Rome–Ancona
- Distance: 4.5 km (2.8 mi) from Roma Termini
- Platforms: 20
- Connections: Commuter rail (FL1, FL2, FL3); Rome Metro (Line B); Bus stop; Taxi stand

Construction
- Architect: Paolo Desideri (2011 building)

History
- Opened: 1866
- Rebuilt: 28 November 2011
- Electrified: 3,000 V
Location
- Click on the map for a fullscreen view

Roma Tiburtina is the second largest railway station in Rome, after Roma Termini. Located in the north-eastern part of the city, it was originally constructed during the 1860s as a terminal station, and redeveloped during the 2010s. The station is connected to Rome's Metro line B at Tiburtina metro station, as well as to local bus services via an adjacent bus depot while private vehicle users are provided with more than 100,000 spaces across multiple on-site car parks.

Roma Tiburtina originally opened in 1866, only three years after the first (temporary) Roma Termini. It was originally known as Portonaccio station, but all usage of this name has since been depreciated. During the 1930s, work was undertaken to expand the station, this included the development of a new main building. A rebuild was undertaken shortly after the end of the Second World War as a result of damage sustained from aerial bombing missions. During 1990, an adjoining metro station was opened, providing further means of local transit for passengers. Since the late 1990s, Roma Tiburtina station has been managed by Grandi Stazioni, a wholly owned entity of the Italian state railway operator Ferrovie dello Stato Italiane.

Between 2007 and November 2011, Roma Tiburtina was subject to an extensive redevelopment programme, during which much of the original station building and infrastructure were demolished and replaced, and new on-site facilities established.

Originally, these works were meant to transform Tiburtina into the main Rome station for high-speed rail services on the Milan-Naples line: being a through station, trains travelling from Turin/Milan to Naples/Salerno would not have any need to turn around. However, for undisclosed reasons, this project was never achieved and the Roma Termini Station continues to be Rome's primary hub for high speed trains.

The station is now dedicated to the traditional regional trains and to some less frequent high speed trains. The new station was projected to reach a daily ridership of over 45,000 by 2015.

The station is currently served by 500 trains and 140,000 passenger transits per day (51 million users per year).

== History ==
=== Construction and early operations ===
What would later become known as Roma Tiburtina station was first opened in 1866, only three years after the opening of Rome's first major railway station, Roma Termini. Located in the eastern portion of the city, the station was one of the largest railway stations to have ever been constructed in Italy. During its early years, the station was originally known as Portonaccio.

During the 1930s, it was decided to expand the station via the construction of a new main building. On 18 October 1943, two days after the Raid of the Ghetto of Rome, about 1035 Jews were brought to Tiburtina station, loaded onto Holocaust trains and deported to Auschwitz concentration camp.

As a result of repeated aerial bombardments of Rome during the Second World War, the station suffered extensive damage, including to the recently completed main building. Accordingly, this building would be later rebuilt, albeit in a simplified configuration, during the immediate post-war years. Since the late 1990s, Roma Tiburtina station has been managed by Grandi Stazioni, a wholly owned entity of the Italian state railway operator Ferrovie dello Stato Italiane. While Roma Tiburtina station is regarded as being a heavily trafficked transit hub, even greater passenger numbers have been recorded at the more centrally located Termini.

In October 2003, Sally Baldwin, a visiting British University professor, was killed at the station when an escalator fell apart and a hole suddenly appeared beneath her feet. A local train driver, 38, who had attempted to rescue her also lost a leg; a third person was also seriously injured from falling into the mechanism. An inquiry was launched the next day by local magistrates into the incident; the escalator had been subject to recent maintenance work and safeguards intended to prevent its activation did not apparently work.

=== Redeveloped station ===
During summer 2004, it was announced that plans were prepared for a major upgrade of the station; a major goal of the renovations and redevelop work was to properly establish Roma Tiburtina as a capable transport hub for the expanding Italian high speed rail services. At this point, work was scheduled to commence in 2007 and the project was expected to have a total cost of €155 million. The project was only one element of the wider Trans-European Transport Network initiative conducted by the European Union. The redeveloped station was designed by architect Paolo Desideri, while the responsibility for managing both the design and construction phases resided with the Gemmo Railway Division, which also administered electrical and mechanical systems as well as the project's technical and financial aspects. During December 2007, demolition of the old station building commenced.

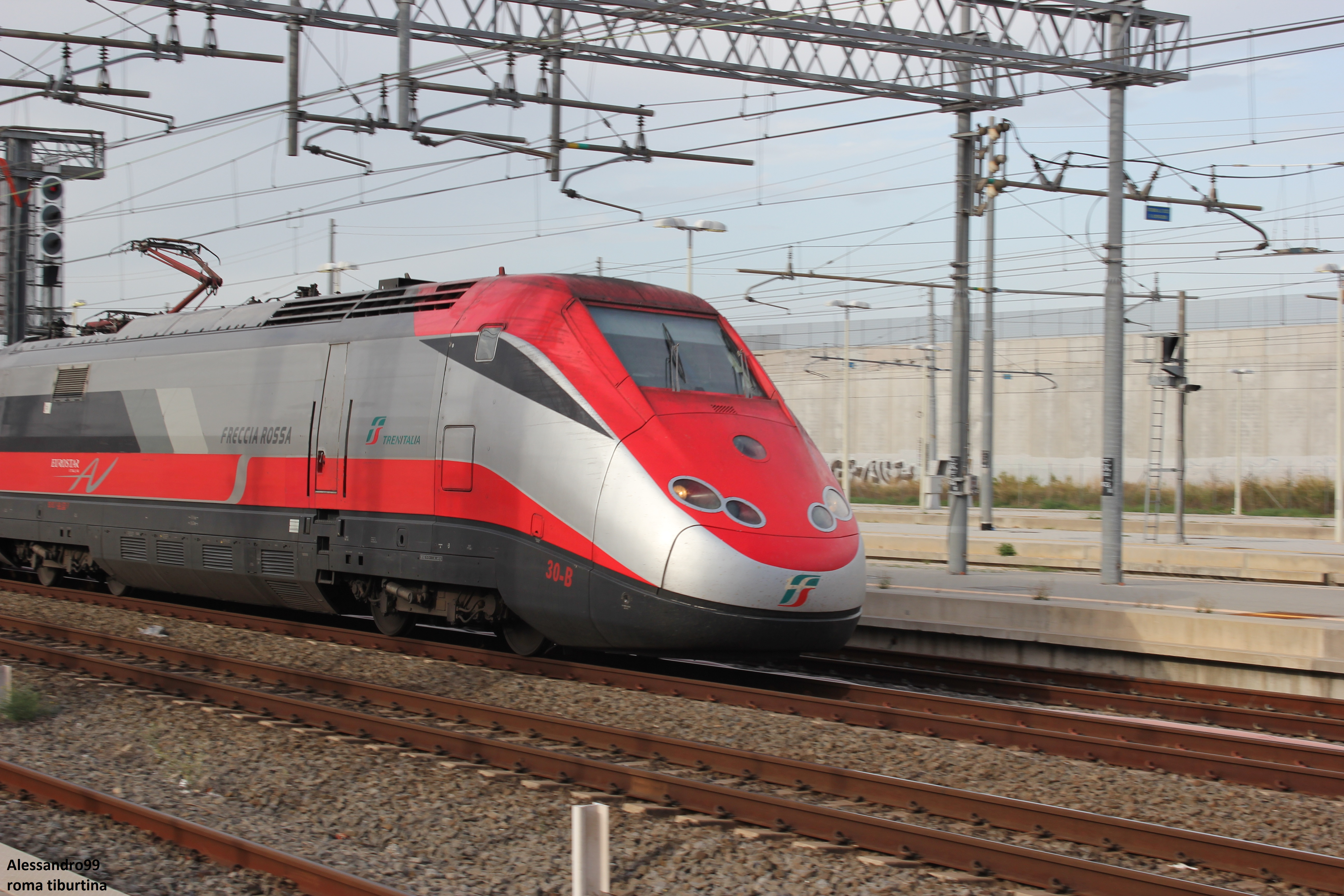
An ETR 500 high speed train at the station

As designed, the new Roma Tiburtina takes the form of a large bridge spanning across the railway lines and connecting between the Nomentano and Pietralata districts. It is an enclosed glazed parallelepiped structure, with a length of 240 metres (790 ft), a width of 50 m (160 ft), and suspended 9 m (30 ft) above ground level. The interior space is divided into eight separate rooms suspended from the roof. The suspension of the main structure offers several advantages, including a greater level of isolation from the noise and vibration generated by the passage of trains beneath it. The ground level platforms are connected to the suspended rooms above via an assortment of 29 escalators and 52 elevators.

The local railway infrastructure was also extensively changed, a total of 20 new high speed and high capacity tracks were laid in the station area, along with improvements to security systems and miscellaneous passenger-facing service infrastructure. The adjacent squares located at either side of the entrances to the station were intentionally developed to accommodate various new areas, including a railway office, a new metro line, a bus terminal, a shopping centre, offices and parking spaces; reportedly, in excess of 100,000 parking spaces were added along with various private access roads. By December 2010, the northern tracks and rail yard had been fully constructed and associated control equipment installed in a centralised traffic control center.

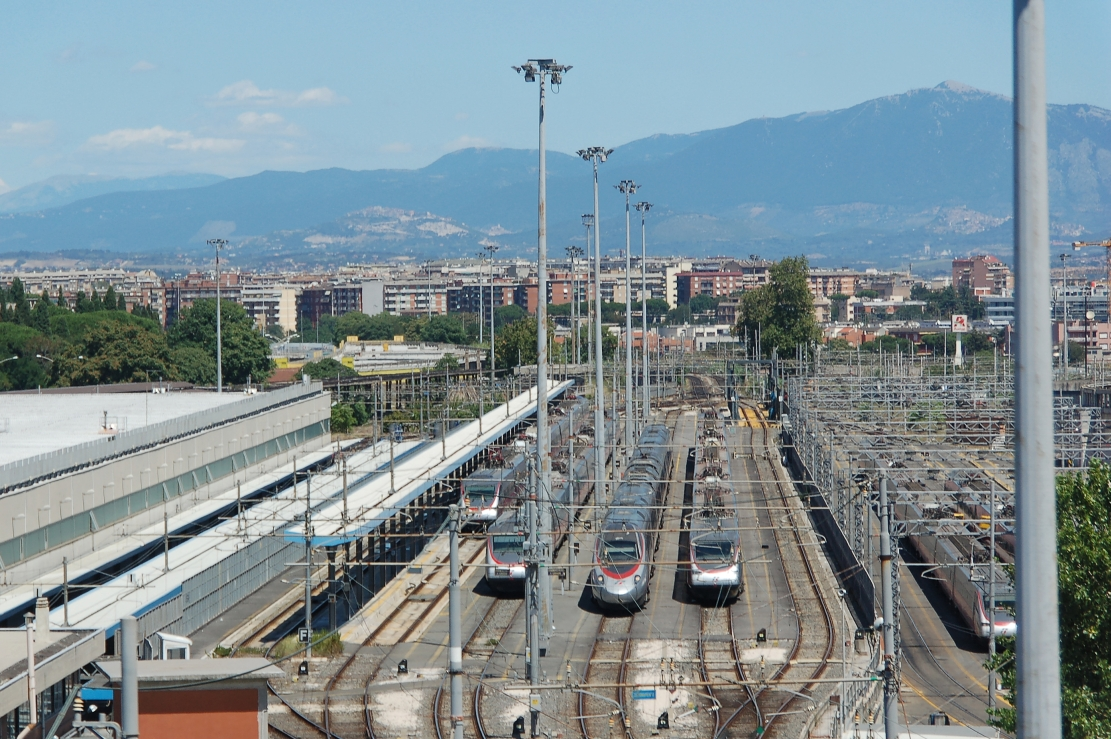
Overhead view across multiple tracks and platforms at Roma Tiburtina, 2011

In the early hours of 24 July 2011, a fire broke out in the relay room on the west side of the station. As a result, serious and unavoidable disruption to services occurred, including a temporary partial closure of Metro line B, between Castro Pretorio and Monti Tiburtini. The fire damaged equipment within the relay room, rendering the majority of controls for nearby tracks and traffic signals alike unusable, leaving a vital part of the Italian rail network disabled; reportedly, this led to significant train delays throughout the country. Furthermore, the damage to the structure had reportedly rendered the station building in danger of collapse; due to the impact of the fire, further problems and service delays that occurred for many months afterwards were attributed to the accident.

On 28 November 2011, following three years of construction work, the new station was officially inaugurated and dedicated to Cavour. By the end of the project, the total construction costs had almost doubled from the original projected figure to around €330 million. Roughly 13,400 tonnes (13,200 long tons; 14,800 short tons) of steel and 95,000 cubic metres (124,000 yd^{3}) of concrete was used during the station's construction. The completed station is expected to handle around 300,000 passengers per day.

== Train services ==
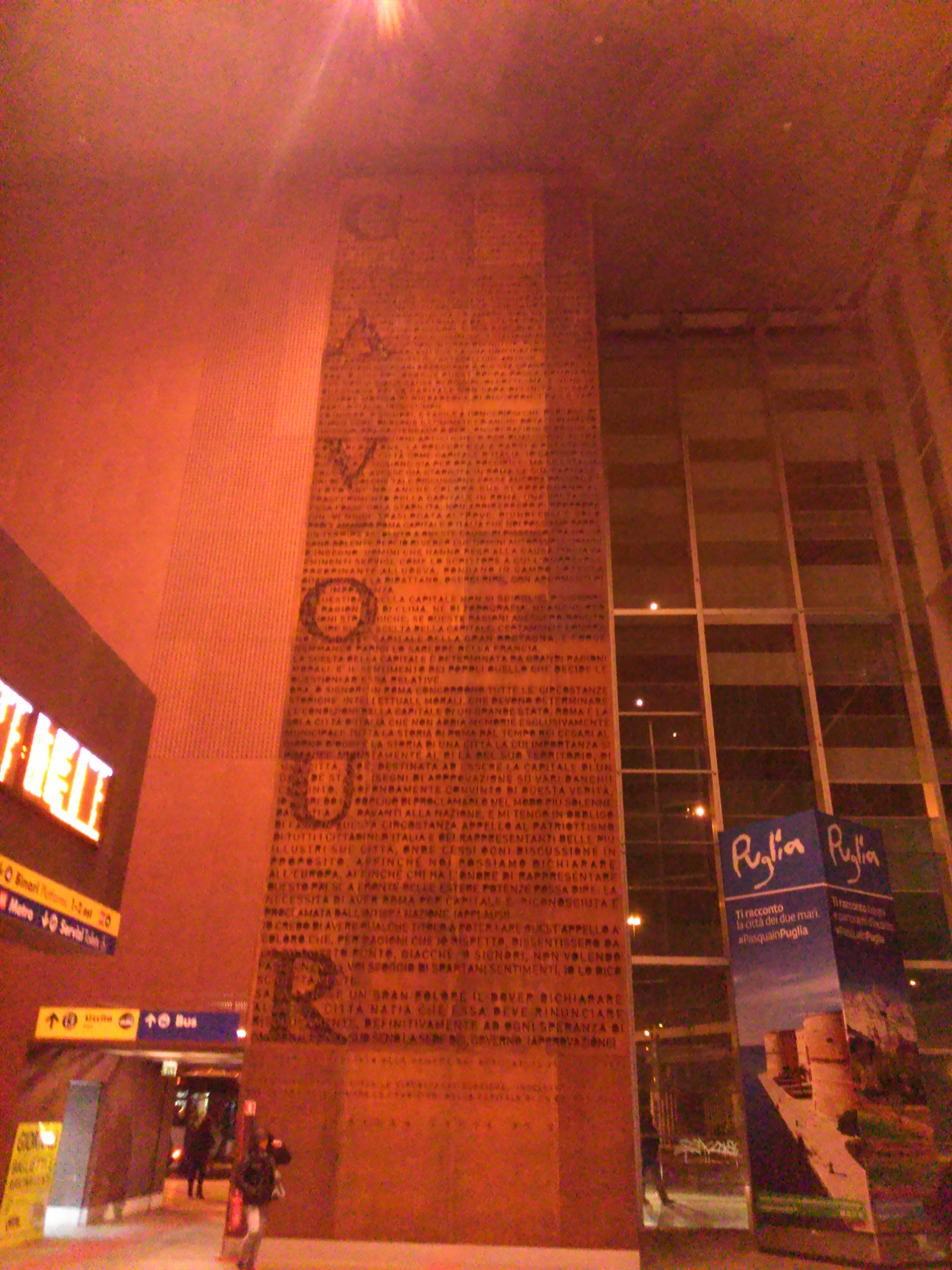
Stazione di Roma Tiburtina Cavour

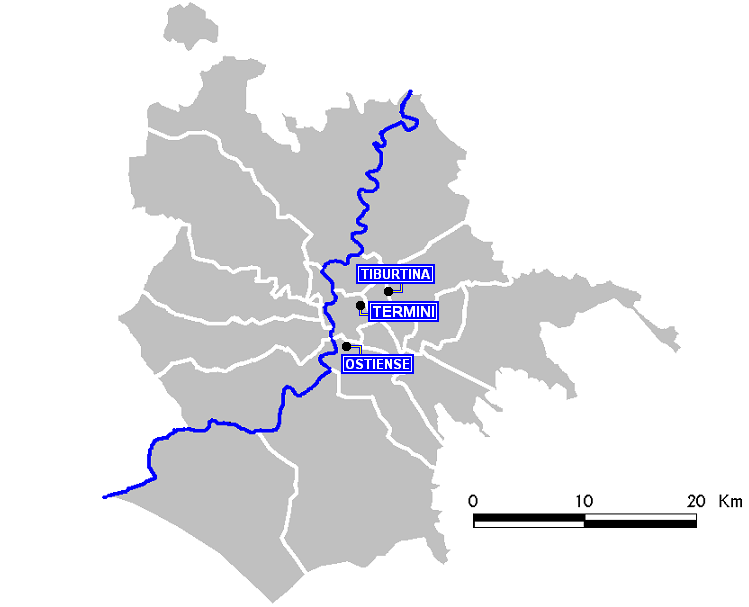
Location of Roma Tiburtina and other major stations in Rome

The station is served by the following services (incomplete):

- High speed services (Frecciarossa) Turin – Milan – Bologna – Florence – Rome – Naples – Salerno
- High speed services (Italo) Turin – Milan – Bologna – Florence – Rome – Naples – Salerno
- High speed services (Frecciarossa) Venice – Padua – Bologna – Florence – Rome – Naples – Salerno
- High speed services (Italo) Venice – Padua – Bologna – Florence – Rome – Naples – Salerno
- High speed services (Frecciargento) Trieste – Venice – Padua – Bologna – Florence – Rome
- High speed services (Frecciargento) Udine – Treviso – Venice – Padua – Bologna – Florence – Rome
- High speed services (Frecciargento) Venice – Padua – Bologna – Florence – Rome
- High speed services (Frecciargento) Venice – Padua – Bologna – Florence – Rome Tiburtina – Rome Fiumicino Airport
- Intercity services Milan – Parma – Bologna – Florence – Rome – Naples
- Night train (Intercity Notte) Turin – Milan – Parma – Rome – Naples – Salerno
- Night train (Intercity Notte) Turin – Milan – Parma – Florence – Rome – Salerno – Lamezia Terme – Reggio di Calabria
- Night train (Intercity Notte) Turin – Milan – Bologna – Florence – Rome – Naples – Salerno – Lamezia Terme – Reggio di Calabria
- Night train (ÖBB Nightjet) Munich - Salzburg - Villach - Bologna - Florence
- Night train (ÖBB Nightjet) Vienna - Bruck/Mur - Villach - Bologna - Florence
- Regional services (Treno regionale) Orte – Fara Sabina – Rome Tiburtina – Rome Fiumicino Airport
- Regional services (Treno regionale) Rome Tiburtina – Rome La Rustica – Rome Lunghezza – Guidonia – Tivoli
- Regional services (Treno regionale) Rome Tiburtina – Rome Cesano di Roma
- Regional services (Treno regionale) Rome – Tivoli – Celano – Pratola Peligna – Pescara
- Regional services (Treno regionale) Florence – Montevarchi – Arezzo – Orte – Rome
- Regional services (Treno regionale) Ancona – Foligno – Terni – Orte – Rome

== Interchanges ==
- Tiburtina station on Line B on the Rome Metro.
- 62 – 71 – 111 – 120F – 135 – 163 – 168 – 211 – 309 – 409 – 441 – 448 – 490 – 492 – 495 – 545 – 548 – 649 – nMB – n409 – n041 – C2 – C3
- Suburban buses (Cotral)
- Regional trains of Lazio Regional Railways
- Regional train to Rome Fiumicino Airport
- Bus shuttle to Rome Fiumicino Airport and Rome Ciampino Airport

The station also features a large and important bus station that serves both national and international destinations, such as Kyiv.

== See also ==
- Roma Termini
- Roma Ostiense
- History of rail transport in Italy
- List of railway stations in Lazio
- Rail transport in Italy
- Railway stations in Italy
- High-speed rail in Italy
- Treno Alta Velocità
