= Tullio Dell'Anese =

Italian architect and painter

Tullio Dall'Anese (1909 in Treviso – 2001 in Rome) was an Italian architect, painter, and sculptor, best remembered for his modernist architecture, such as his work on the Biblioteca Nazionale Centrale di Roma in 1975.
