= San Lorenzo fuori le mura =

Roman Catholic basilica and landmark in Rome, Italy

Papal Basilica of Saint Lawrence outside the Walls
- Basilica Papale di San Lorenzo fuori le mura
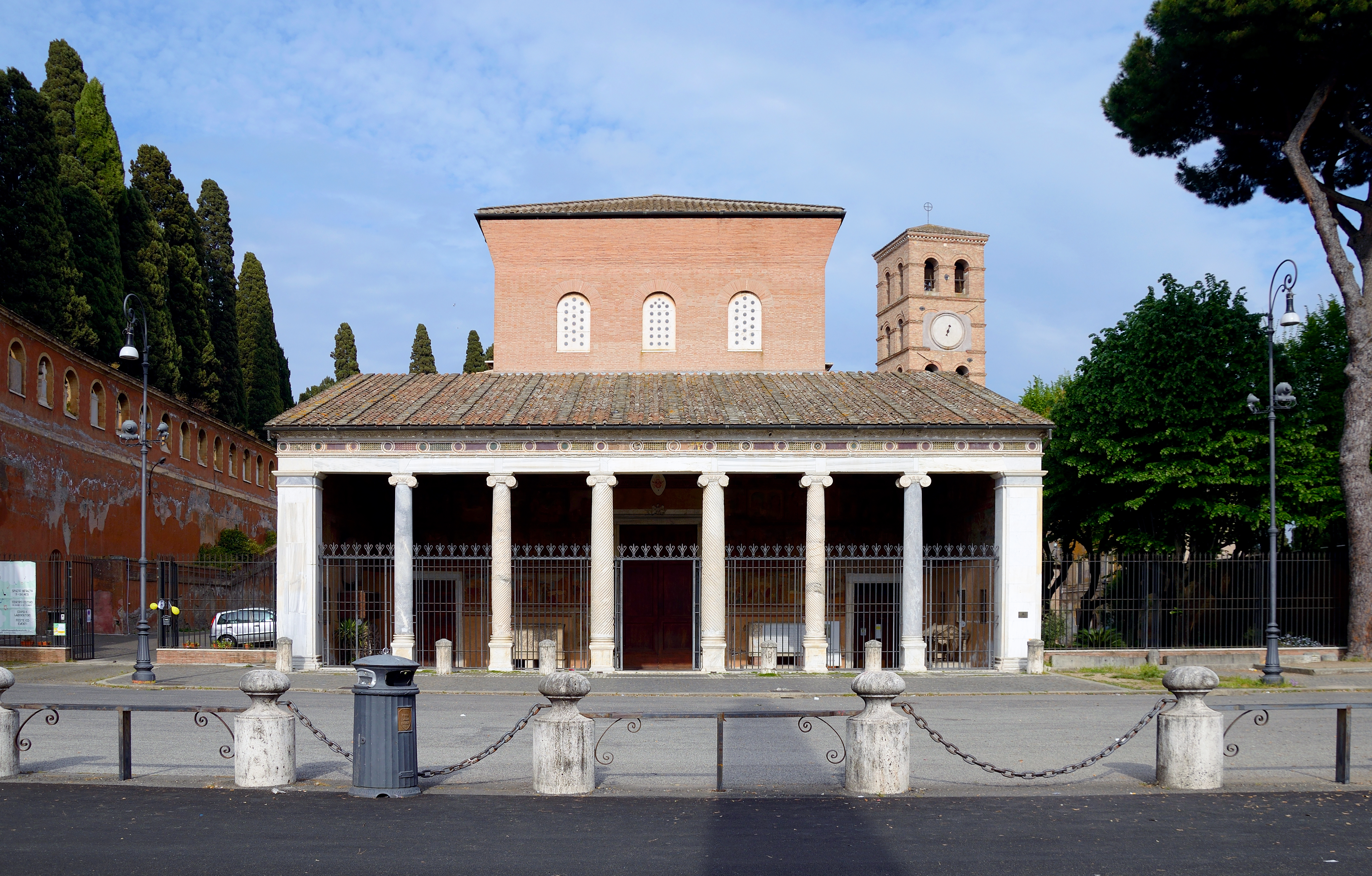
- The Basilica Papale di San Lorenzo fuori le Mura is a shrine to the martyred Roman deacon Saint Lawrence. An Allied bombing on 19 July 1943, during World War II, devastated the facade, which was subsequently rebuilt.
- Click on the map for a fullscreen view
- 41°54′09″N 12°31′14″E
- Location: Rome, Italy
- Denomination: Roman Catholic
- Religious order: Capuchin Franciscans

History
- Status: Papal minor basilica
- Dedication: St Lawrence: St Stephen; St Justin; Pope St Zosimus; Pope St Sixtus III; Pope St Hilarius; Pope Blessed Pius IX

Architecture
- Architectural type: Church
- Groundbreaking: 6th century

Specifications
- Length: 90 metres (300 ft)
- Width: 25 metres (82 ft)

Administration
- Diocese: Diocese of Rome

Clergy
- Pastor: P. Bruno Mustacchio

The Basilica Papale di San Lorenzo fuori le mura (Papal Basilica of Saint Lawrence outside the Walls) is a Roman Catholic papal minor basilica and parish church, located in Rome, Italy. The Basilica is one of the Seven Pilgrim Churches of Rome and one of the five papal basilicas (formerly called patriarchal basilicas), each of which was assigned to the care of a Latin Church patriarchate. The basilica was assigned to the Patriarchate of Jerusalem. The basilica is the shrine of the tomb of its namesake, Lawrence (sometimes spelt "Laurence"), one of the first seven deacons of Rome who was martyred in 258. Many other saints and Pope Pius IX are also buried at the Basilica, which is the centre of a large and ancient burial complex.

== History ==
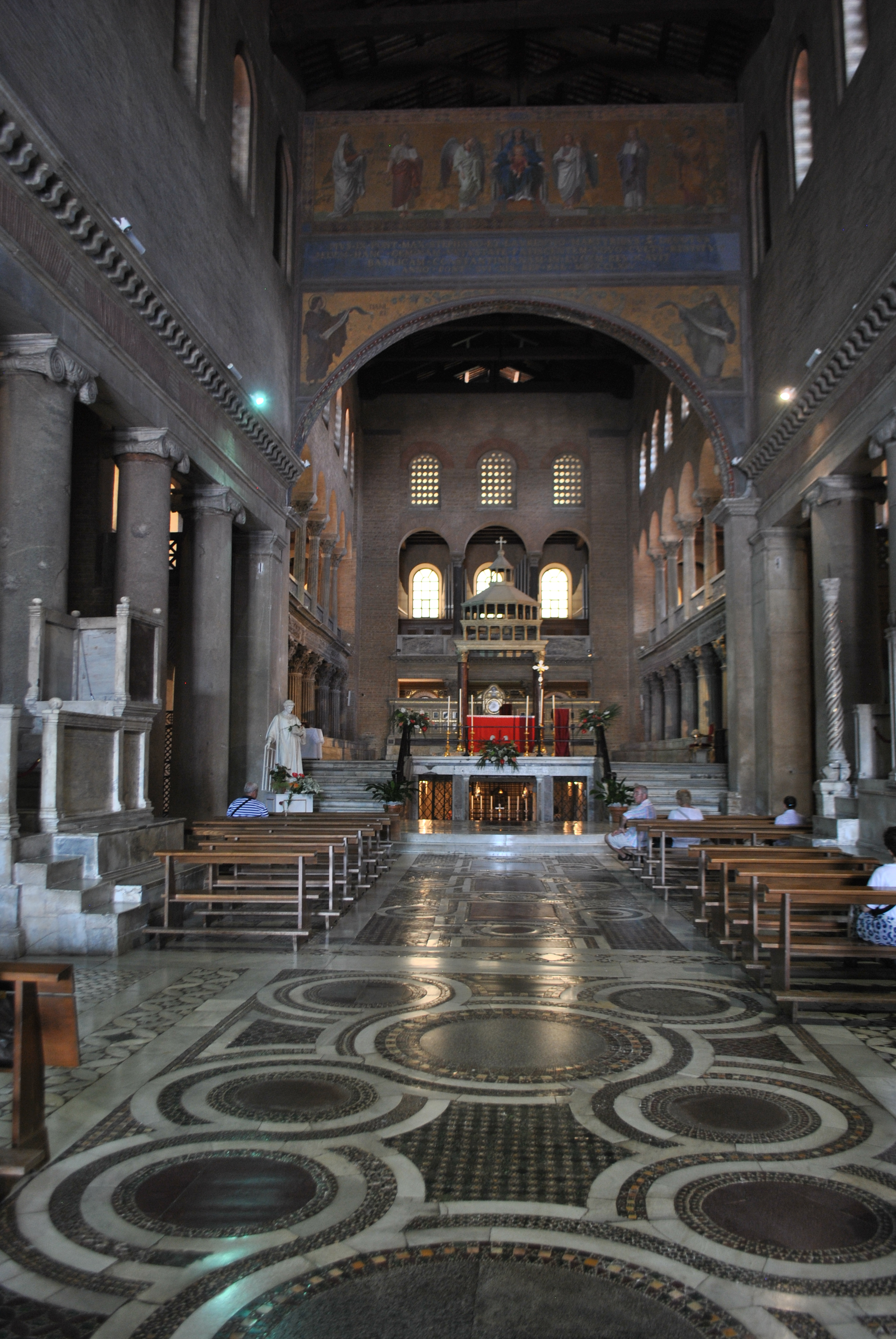
Nave

Before the present-day basilica was constructed, the former estate upon which it sits was once home to a small oratory built by Constantine I. The Emperor built the basilica over the site on which tradition held that Saint Lawrence was buried in 258.

The church was restored or rebuilt by Pope Damasus I, (r. 366-384) who had served there as a deacon.

In the 580s, Pope Pelagius II commissioned the construction of a church over the site in honour of Lawrence. In the 13th century, Pope Honorius III commissioned the construction of another church in front of the older one. Part of the nave and triumphal arch of Honorius's church were incorporated, although not perfectly aligned.

It was adorned with frescos depicting the lives of Lawrence and the first martyred deacon, Stephen, who is interred with Lawrence in the crypt, or confessio, under the high altar. Excavations have revealed several other crypts of various persons, buried below the contemporary street level. Pope Hilarius is also buried here.

The portico (c. 1220) has Cosmatesque decoration by the Vassalletto family of craftsmen. The 13th-century frescoes, which were reconstructed, depict scenes from the lives of Lawrence and Stephen, both being martyred, young deacons. There are two ancient sarcophagi in the portico: a Christian one, possibly decorated in the 7th century on an older sarcophagus, has a relief depicting putti (cherubs) picking grapes. While vines and grapes are symbols of the Holy Eucharist, these images are probably not symbols thereof. Further, two Romanesque stone lions were moved here from the old entrance.

The campanile was built in the 12th century. Immediately inside the entrance is the tomb of Cardinal Guglielmo Fieschi, who died in 1256, but was entombed in an ancient sarcophagus, itself being incidentally carved with a relief depicting a pagan marital feast.

In 1819, painter J. M. W. Turner visited San Lorenzo, where he made several sketches.

== Interior ==
Inside, the choir enclosure and pulpit have Cosmatesque decoration, and there is also a fine Cosmatesque Paschal candlestick from the 12th or 13th century. The antique Ionic capital on the column directly behind the pulpit has carvings of a frog and a lizard. On the triumphal arch are Byzantine mosaics from the 6th century, depicting Christ with saints. The confessio below the high altar is entered from the nave. Here, Lawrence and Stephen are enshrined. The latter was transferred from Constantinople by Pope Pelagius II during his restoration of the Basilica. Behind the high altar is a papal altar with an inscription of the names of the makers, namely the Cosmati family, and dating it to 1148.

In the chapel of San Tarcisio, at the end of the right nave, is a 1619 Beheading of the Baptist by Giovanni Serodine.

The basilica was home to the Latin Patriarch of Jerusalem from 1374 to 1847. A restoration was done in the mid-19th century by Virginio Vespignani.

== Reconstruction ==
In 1943, the Basilica was bombed by American planes during the Second World War. Restoration continued until 1948, allowing some accretions from the 19th century to be removed. However, the frescoes on the facade were destroyed.

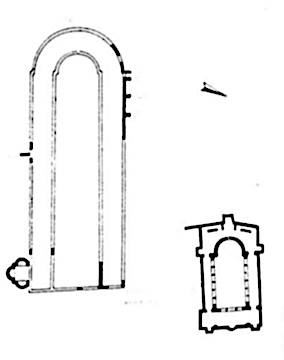
Plan of Constantinian basilica

The brick facade was completely rebuilt after the bombings.

The basilica adjoins a major cemetery named Campo Verano and therefore holds a large number of funerals.

== Burials ==
- Deacon of Rome and martyr Lawrence
- Deacon of Jerusalem and first martyr Stephen
- Pope Hilarius
- Pope Pius IX
- Italian Prime Minister Alcide De Gasperi, a founding father of the European Union
- Pope Zosimus
- Pope Sixtus III
- Pope Damasus II

== Bibliography ==
- Mondini, Daniela, S. Lorenzo fuori le mura, in: P. C. Claussan, D. Mondini, D. Senekovic, Die Kirchen der Stadt Rom im Mittelalter 1050-1300, Band 3 (G-L), Stuttgart 2010, pp. 317–527, ISBN 978-3-515-09073-5
- Webb, Matilda (2001). "San Lorenzo Fuori le Mura and Catacomb". The Churches and Catacombs of Early Christian Rome. Brighton: Sussex Academic Press. pp. 240–245. ISBN 978-1-9022-1058-2.
- Muñoz, A. La Basilica di S.Lorenzo fuori le mura. Roma 1944.
- Da Bra, G. S.Lorenzo fuori le mura. Roma 1952
- Krautheimer, Richard; Spencer Corbett; Wolfgang Frankl (1967). "S.Lorenzo fuori le mura". Corpus Basilicarum Christianarum Romae: IV-IX Cent. III. Città del Vaticano: Pontifico Instituto di Archeologia Cristiana; Institute of Fine Arts, New York University.

Preceded by Basilica of Saint Paul Outside the Walls	Landmarks of Rome; San Lorenzo fuori le mura	Succeeded by Sant'Agnese fuori le mura
