= Biblioteca Nazionale Centrale di Roma =

National library in Rome

Coordinates: 41°54′24″N 12°30′29″E

Central National Library of Rome
- Biblioteca nazionale centrale di Roma

- The Library building
- Location: Via Castro Pretorio 105, Rome, Italy
- Type: Public, national library.
- Established: 1876 (150 years ago)

Collection
- Size: 7,000,000 books, 10,000 drawings, 20,000 maps, 25,000 16th century editions, 8,000 manuscripts, 2,000 Incunabula.

Access and use
- Access requirements: Open to anyone of 18 years or older

Other information
- Director: Stefano Campagnolo
- Website: bncrm.beniculturali.it

The Biblioteca Nazionale Centrale di Roma (Central National Library of Rome), in Rome, is one of two central national libraries of Italy, along with Biblioteca Nazionale Centrale di Firenze in Florence. In total, 9 national libraries exist, out of 46 state libraries.

The library's mission is to collect and preserve all the publications in Italy and the most important foreign works, especially those related to Italy, and make them available to anyone. The collection currently includes more than 7,000,000 printed volumes, 2,000 incunabula, 25,000 cinquecentine (16th century books), 8,000 manuscripts, 10,000 drawings, 20,000 maps, and 1,342,154 brochures.

As of 1990, the catalog of the library has been online, containing information on all printed documents received to the library since that year as well as important collections obtained over time, all titles of periodical publications, and parts of monographic publications, among other notable archived items.

In order to access the Library, you need a valid Reader’s pass. This is issued by the Ufficio Accoglienza e Relazioni con il pubblico. Please bring a valid ID. Users must leave their bags, food and beverage in the cloakroom. If you need to use your own books, you must get permission from the Ufficio Accoglienza. The Library only allows entry of books not in its catalogues.

The BNCR launched several digitization projects with the purpose of enhancing its own collections and make them available to an increasing number of readers. The documents are available at: digitale.bnc.roma.sbn.it/tecadigitale.

The Library supports cultural promotion and preservation through an extensive programme of events which includes lectures, video projections, concerts, art exhibitions and guided tours. Authors, publishers, bookshops, libraries, cultural associations are all welcome.

There are three public exhibition spaces in the hall of the building. Firstly, Museo Spazi900 dedicated to contemporary italian literature. La stanza di Elsa is at the very heart of the museum. It is here that Elsa Morante’s studio was recreated with its original furniture. Secondly, La grande Biblioteca d’Italia: bibliotecari, architetti e artisti all’opera: 1975-2015 is a permanent exhibition that celebrates the 40th anniversary of BNCR reopening and the 50th anniversary from the start of its construction in Castro Pretorio. Lastly, the third area hosts temporary exhibitions that exhibit the precious resources preserved by the Library.

From July 2021, in the “Biblioteca del Novecento letterario italiano Enrico Falqui” readers can visit the Sala Italo Calvino, where furniture, objects and paintings retrieved from the apartment Calvino lived in at Piazza di Campo Marzio during the latter years of his life.

Guided tours of the library are also available.

== History ==
The predecessor of the present Biblioteca Nazionale was the Jesuit Bibliotheca Secreta, located at the Jesuit Collegio Romano, where members of the Society of Jesus had been accumulating in Papal Rome an enormous bibliographic and documentary wealth since their order's foundation in 1540 . As indicated by its name - "Secret Library" - this material was at the time not accessible to the general public, not even to non-Jesuit Catholic clergy. With the Unification of Italy and the Capture of Rome in 1870, ending the Catholic Church's Temporal Power, this library was taken over by the new Kingdom of Italy and made into the core of the Biblioteca Nazionale Centrale di Roma, inaugurated on 14 March 1876 - to which enormous additional material was subsequently added. In its early years the library remained housed at the original Jesuit premises. One century later the library moved to its present location. The current building was designed by architects Massimo Castellazzi, Tullio Dell'Anese and Annibale Vitellozzi and opened in January 1975.

== See also ==
- Books in Italy
- List of libraries in Italy

== Bibliography ==
- Franca Arduini (1990). "The Two National Central Libraries of Florence and Rome". Libraries & Culture. 25 (3): 383–405. JSTOR 25542277.
