= Collatino =

Q. XXII Collatino
- Quartiere of Rome
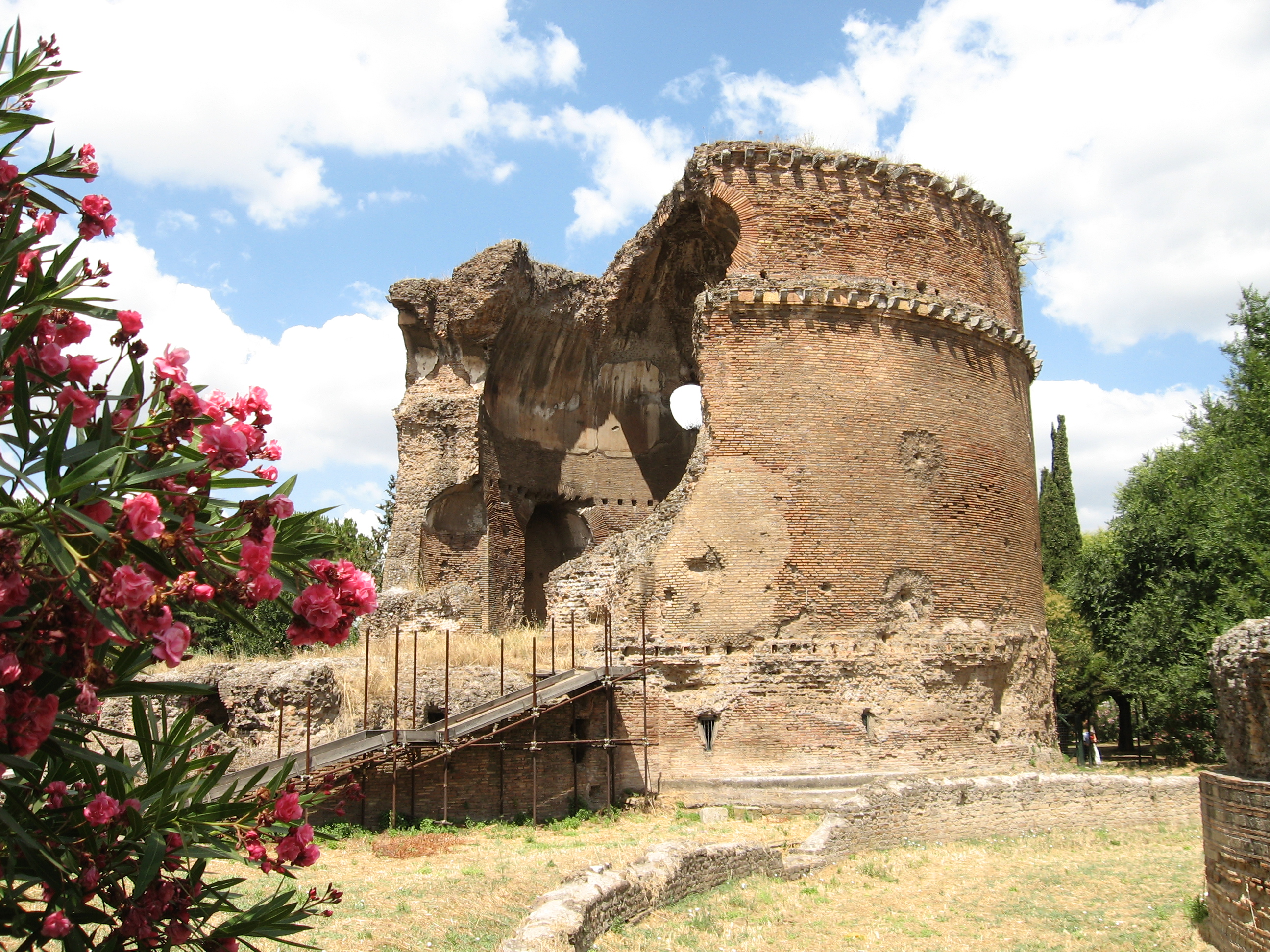
- Mausoleum of Villa Gordiani

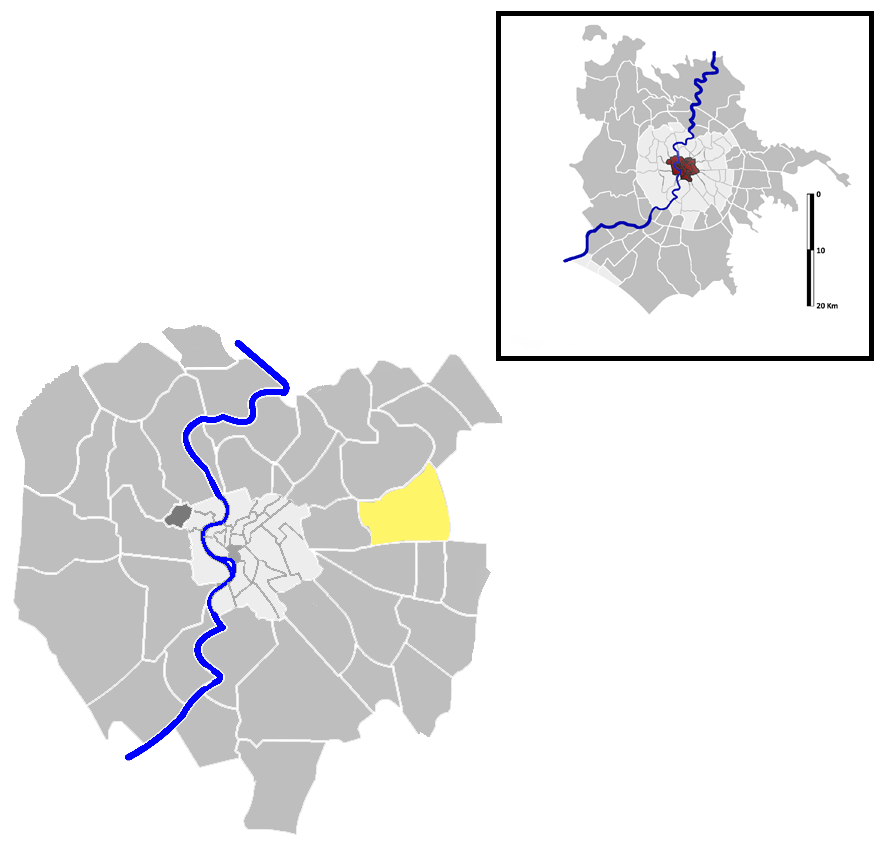
- Position of the quartiere within the city of Rome
- Country: Italy
- Region: Lazio
- Metropolitan City: Rome
- Comune: Rome
- Municipio: Municipio IV; Municipio V
- Established: 13 September 1961

Area
  - Total: 2.38 sq mi (6.16 km^{2})
- Time zone: UTC+1 (CET)
  - Summer (DST): UTC+2 (CEST)

Collatino is the 22nd quartiere of Rome (Italy), identified by the initials Q. XXII. It belongs to the Municipio IV and V. The name is derived from the Via Collatina. It has 66,829 inhabitants and has an area of 6.1646 km^{2}.

It forms the zone urban zone designated with the code 15.b, with 30,362 inhabitants in January 2010.
