= Madonna Della Strada (disambiguation) =

Madonna della Strada may refer to:

- Madonna Della Strada icon in the Church of the Gesù in Rome
- Madonna Della Strada Chapel in Chicago
- Marian sanctuary in Roggiano Gravina, Italy
- Madonna della Strada (Scoppito), a hamlet in the Province of L'Aquila, Italy
- Santa Maria della Strada, an abbey in the Province of Campobasso, Italy
