= Via Claudia Nova =

Roman road, built in 47 AD by the Roman emperor Claudius

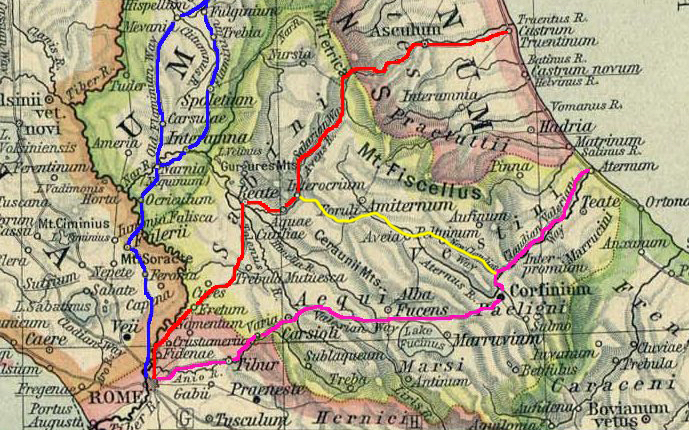
Via Claudia Nova (in yellow)

The Via Claudia Nova was an ancient Roman road, built in 47 AD by the Roman emperor Claudius to connect the Via Caecilia with the Via Valeria in central Italy.

There is no precise information about the road's route: according to some sources, it started from Amiternum, while for others it began at Civitatomassa, currently a frazione of Scoppito. It joined the Via Claudia Valeria near Popoli, at the confluence of the Tirino and Aterno rivers. It passed, among the others, through the ancient cities of Peltuinum, and Ocriticum, where a temple dedicated to Jupiter existed.

== Sources ==
- Le strade dell'Italia romana. Touring Club Italiano. 2004. p. 106.
