= Via Tiburtina =

Ancient road in Italy

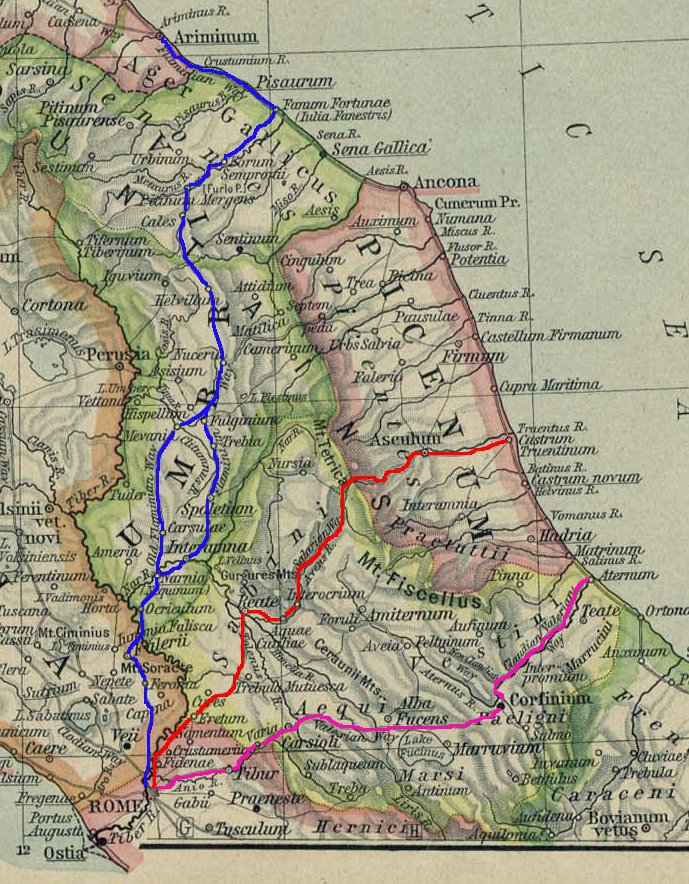
The three Roman roads from Rome to the Adriatic Sea: Via Flaminia, Via Salaria and Via Tiburtina (the southernmost)

Via Tiburtina is an ancient road in Italy leading east-northeast from Rome to Tivoli (Latin: Tibur) and then, with the Via Valeria, on to Pescara (Latin: Aternum).

== Historical road ==
It was probably built by the Roman censor Marcus Valerius Maximus in 307 BC at the time of the conquest of the Aequi territory and later lengthened, probably in about 154 BC, by Marcus Valerius Messalla to the territories of the Marsi and the Aequi in the Abruzzo, as Via Valeria. Its total length was approximately 200 km from Rome to Aternum (the modern Pescara). It exited Rome through the Aurelian Walls at the Porta Tiburtina, and through the Servian Wall at the Porta Esquilina.

Historians assert that the Via Tiburtina must have come into existence as a trail during the establishment of the Latin League. It is difficult to determine the part of the course from Albulae Aquae to Tibur. Though afterward it became an important thoroughfare, the extension of the Via Tiburtina beyond Tibur always retained its original name of Via Valeria.

=== Roman bridges ===
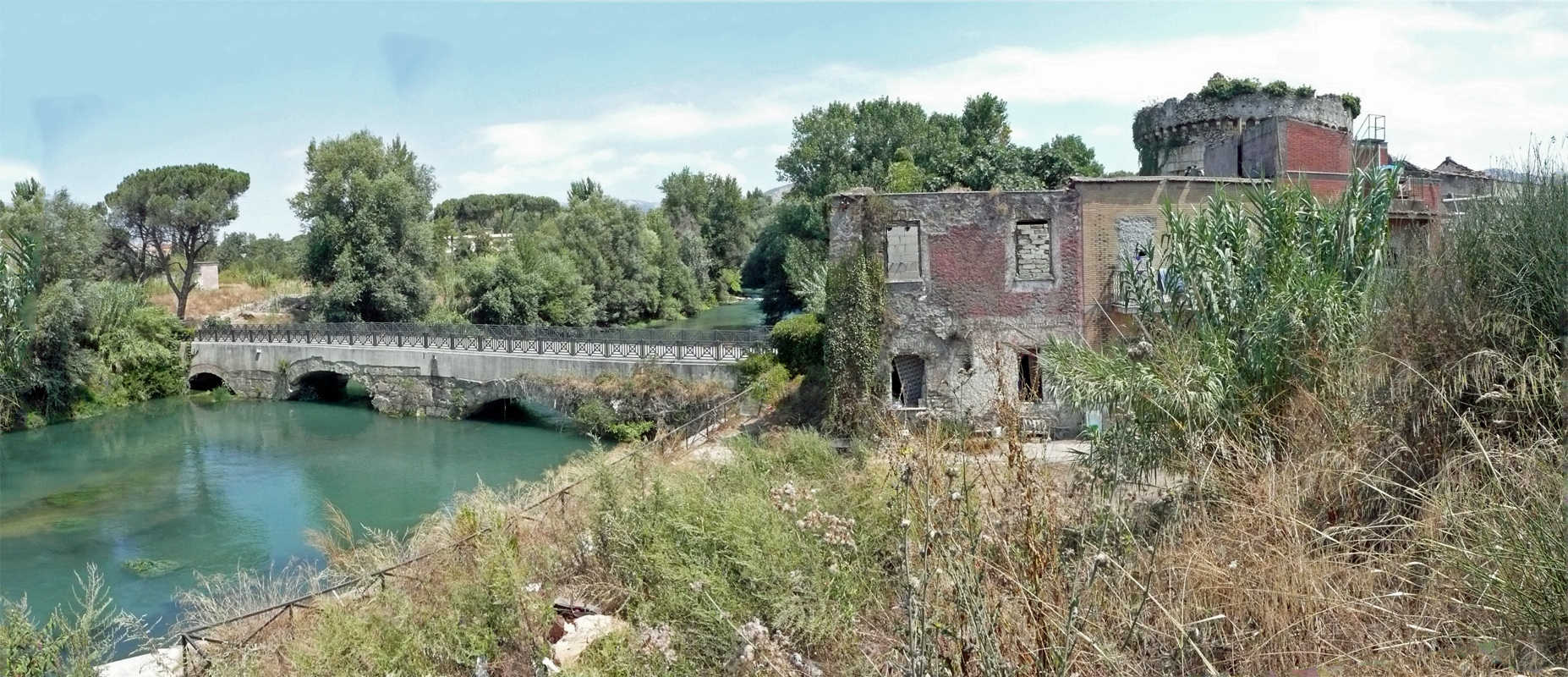
Ponte Lucano

There are the remains of several Roman bridges along the road, including the Ponte Lucano and Ponte Mammolo.

== Contemporary road ==
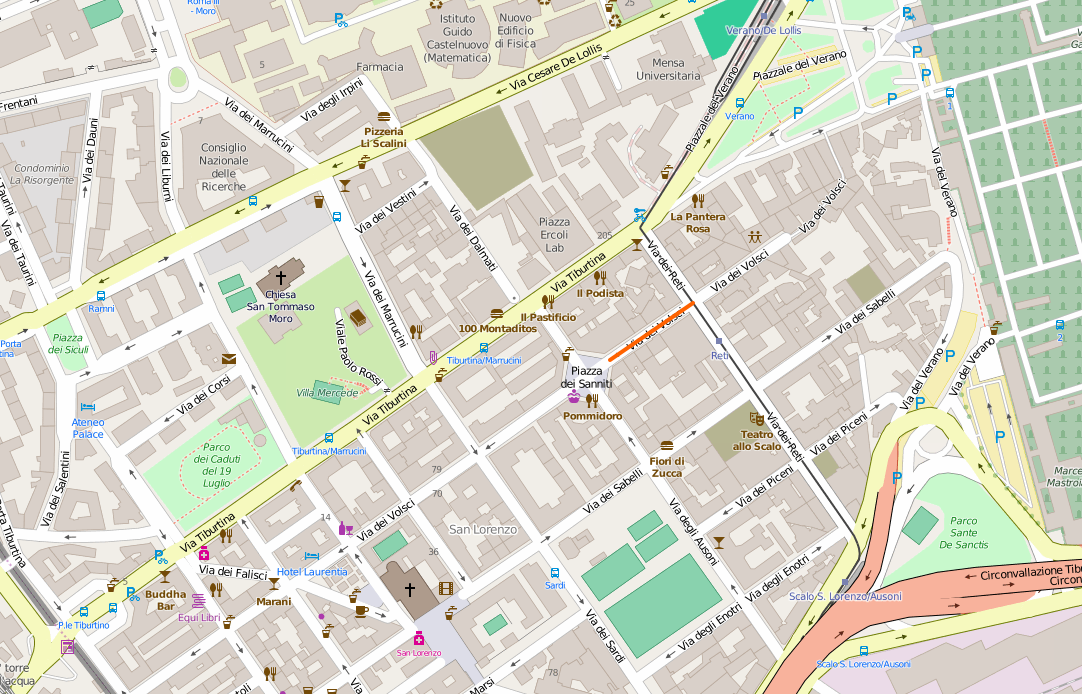
OpenStreetMap of the first section of Via Tiburtina

A former state road with the same name exists today and follows the same path.

== See also ==
- Roman road
- Roman bridge
- Roman engineering
- Via Valeria
- Catacomb of Sant'Ippolito
