= Aternum =

Ancient Roman town

Coordinates: 42.4601°N 14.2100°E

- Ostia Aterni
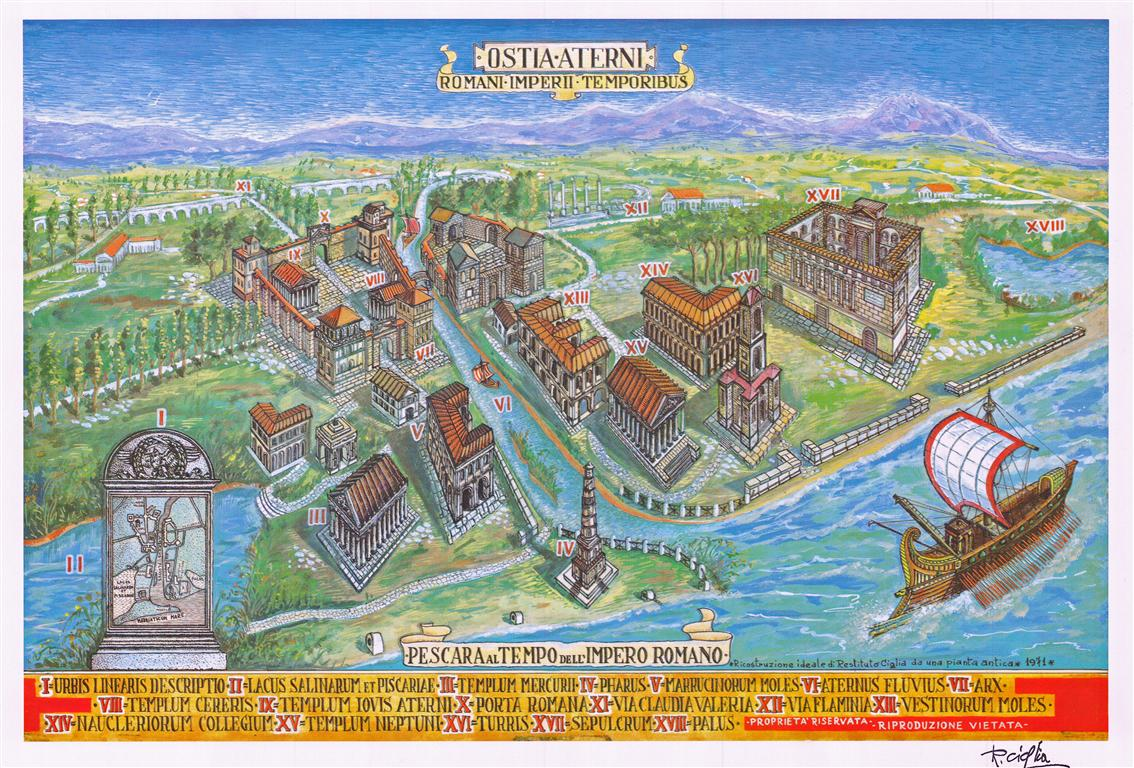
- Graphic reconstruction of Aternum

- Location within Italy
- Type: Settlement and port
- Cultures: Vestinian, Roman, Byzantine
- Location: Modern-day Italy (Pescara)
- Region: Samnium

History
- Built: Before 4th century BC

Site notes
- Condition: In ruins
- Public access: Yes

Aternum was a Roman town, on the site of Pescara, in Italy. Some historians also refer to Aternum with the name of Ostia Aterni, due to its location at the mouth of the river Aternus. Being connected to Rome through the Via Tiburtina and its extension the Via Valeria, Aternum played a crucial role in connecting the capital to the Eastern provinces of the Empire. Its harbour, largely occupied by commercial and fishing ships, was supposedly also used for military purposes.

The main building was the temple of Jovis Aternium but there are traces of other temples dedicated to Roman and even Egyptian divinities. Moreover, there are reports about the construction of a monumental bridge by the emperor Tiberius.
