= Peltuinum =

Former Roman town

Coordinates: 42°17′09″N 13°37′13″E

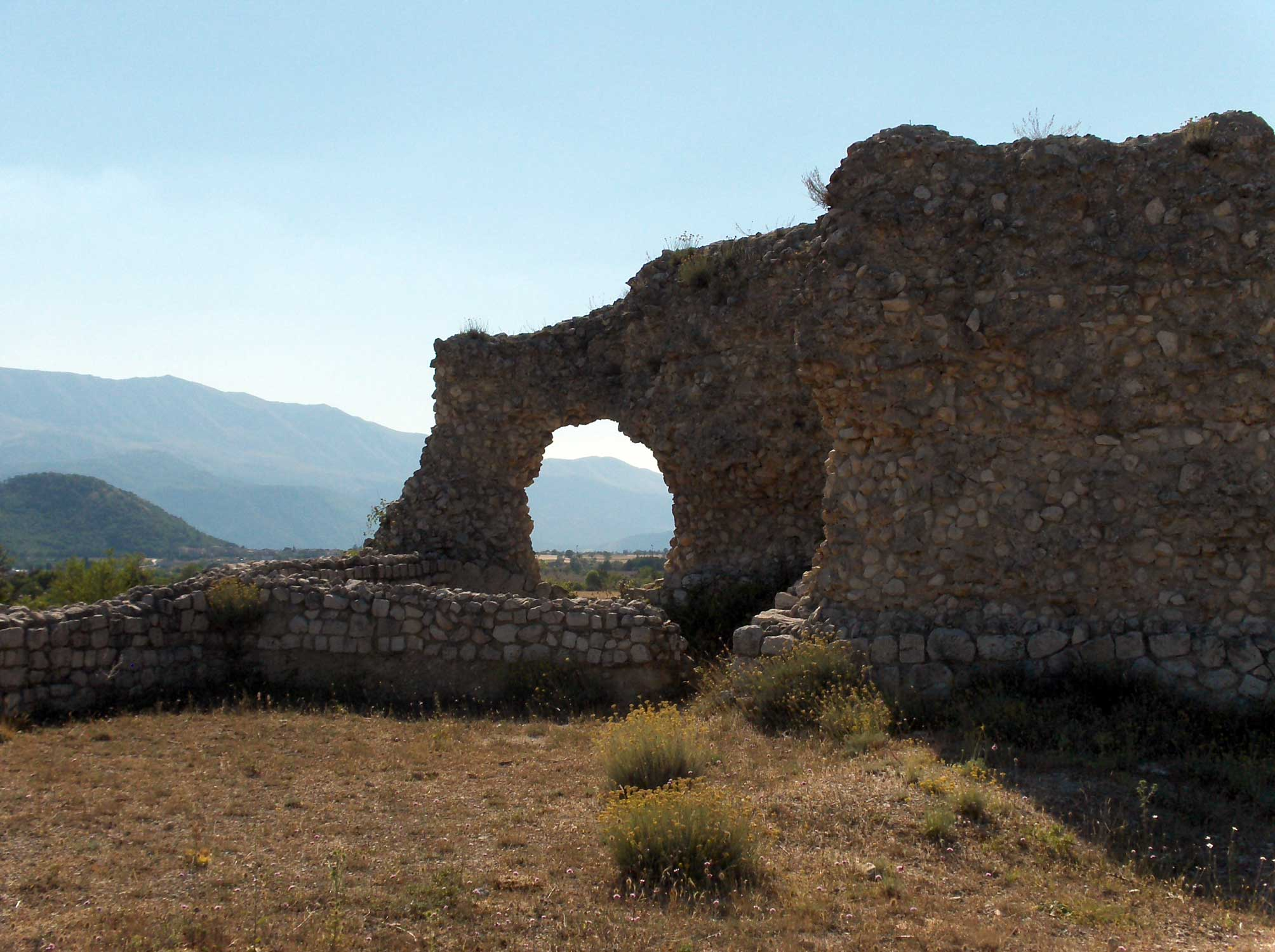
- Part of the remaining town wall.
- Interactive map of Peltuinum
- Type: Settlement
- Periods: Roman Republic - Byzantine Empire
- Cultures: Ancient Rome
- Location: Prata d'Ansidonia, Province of L'Aquila, Abruzzo, Italy

Site notes
- Public access: yes
- Website: https://www.peltuinum.org

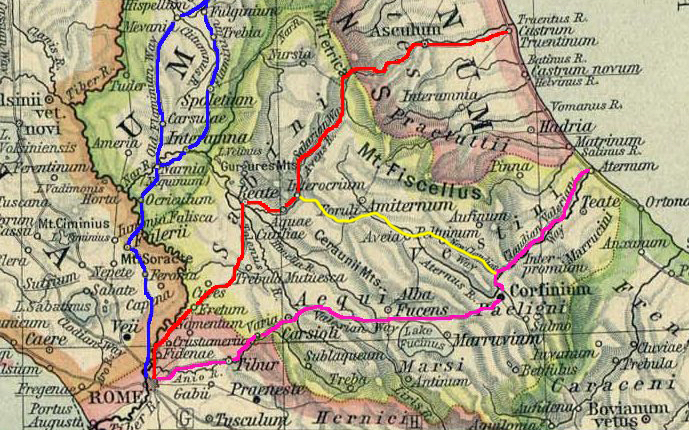
Via Claudia Nova (in yellow)

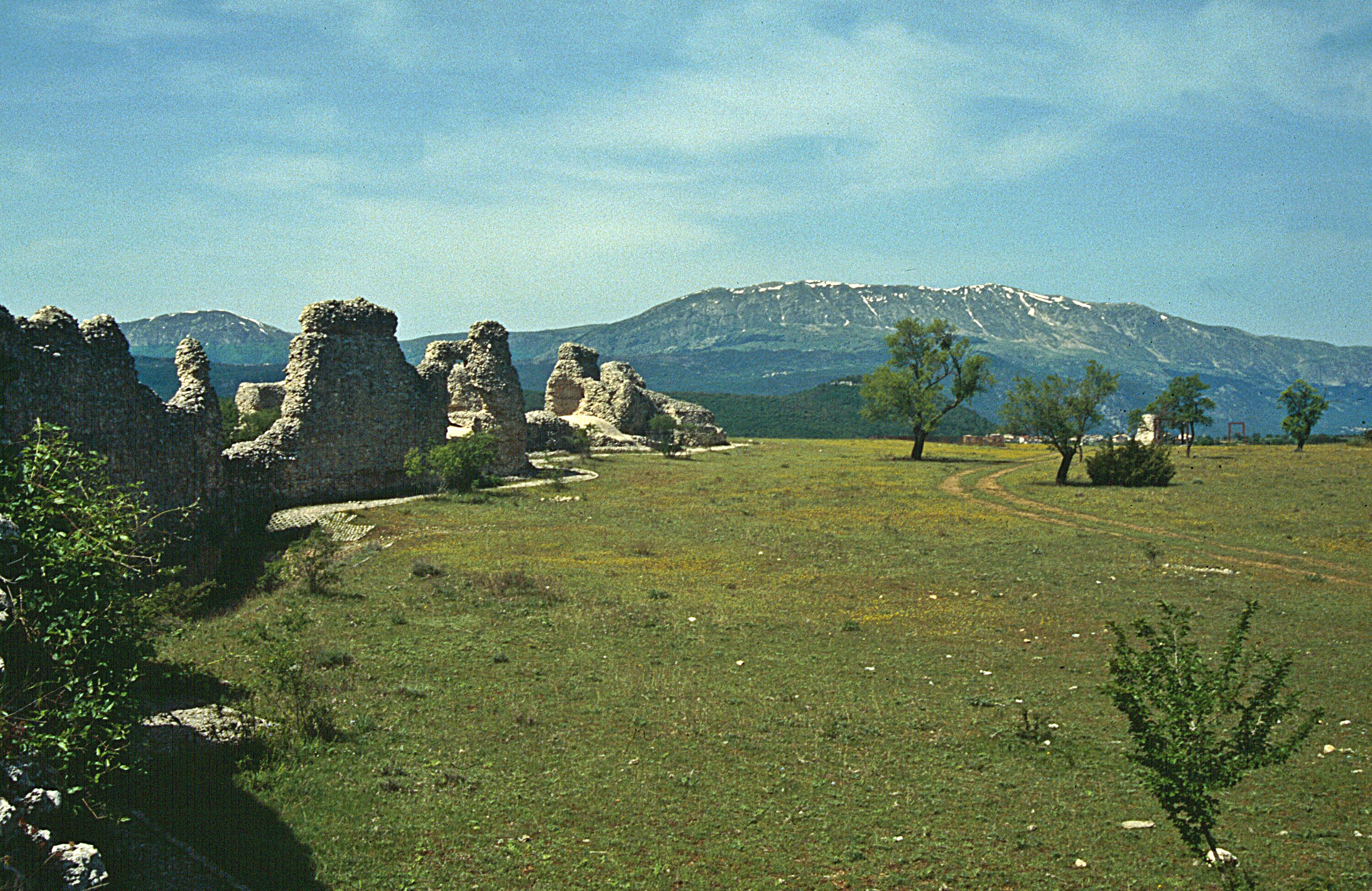
City walls

Peltuinum was a Roman town of the Vestini, on the ancient Via Claudia Nova, 20 km east of L'Aquila, Italy, between the modern-day settlements of Prata d'Ansidonia and Castelnuovo.

It was apparently the chief town of that portion of the Vestini who dwelt west of the main Apennine chain. Remains of the town walls, of an amphitheatre, of a temple and of other buildings still exist. The city was the birthplace of Gnaeus Domitius Corbulo, a Roman general from the age of Nero.

== History ==
=== Roman age ===
The foundation of Peltuinum was in the middle of the 1st century BC. At the turn of the first century AD the city wall and a monumental sanctuary area were built of which excavations have brought to light a temple and a theatre.

In 47 AD the L'Aquila-Foggia road from Sabina towards the market centres of Arpi and Lucera was structured as via Claudia Nova with the consequent monumentalisation of the stretch that crossed the town.

=== Late Antiquity and Middle Ages ===
Ancient sources mention a strong earthquake in the 5th century that affected Rome as well as a large part of central Italy, and the earthquake of 443 damaged Peltuinum. The population began to abandon the city, also due to the wars that increasingly marked the weakness of the Empire. The community moved towards more defensible areas and the main buildings of the city were used as quarries.

During the Greek-Gothic war the territory of Peltuinum, like that of nearby Alba Fucens, were the sites of Byzantine camps of general Belisarius.

== The site ==
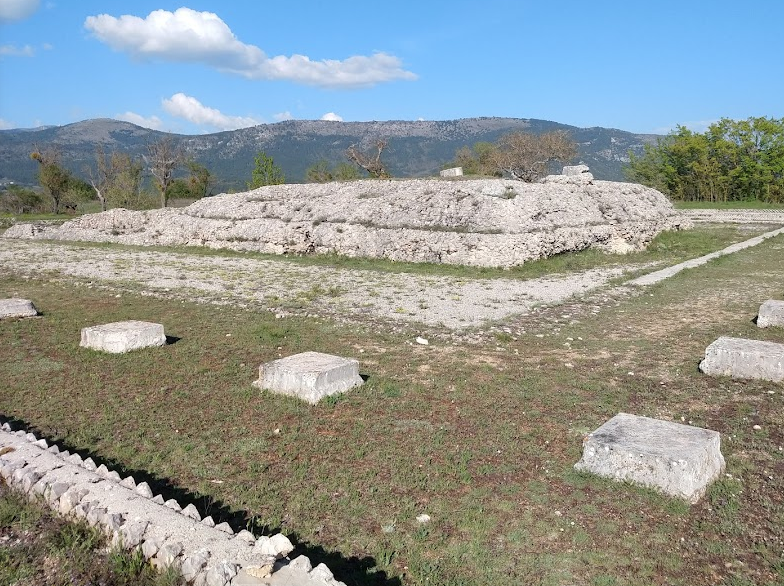
Sanctuary of Peltuinum

Peltuinum stands on a plateau over 100 m above the surroundings. The walled area has an area of about 26 hectares. The centre is crossed east to west by the via Claudia Nova.

=== The walls ===
The walls are along the edge of a slope with a plinth in opus incertum. The double-arched west gate is the only one that is preserved. After the Romans it was used as a control gate for the passage of livestock and between the towers is a space for the customs offices. The customs function was maintained for centuries.

=== Sanctuary ===
The temple overlooked the square and was a Corinthian hexastyle prostyle, with three columns on the extension of the doors and a cella with a colonnade of perhaps two orders, with the base for the cult statue on the back wall.

The cella of the temple was built above a spring which must have been a sacred element in the Vestine period.

The discovery of a fragmentary votive table with the dedication APELLUNE (= Apollini), reused as the threshold of one of the shops facing via Claudia Nova, in the central area of the city, has led to the hypothesis that the temple was dedicated to Apollo.

The temple is framed by a U-shaped portico, on a single level and with a double nave with a spine colonnade. The fourth side, the northern one, is enclosed by walls which join the portico to the temple at the level of the pronaos. There were two entrances on the northern side of the portico (the side facing the forum square) and two at the southernmost point of the east and west arms.

=== Theatre ===
The theatre used the hillside for part of the seating and only the southern sector was supported by radial walls. The theatre was damaged by minor earthquakes.
