= Scoppito =

- Comune
- Comune di Scoppito
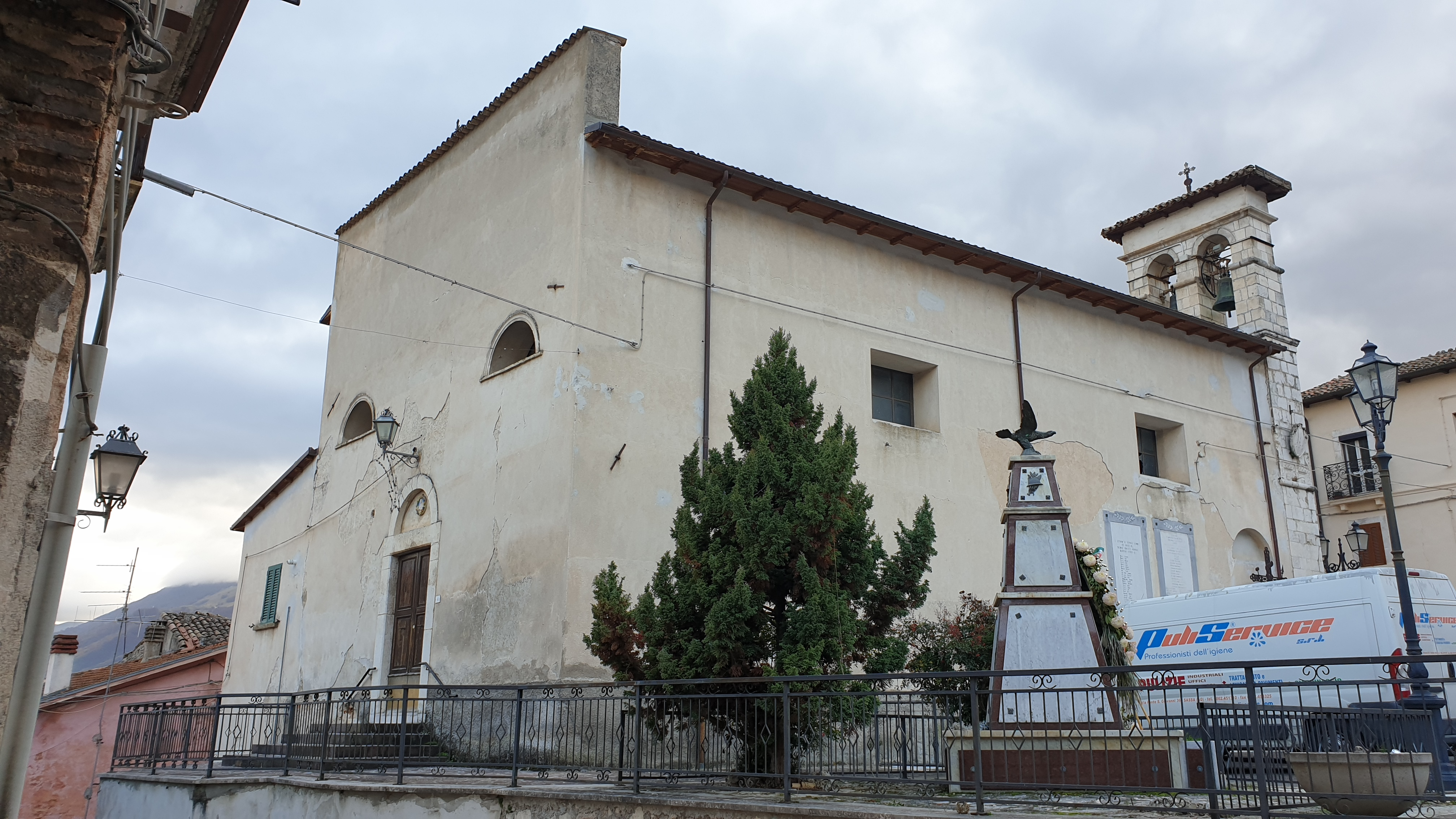

- Coat of arms

- Location within Italy Location within Abruzzo
- Coordinates: 42°22′26″N 13°51′21″E
- Country: Italy
- Region: Abruzzo
- Province: L'Aquila (AQ)
- Frazioni: Scoppito, Civitatomassa, Collettara, Santa Dorotea, Santa Maria, Casale, Forcellette, Cave, Vallinsù, Cupoli, Ponte San Giovanni, Madonna della Strada, Vigliano, Sella di Corno

Government
  - Mayor: Marco Giusti (Ind.)

Area
  - Total: 53.02 km^{2} (20.47 sq mi)
- Elevation: 820 m (2,690 ft)

Population (01/01/2022)
  - Total: 3,767
  - Density: 71.05/km^{2} (184.0/sq mi)
- Demonym: Scoppitani
- Time zone: UTC+1 (CET)
  - Summer (DST): UTC+2 (CEST)
- Postal code: 67019
- Dialing code: 0862
- Saint day: July 25
- Website: Official website

Scoppito (Sabino: Scuppìtu) is a comune and town in the province of L'Aquila, within the central Italy's region of Abruzzo.

== Sports ==
=== S.P.D. Amiternina ===
S.P.D. Amiternina is an Italian association football club, based in this city.

In the season 2011–12 the team was promoted for the first time, from Eccellenza Abruzzo to Serie D after.

Its colors are yellow and red.

== Transport ==
Scoppito has a stop on the Terni–Sulmona railway, with trains to Terni, Rieti and L'Aquila.

== See also ==
- Madonna della Strada
