= Via Valeria =

Ancient Roman road of Italy

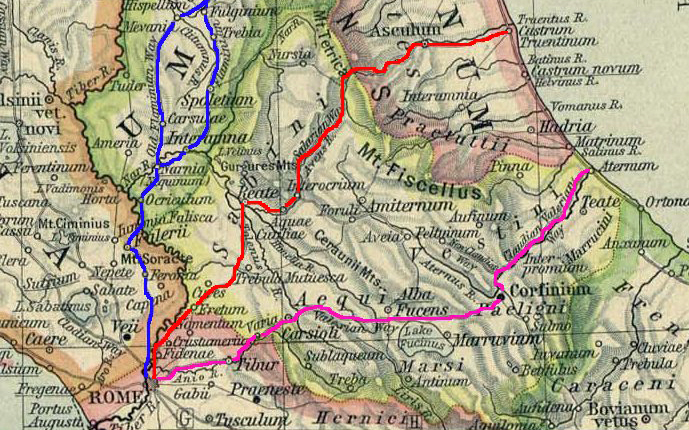
Via Tiburtina/Valeria in pink

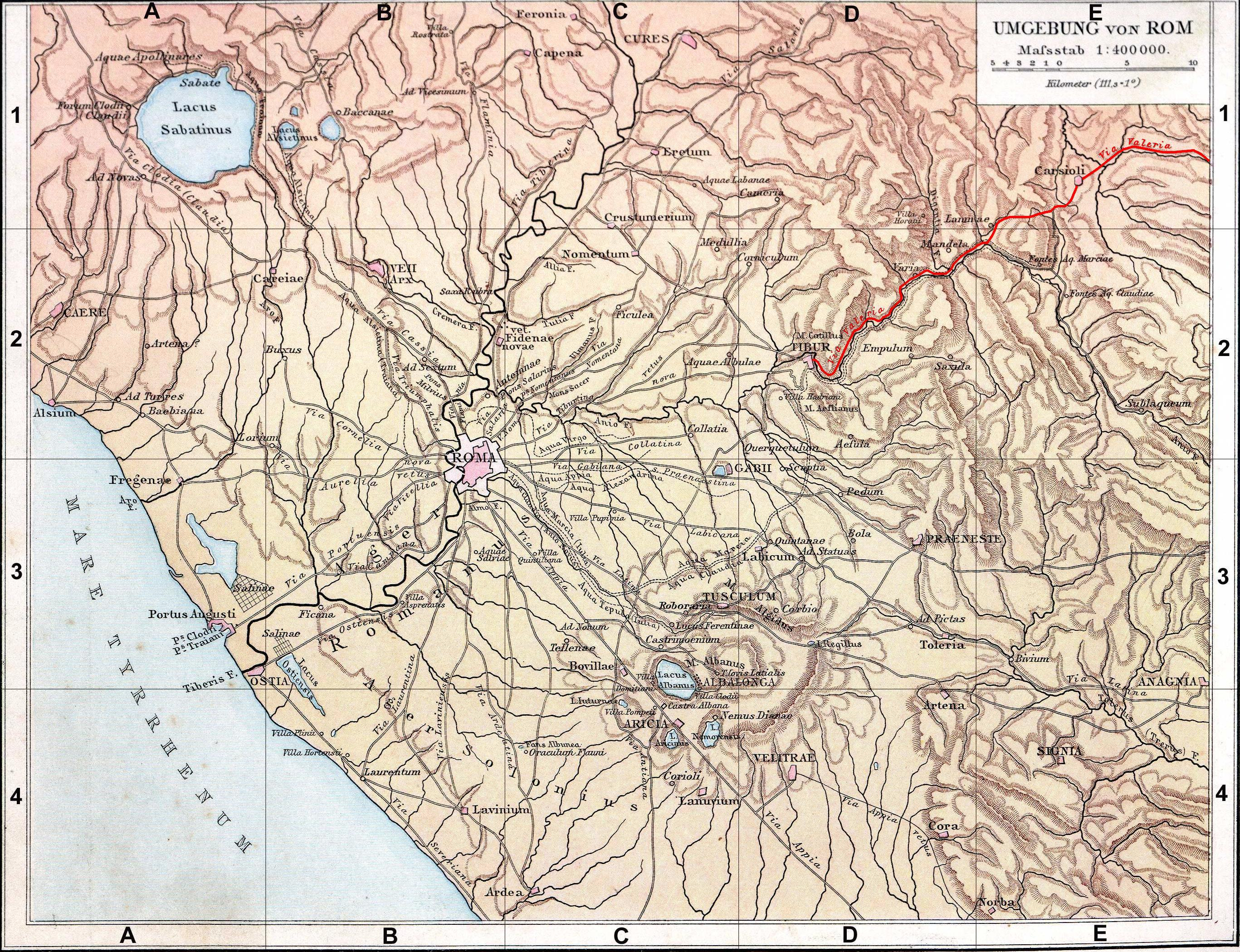
Via Valeria

The Via Valeria was an ancient Roman road of Italy, the continuation north-eastwards of the Via Tiburtina from Tibur. It probably owed its origin to Marcus Valerius Messalla, censor in 154 BC. A second Via Valeria, the Via Valeria of Sicily, connected Messina and Siracusa on the island of Sicily.

== The route ==
It ran first up the Anio Valley past Varia, and then leaving the Anio at the 36th mile, where the Via Sublacensis joined it, ascended to Carsoli and to the lofty pass of Monte Bove, whence it descended again to the valley occupied by the Lake Fucino in Roman times. It is doubtful whether, before Claudius, the Via Valeria ran farther than Cerfennia, the eastern point of the territory of the Marsi, to the northeast of Lake Fucino. Strabo states that in his day it went as far as Corfinium, and this important place must have been accessible from Rome, but probably beyond Cerfennia only by a track.

At the Roman statio ad Lamnas (at Cineto Romano), it split into two routes, the Valeria vetus and Valeria nova, which reunited near Riofreddo. The vetus was older as it was a military road that later became a more difficult shortcut when the nova became the longer but easier main road.

On the prolongation beyond Cerfennia, a milestone (Corp. Inscr. Lat. IX. 5973) states that in 48-49 AD Claudius made the Via Claudia Valeria from Cerfennia to the mouth of the Aternus (the site of modern Pescara). This difficult part of the road to the valley of the Aternus involved a drop of nearly 300 m and the crossing of the main ridge of the Apennines by the modern Forca Caruso. From Popoli, the road followed the valley of the Aternus to its mouth, and there joined the coast-road at Pescara. Claudius also constructed a road, the Via Claudia Nova, connecting the Via Salaria to the Via Valeria near the modern Popoli. This road was continued south to Isernia.

Pope Gregory XVI referred to a diversion of the river Aniene under the Via Valeria in his plans for infrastructure work to avert the risk of the river flooding.

The modern railway from Rome to Castellammare Adriatico closely follows the line of the Via Valeria.

Since 2000 the Ponte Scutonico, the most important and well-preserved monument of the Via Valeria in the Aniene valley which had been buried after floods and landslides, has been excavated with the enhancement of the stretch of road belonging to it leading to a considerable advance in knowledge. It was probably built under Nerva (r. 96–8) along with enhancement of the road.

== Via Valeria of Sicily ==
A second Via Valeria, the Via Valeria of Sicily, connected Messina and Siracusa ("Syracuse"). Hardly widened or improved until the nineteenth century, it remained the backbone of the Ionian drainage basin of Sicily, favouring the development of cities along it: Messina, Taormina, Giardini-Naxos, Giarre, Acireale, Catania, Augusta, and Siracusa. Today, Route 114 follows it in part.

== Roman bridges ==
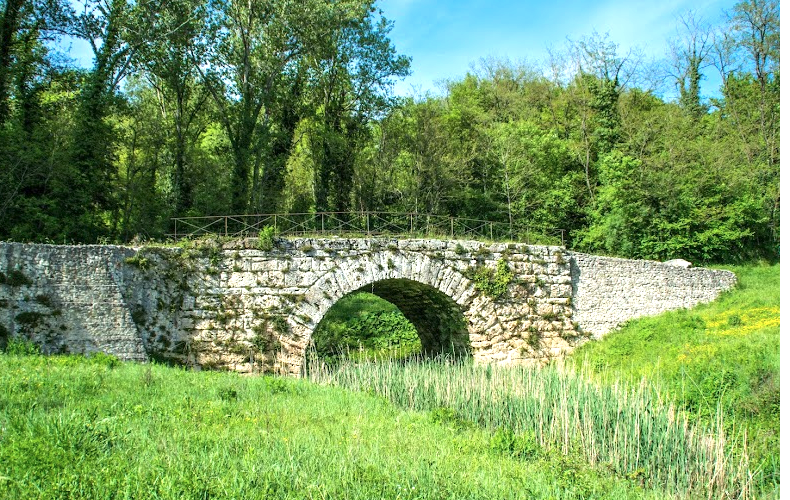
Ponte Scutonico

There are the remains of at least two Roman bridges along the road, which are the Ponte San Giorgio and the Ponte Scutonico.

== See also ==
- Roman road
- Roman bridge
- Roman engineering
