= Santa Maria della Strada =

Abbey in Matrice, Italy

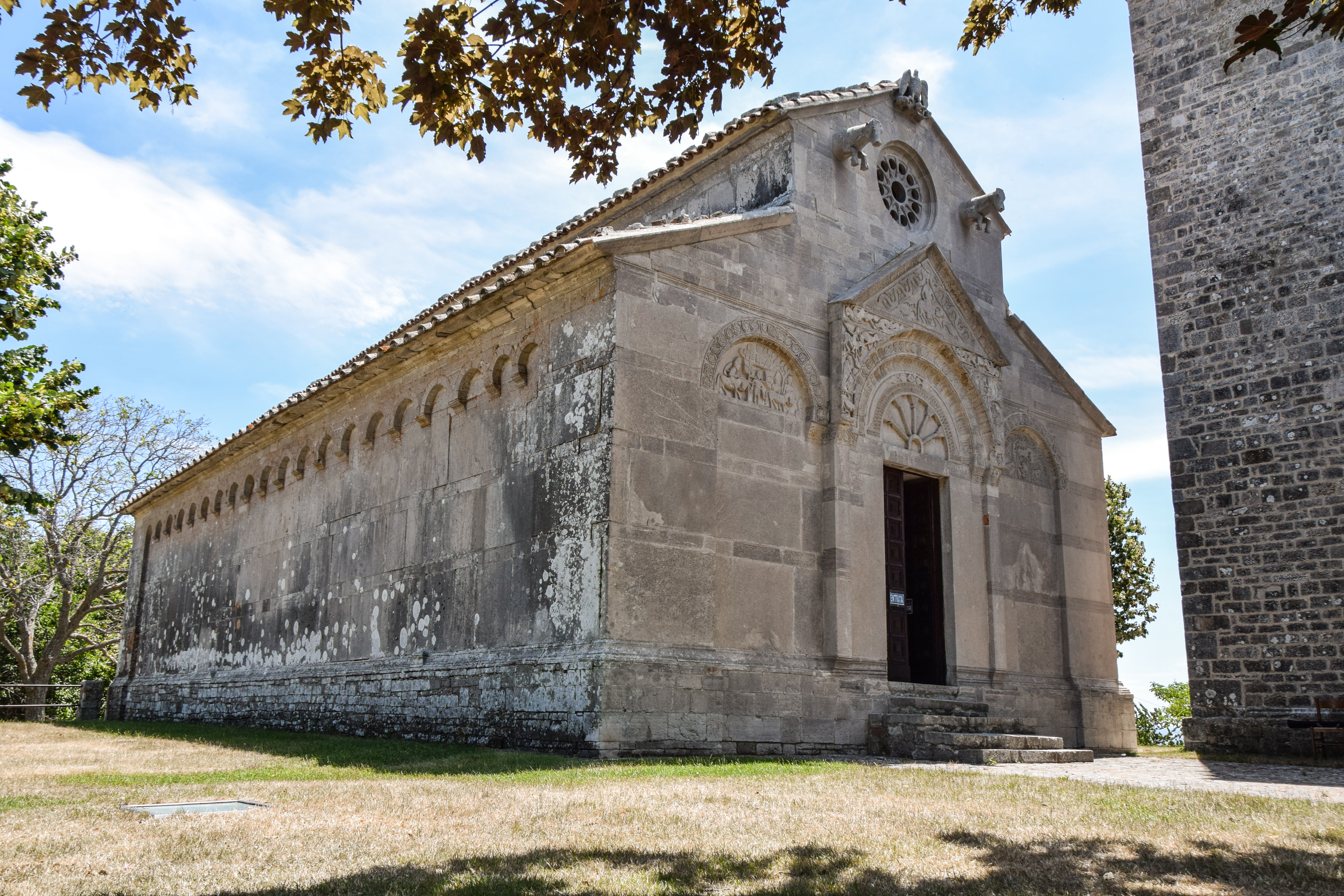
Exterior view

Santa Maria della Strada (English: Our Lady of the Way) is a former abbey in the commune of Matrice, Campobasso. The date of the construction of the abbey is unknown, but it was consecrated in August 1148, by Pietro II, Archbishop of Benevento. In 1153, it appears in a list of churches and monasteries under the jurisdiction of Pietro II produced for Pope Anastasius IV. The first Abbott may have been called Landulfus, as "Abbas Landulfus" was inscribed on a paving stone within the church. Nazzarius is named as Abbott in a document of 1176. Its foundation has historically been linked to the monastery of Santa Sofia in Benevento, but there is no evidence to support this claim. It is possible that the great abbey at Monte Cassino was involved, but the fact that the abbey is not listed as a subject house in medieval documents casts doubt upon this claim. The similarly named Santa Maria de Strata appears in a register of the Abbey's possessions, but it is believed that this refers to a separate monastery in the vicinity of San Germano.
