= Madonna della Strada, Scoppito =

Coordinates: 42°20′50″N 13°15′29″E

Madonna della Strada
- Frazione
- Interactive map of Madonna della Strada
- Country: Italy
- Region: Abruzzo
- Province: L'Aquila
- Commune: Scoppito
- Time zone: UTC+1 (CET)
  - Summer (DST): UTC+2 (CEST)

Madonna della Strada is a hamlet (frazione) of Scoppito, in the Province of L'Aquila, Italy.

== Geography ==
The village is situated on the national road "SS 17". The southern part of it belongs to the municipality of Tornimparte.
