= List of streets in Rome =

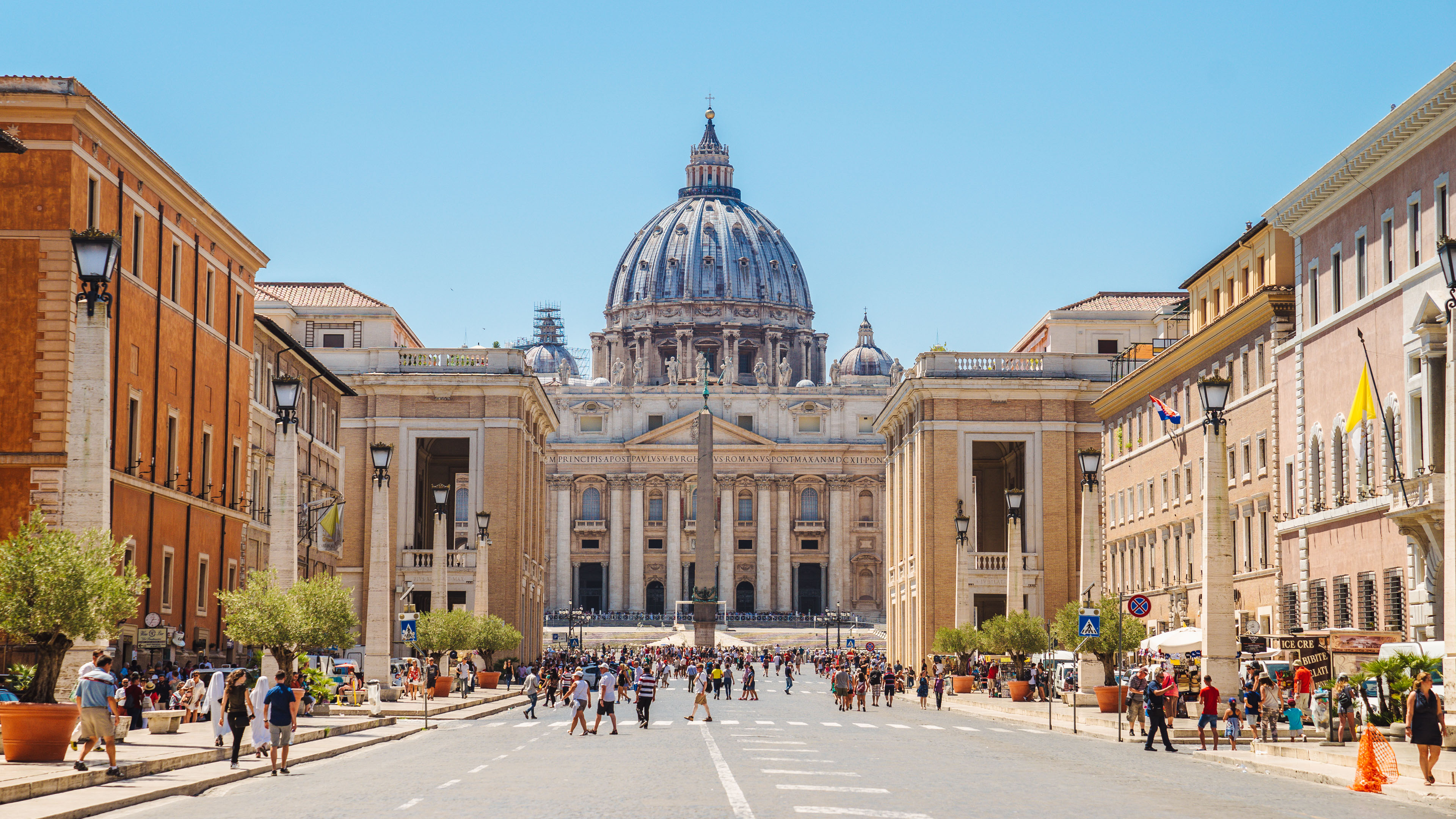
A view from the Via della Conciliazione. Note that the dome of the Basilica is not centred, as Piacentini chose instead to centre on the obelisk, which had been moved on the orders of Sixtus V.

This article covers some of the main streets in Rome, Italy.

== Via Cavour, Rome ==
Via Cavour, Rome is a street in the Castro Pretorio rione of Rome, named after Camillo Cavour. It is served by the Rome Metro stations Cavour and Termini.

== Via della Conciliazione ==
Via della Conciliazione (Conciliation Street) is a major street in the Rione of Borgo, leading to St. Peter's Basilica and the Vatican City. Around 500 m in length, it connects Saint Peter's Square to the Castel Sant'Angelo on the western bank of the Tiber River. The road was constructed between 1937 and 1950, and it is the primary access route to the Square. In addition to shops and residences, it is bordered by a number of historical and religious buildings and palaces – including the Palazzo Torlonia, the Palazzo dei Penitenzieri and the Palazzo dei Convertendi, and the church of Santa Maria in Traspontina.

== Via del Corso ==
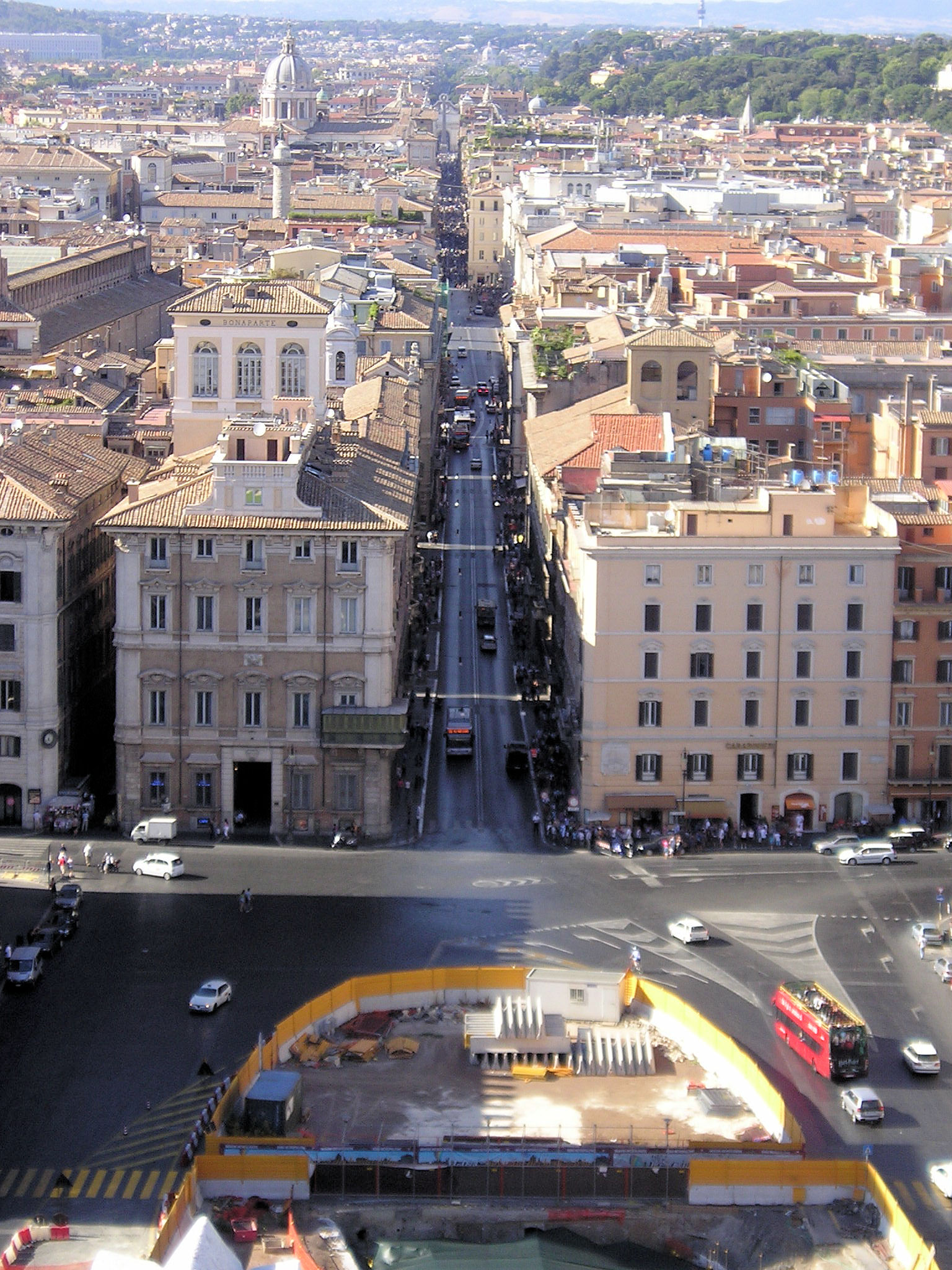
Via del Corso seen from Altare della Patria.

Via del Corso (the ancient via Lata), commonly known as the Corso, is the main street running through the historical centre of the city. It is remarkable for being absolutely straight in an area characterized by narrow meandering alleys and small piazzas. It is also wider than most streets in the centre of Rome, but still only has barely room for two lanes of traffic and two narrow sidewalks. The northern portion of the street is a pedestrian area. The length of the street is roughly 1.5 kilometres.

== Via dei Fori Imperiali ==
Via dei Fori Imperiali, seen from the Colosseum looking northwest

Via dei Fori Imperiali is a road in the centre of the city that runs in a straight line from the Piazza Venezia to the Colosseum.

The road, whose original name was "Via dell'Impero", was built during the dictatorship of Benito Mussolini. Its course takes it over parts of the Forum of Trajan, Forum of Augustus and Forum of Nerva, parts of which can be seen on both sides of the road. There has in recent years been a great deal of archeological excavation on both sides of the road, while significant Imperial Roman structures are still under it.

== Via Giulia ==
Via Giulia is a street in the historic centre of Rome, mostly in rione Regola, although its northern part belongs to rione Ponte. It was one of the first important urban planning projects in Renaissance Rome.

Via Giulia was projected by Pope Julius II but the original plan was only partially carried out. This was the first attempt since antiquity to pierce a new thoroughfare through the heart of Rome and the first European example since antiquity of urban renewal. Via Giulia runs from the Ponte Sisto to the church of San Giovanni dei Fiorentini in a straight line, rather than following the tight curve of the Tiber. It became the most fashionable street for new construction for borghesi and for the Florentine community in the sixteenth century. Today its structures provide one of Rome's elite shopping streets, noted for its antique shops.

== Via Margutta ==
Via Margutta is a small street in the centre of Rome, near to Piazza del Popolo, accessible as a small alley from Via del Babuino, in the old quarter of Campo Marzio, also known as "the foreigner's quarter", located near to the slopes of Mount Pincio. It is a place with many art galleries and fashionable restaurants, where before the Renaissance there were only modest craftsmen workshops and stables.

In the 1950s, after the film Roman Holiday it became an exclusive road, and a residence of many famous people, like film director Federico Fellini. It can be reached from the north traveling by the Via Cassia or by Flaminia until arriving to the large square Piazzale Flaminio, and then passing through the city door in the wall that leads to Piazza del Popolo square, from this point it is a walk of several meters to the left of the Flaminio Obelisk towards Via del Babuino; on the left side of this road there is an alley that leads to Via Margutta.

== Via Nazionale ==
Via Nazionale is a busy street in Rome from Piazza della Repubblica leading towards the Piazza Venezia.

Already begun as the via Pia, named in honour of Pope Pius IX who had wanted to connect Stazione Termini to the city centre, the street was completed at the end of the 19th century through the ambition of several figures of the Risorgimento to create a "new Rome" as a capital of the unified Kingdom of Italy.

== Via Sacra ==
The Via Sacra (Latin: Sacred Road) is the main street of ancient Rome, leading from the top of the Capitoline Hill, through some of the most important religious sites of the Forum (where it is the widest street), to the Colosseum.
