= Castro Pretorio (Rome Metro) =

Rome metro station

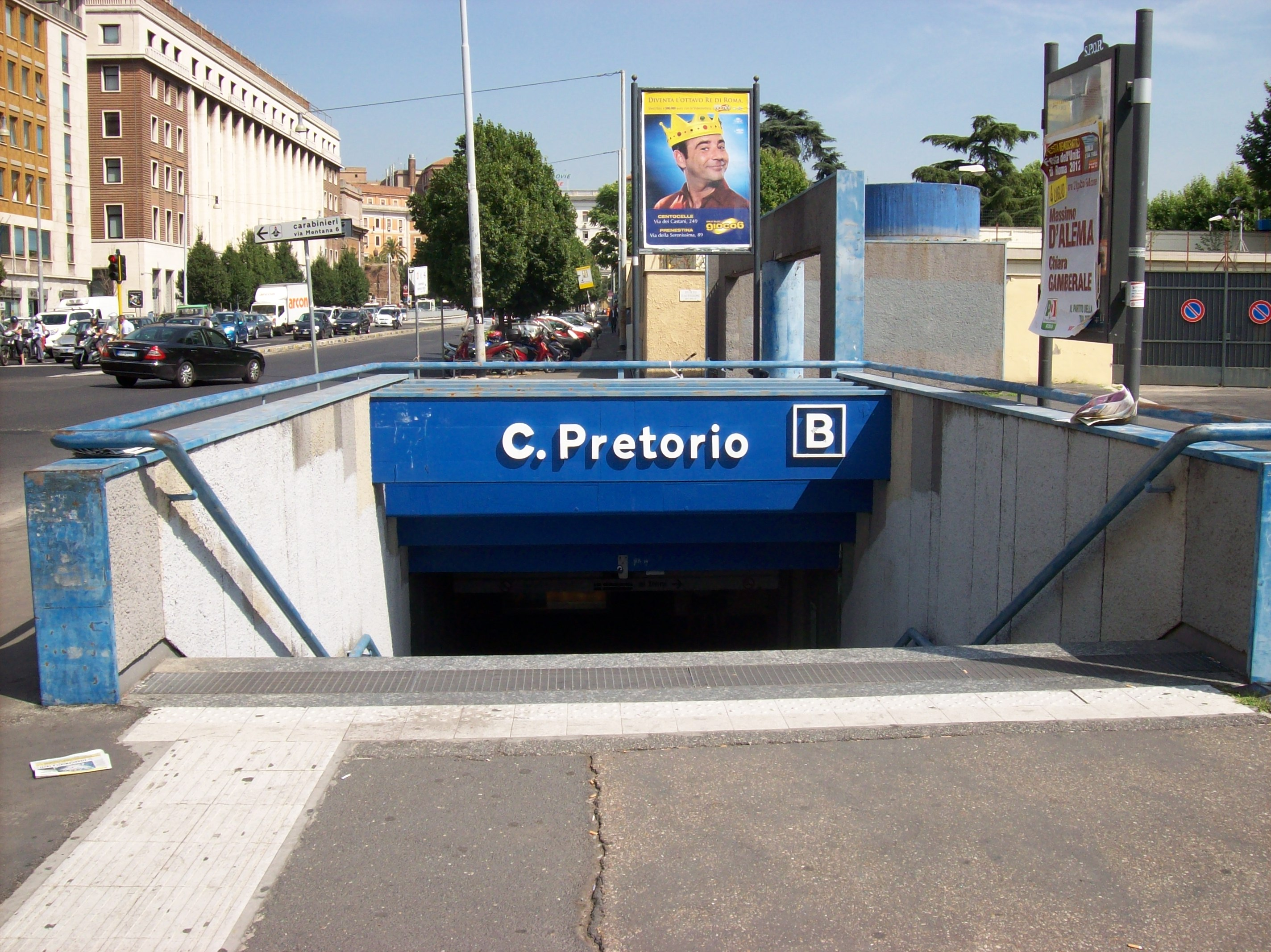

General information
- Coordinates: 41°54′22″N 12°30′20″E
- Owner: ATAC
- Platforms: 1 island platform

Construction
- Structure type: Underground

History
- Opened: 8 December 1990; 35 years ago

Services
Preceding station	Rome Metro	Following station
Termini towards Laurentina	Line B	Policlinico towards Rebibbia or Jonio
Location
- Click on the map to see marker

Castro Pretorio is a station on Line B of the Rome Metro. It was opened on 8 December 1990 and is located on Viale Castro Pretorio, at its junction with Via San Martino della Battaglia, in the Castro Pretorio rione. Its exit overlooks the Castra Praetoria (the camp of the Praetorian Guard), now the site of the Biblioteca Nazionale Centrale.

== Surroundings ==
- Biblioteca Nazionale Centrale di Roma
  (Rome National central Library)
- Castra praetoria
- Porta Pia
- Porta Nomentana
  - Arch of Sixtus V
- Piazza dell'Indipendenza
- Piazza della Croce Rossa
  - Ministry of Transport (main HQ)
  - Ferrovie dello Stato Group (main HQ)
- quartiere San Lorenzo
- Città Universitaria
