= Policlinico Umberto I =

General hospital in Rome, part of the Sapienza Università di Roma

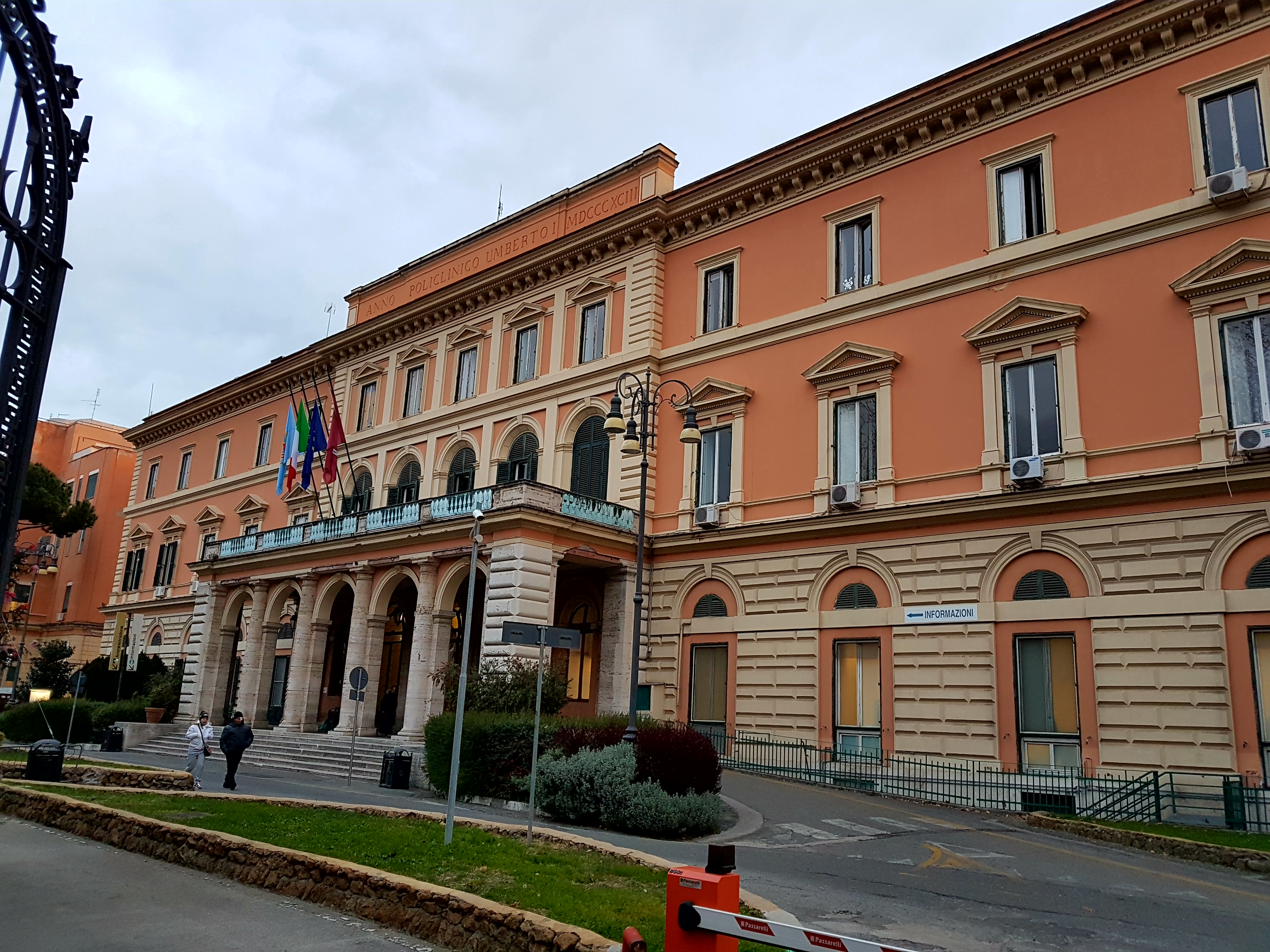

Geography
- Location: Viale del Policlinico, 155, Rome, Lazio, Italy
- Coordinates: 41°54′25″N 12°30′40″E

Organisation
- Type: General
- Affiliated university: Sapienza University of Rome

Services
- Emergency department: Yes
- Beds: 1,235

History
- Founded: 1903

Links
- Website: policlinicoumberto1.it
- Lists: Hospitals in Italy

Located in the Nomentano quarter, the Policlinico Umberto I of Rome is the polyclinic of the Faculty of Medicine and Surgery of the Sapienza University of Rome.

It is the largest hospital in Europe in terms of occupied area and the third hospital in Italy in terms of number of beds (after the Policlinico Sant'Orsola-Malpighi of Bologna and the Agostino Gemelli University Policlinic), the second Italian hospital if public hospitals are considered. Its construction was mainly promoted by Italian physicians and politicians Guido Baccelli and Francesco Durante and began in 1883 to plans by Giulio Podesti and Filippo Laccetti, and was completed 20 years later, with the opening presided over by the then rector Luigi Galassi and by Umberto I of Italy, after whom it is named. It is served by the Policlinico Metro station.
