= Guido Baccelli =

Italian politician (1830–1916)

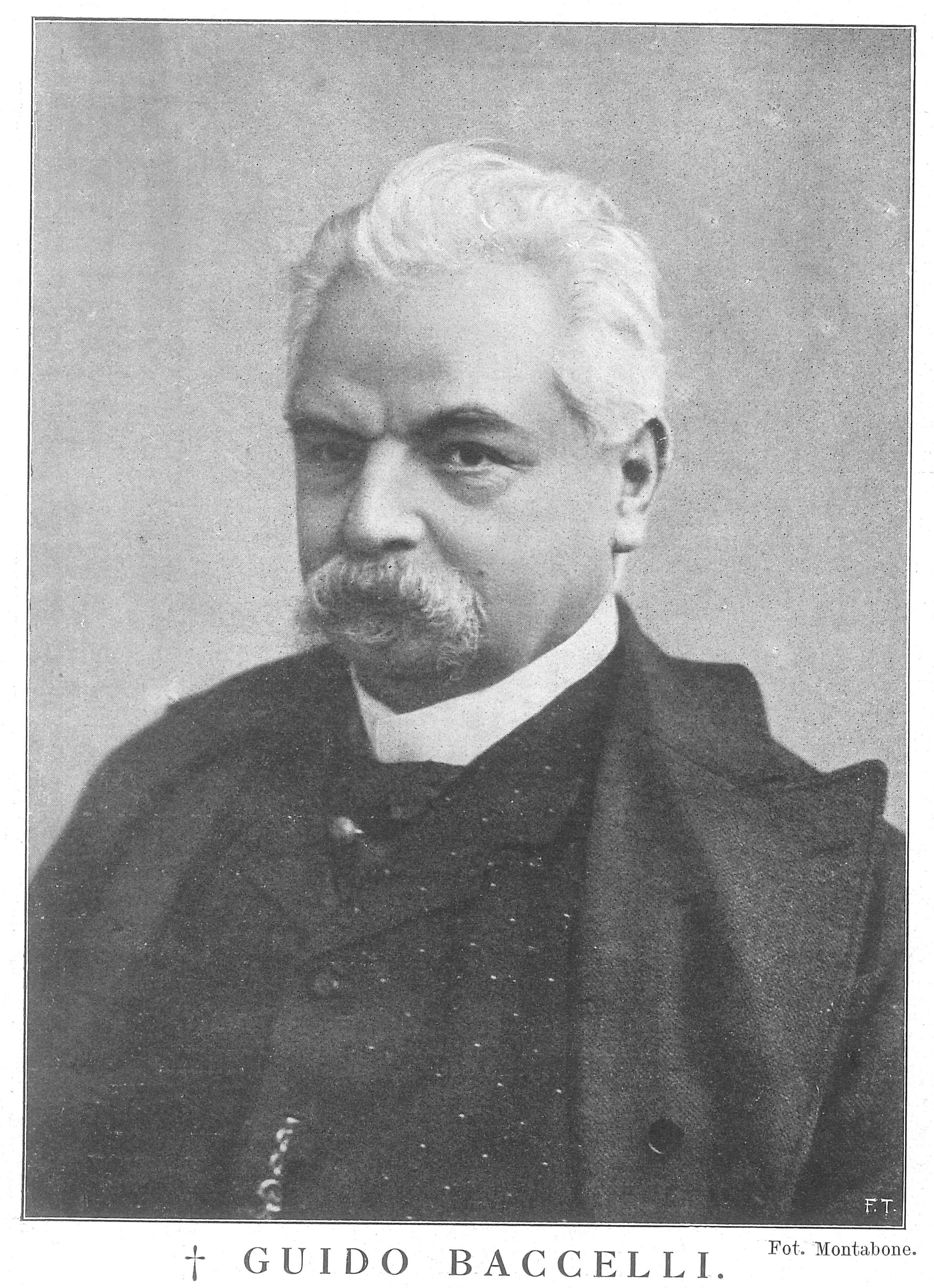
- Born: 25 November 1830; Rome, Papal States (now Italy)
- Died: 10 January 1916 (aged 85); Rome, Italy
- Scientific career
- Fields: Medicine, politics
- Workplaces: Sapienza University of Rome

Guido Baccelli (25 November 1830 – 10 January 1916) was an Italian physician and statesman. One of the most renowned Italian physicians of the late 19th century, he was Minister of Education of the then young Kingdom of Italy for six times and once Minister of Agriculture, Industry and Commerce, for a total period of almost ten years, between 1881 and 1903. He was a teacher to Augusto Murri. Together with Italian surgeon Francesco Durante, Baccelli promoted the construction of the Policlinico Umberto I in Rome.

The fundamental feature of his teaching was anatomopathological and clinical at one time;he alternated lessons on the sick with lessons on the corpse, so that students could have an exact view of the progress of diseases, and at the same time the anatomical damage they induce.

His concept of clinical anatomism ("The modern clinic" he used to repeat "is a school of living anatomy") always found practical application to the patient's bed, in the approach given by his school to the study of diseases and was largely comforted by the brilliant results achieved in semeiotics and therapy.

Of the clinical work of the Baccelli are first to remember the flattering successes obtained by the bold endovenous introduction of quinine salts in the treatment of malaria, and that of corrosive sublimated (Bichloride of mercury) in the treatment of rebellious syphilis.

== Baccelli as a physician ==
Following the footsteps of his father Antonio Baccelli, who was a physician of note, Guido Baccelli started his academic path by studying medicine in Rome, his native city. After graduating in 1852, Baccelli practiced as a physician for hospitals, in particular the "Santo Spirito in Saxia" in Rome; as well as professor in numerous subfields of medicine.

Guido Baccelli spent almost his entire clinical and teaching life in the ancient, glorious but by that time decaying and unfit, mediaeval hospital of Santo Spirito in Saxia in Rome, between the Tiber and the Vatican City. He was one of the Italian pioneers in the use of the stethoscope - the common people often referred to him as "the physician who examines the sick with the trumpet" – of intravenous therapy and oxygen therapy. In particular, he became famous when administered oxygen to the Italian King Victor Emmanuel II, prolonging his life for a few days during his last illness (a severe pneumonia).

He gave relevant contributions to the struggle against malaria which, at that time, was one of the main health and social problems of the recently reunited Kingdom of Italy and of its Capital town. In 1878 – with the occasion of the Universal Exposition of Paris – he wrote an important state-of-the-art essay on this subject: La Malaria di Roma. Guido Baccelli successively welcomed in his clinic of Santo Spirito the two future Nobel Prizes Alphonse Laveran (in 1882) and Camillo Golgi (in 1893) who were looking for confirmations of their theories about the origin and evolution of malaria, in the Campagna Romana, then scourged by the disease during summer and autumn time. Baccelli was quite slow in accepting the anopheles as the sole vector in the transmission of the illness, nevertheless he was a strong medical and political supporter of the Laws for the drainage of the Campagna Romana and the Pontine Marshes that - along with the free administration of quinine - significantly reduced the incidence of the disease in those areas. Moreover, in 1889 he devised an effective treatment of the most serious cases of malaria with intravenous injections of quinine.

=== Innovation ===
Guido Baccelli was a promoter of intravenous or endovenous injections as a technique for malignant diseases.

During a medical congress in Rome in 1894, Bacelli defined himself as the originator of the idea of injecting medication into the veins for the specific treatment of malaria and syphilis via a neutral solution (10%) of quinine hydrochlorate. Baccelli developed experience on this technique through animal testing. Following extensive experimentation, Baccelli described the intravenous injections as "harmless" and "rapid", and therefore applied this technique to his patients. As a consequence, endovenous injection gained high popularity amongst the Italian population during his practice. In addition to the use of intravenous therapy, Baccelli's spirit of innovation was reflected by his teaching style, which consisted in encouraging his pupils to adopt modern scientific methods, and by his extensive use of the stethoscope as a diagnostic tool.

=== Research ===
Baccelli was an active researcher with a particular focus on malaria, a disease that was significantly affecting Rome and the Roman countryside (the "Campagna Romana") at the end of the 19th century. Baccelli hosted in his research centre Alphonse Laveran (in 1882) and Camillo Golgi (in 1893), two leading scientists who were also interested in researching malaria.

Another important area of research for Baccelli was the abdominal and thoracic symptomatology. Baccelli performed important works on the pathology of the heart and aorta.

The investigation of a wide variety of symptoms and morbid features led Baccelli to the discovery of the aphonic pectoriloquy, a phenomenon consisting in the modification of the voice heard on auscultation. Today the aphonic pectoriloquy is still known as "Baccelli's sign".

The papers published by Baccelli include:

- Monograph on Roman malaria including views on sanitary improvement of Campagna (1878)
- Treatise in four volumes on the pathology of the heart and aorta (1863 to 1878)
- Clinical lectures on Malaria (1869)
- Sub continuous fevers (1876)
- True Empyema (1868)
- Primary cancer of the spleen (1876)
- A new method of treatment for aneurysm of the aorta (1876)
- A new symptom of ovarian tumours in general and of ovarian cysts in particular (1876)
- The transmission of sounds through endopleuritic effusions (1875 & 1877)
- State medicine and clinical medicine in ancient and modern Rome (1879)
- Paradoxal compensation of cardiac lesions (1894)

=== Academic teaching ===
Baccelli conducted teaching activities throughout his entire career.

In 1856 the pontifical government assigned Baccelli the teaching of Forensic Medicine at the Pontifical University of "La Sapienza", a role that he carried out for two years. Subsequently, in 1862, Baccelli devoted himself to the field of morbid anatomy and started teaching Clinical Medicine, a subject that he delivered until the end of his career. In addition, Baccelli lectured on many other subjects including botany and pathology.

== Career as a politician ==
In parallel to his career as a physician, Guido Baccelli was also an active politician who devoted significant time and effort to improving his home city, Rome, in numerous fields, ranging from agriculture to education.

The leading roles obtained by Baccelli as a politician include: Deputy for Rome at the Italian parliament in 1875, Minister of Public Instruction in 1881 during Cairoli's 3rd Cabinet, during Depretis' 4th and 5th cabinet from 1881 to 1884, during Crespi's 3rd 4th Cabinet from 1893 to 1896 and during Pelloux's first and second cabinet from 1898 to 1900, Minister of Agriculture, Industry and Commerce during Zanardelli's first government from 1901 to 1903 and "President of the National Board of Health" (Consiglio Superiore di Sanità) from 1872 to 1877 and again from 1887 to 1915.

As part of his role as Minister of Public Instruction, Baccelli promoted reforms in the fields of primary and university education.

Baccelli's ideas were revolutionary for the time. In a time period where the central government opposed giving too much knowledge to the populace, he strove to reduce the rate of illiteracy with a peculiar type of schooling known at the time as "Complementary". It would instruct young adults between the ages of 16 and 19 by reviewing what had been studied in elementary school and adding military topics (1898).

Baccelli also proposed a law on the work of women and children (Sul lavoro delle donne e dei fanciulli) which was approved in June 1902, this law substituted the obsolete law of February 1886 n 3657.

=== The Foundation of Policlinico Umberto I ===
Baccelli wanted to create a modern hospital in Rome one that would encompass all the different clinics of the ancient Roman hospitals. Baccelli himself laid out the plan of this project the first stone was placed on 19 January 1888 in the presence of the King Umberto Primo. The construction started in September 1889 and lasted 12 years and was completed by 1902. The hospital was officially inaugurated in 1903. It was structured in 6 pavilions each of them was structured in 2-3 floors. The hospital could hold up to 1200 ill the area it occupied was 160000 metres squared. It was fairly isolated compared to the rest of the city this is because it was built in a place thought to be one of the most salubrious of the whole city.

=== Cultural and environmental contributions ===
Baccelli's contribution to the cultural richness of Rome are not to be underestimated, most noteworthy are the opening of the galleria dell'arte moderna (Modern art gallery), the creation of the Archaeological stroll (Passeggiata archeologica) in the Imperial forum. The area at the time was threatened by a number of buildings Baccelli saw the historical and archaeological value of this site and proposed a number of laws that prohibited the construction of buildings in the area, like the law proposed on 13 November and ratified on 7 December 1898 which extended the no-build area even further. To convince his colleagues on the usefulness of this protected area he brought their attention to the fact that the area was insalubrious and unhealthy. Quote: "Convince yourselves gentlemen that your first priority for your house in the capital is to make this evermore salubrious; add to this that one of the most degraded areas and closest to buildings is surrounded by the palatino on one side and the colosseum at the end of it and on its right the baths of Caracalla; and so from the grandiose of the ancient monuments becomes a proud sarcasm the present insalubrity. This area that lies in the heart of the city is one of the most plagued by Malaria, there are undisciplined waters, there the canes grow, there the declivity of the ground is great, there is everything that you can humanly fear as a reason of great unhealthiness. So wouldn't you think, before the bridges, before the buildings, before the policlinico itself, of the salubrity of this city you will have to live in?". And the revival of ancient monuments which had been modified like the pantheon to this Pope Urbano 7th Barberini commissioned Bernini to add 2 bell towers which became popularly known as "The donkey's ears" these were removed by Baccelli in 1883 and some bronze letters were added to the facade in memory of Agrippa's work.

Baccelli also strived to protect the environment as we see in April 1887 when a forestry law (Legge forestale) was being discussed. This would have granted more liberty to the proprietors of those woods to exploit them, Baccelli strongly opposed this law and to support his thesis he brought forward epidemiological data and in doing so provided a connection between deforestation and illness.

He also introduced for the first time in Italy in 1899 the Arbor day (festa degli alberi) the first celebration of this day in Rome (21 November 1899) was a huge success with over 5000 students participating, and the planting of over 400 trees.

== Main writings ==
- Ascoltazione e percussione nella Scuola romana, Dalla Tipografia Forense, Roma 1857, pp. 10
- Patologia del cuore e dell'aorta, Dallo Stabilimento Tipografico, Roma 1863–1866, 3 voll.
- La Malaria di Roma, estratto dalla Monografia della Città di Roma e della Campagna Romana, Tipografia Elzeviriana, Roma 1878, pp. 51
- La via delle vene aperta ai medicamenti eroici, Tip. Nazionale Ditta G. Bertero e C., Roma 1907, pp. 66

== Bibliography ==
- Anonymous, Guido Baccelli, M.D., BMJ 1916;1:114.2
- Alfredo Baccelli, Guido Baccelli. Ricordi, Edizioni "La Riforma Medica", Napoli 1931, pp. 114
- Fausto Pettinelli, Il Medico dei Re, CLD, Pontedera 2000, pp. 102
- Giovanni Antonazzi, Le <<orecchie d'asino>> sul Pantheon, in fogli sparsi raccolti per il sabato sera, Roma, edizioni di storia e letteratura (1997)
- Giovanni Gorrini, Guido Baccelli. La vita, l'opera, il pensiero, Lattes, Torino 1916, pp. 318
- Irene Quaresima, Guido Baccelli. Sintesi di una vita, Prospettive Edizioni, Roma 2002
- Luca Borghi, Guido Baccelli, in JOURNAL OF MEDICAL BIOGRAPHY (2012) 20 (2), p. 70
- Luca Borghi, Guido Baccelli, proto-ambientalista? La tutela della natura come strumento educativo e sanitario a cavallo tra Ottocento e Novecento. I labirinti della medicina atti del 50° congresso nazonale della società italiana di storia della medicina (2015)
- Luca Borghi, Rome's physician: Guido Baccelli and his legacy in the new Italian Capital, in MEDICINA NEI SECOLI. ARTE E SCIENZA, (2013) 25/2, pp. 395-414
- Luca Borghi, Il medico di Roma. Vita, morte e miracoli di Guido Baccelli (1830-1916), Armando Editore, Roma 2015, pp, 456
- Mario Crespi, Guido Baccelli, in Dizionario Biografico degli Italiani, Vol. 5 (1963)
- Paolo De Vecchi Baccelli's method of endovenous injections of corrosive sublimate. Ruggiero (1985)
- Polifilo (Beltrami, Luca) Roma finis saeculi, Bocca. (1899) [Translated from Italian]
- Richard Hogner, Intravenous, Medical Injections According to Prof. Guido Baccelli's Method. The Boston Medical and Surgical Journal. 132(26) (1895)
- Valerio Strinati, "Origini e Istituzione della Cassa di maternità (1875-1910)" Studi Storici. 45(2) (2004)
