= Augusto Murri =

Italian physician

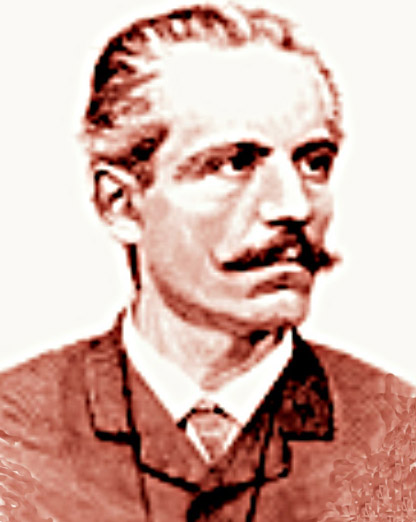
- Dr Augusto Murri
- Born: 1841; Fermo
- Died: 1932 (aged 90–91); Bologna
- Occupation: Clinician - Illustrious Professor at the Bologna University - Author of Treatises
- Children: Linda (Teodolinda) Bonmartini, Tullio

Augusto Murri (8 September 1841, Fermo - 11 November 1932, Bologna) was an Italian physician. Appointed to the Chair of Clinical Medicine at the University of Bologna in 1875, he was regarded as one of the most illustrious clinical doctors and innovators of his times (in Pathological Anatomy, Histology, Microbiology and Experimental Physiopathology).

== Biography ==
Augusto Murri was born in Fermo on 8 September 1841. Son of Giovambattista Murri, a magistrate, deputy of the Repubblica Romana, and Teodolinda Polimanti, the mother. At 15 years old, Murri was illiterate as his father was against the education provided by the school of Fermo, as run by Jesuits. Meanwhile, his father was exiled firstly at Corfu then in Genova for political motives. Scolopius father provided for Murri’s education in San Giovannino, near Florence, allowing him to earn a basic educational license in few years.

In the university of Florence he attended the lessons of Carlo Ghinozzi, professor of medical clinics, and then studied physiology with Cesare Studiati, and finally graduated in medical clinics in 1864.

Post-degree, Murri travelled to Germany and Paris and then returned in Italy for some charges.

In 1869 he got married with Giannina Murri (same surname but they were not relatives), daughter of a storekeeper. In 1871 his first child Teodolinda, called Linda, was born, and two years later they had a second child, Tullio.

In 1870 he went to Rome called by Guido Baccelli, who assigned to Murri a chair of medical clinics as assistant. Guido Baccelli remained impressed with Murri’s studies on "The nature of the morbose process of the severe jaundice" published in 1868 on the Florentine magazine Lo sperimentale. Here, Murri confuted Friedrich Theodor von Frerichs' theories relating the disease to a deep change in the properties of the blood fluid, whereas the prevalent opinion was that the illness was originated by a mechanic cause. Murri anticipated the rationalistic method becoming his and of his school distinctive characteristic.

There were differences also between the Italian and the German medicine. The Italian one, represented by Guido Baccelli, Antonio Cardarelli and Augusto Murri, was against the German idea of a diagnosis predominantly focused on laboratory; rather they supported the idea of how much the careful and direct observation of the sick and the necessity of the clinical reasoning are important.

In 1874 he took part, without success, at the contest for the chair of medical clinics of Turin. Two years later, in 1876, Ruggero Bonghi, Minister of the public education, made Murri the director of the medical clinic of the University of Bologna.

Murri’s presence in the university had become a reason for pride, and he became also chancellor for a year (1888 to 1889). His lessons were considered captivating and engaging, comparing him to Giosuè Carducci. He died on 11 November 1932 in Bologna, and his corpse was then brought to Fermo.

== Career ==
Augusto Murri studied in Florence and in Pisa, and then he graduated in Medicine in Camerino, in 1864. After getting his degree, he moved to Paris, where he followed the lectures of Ernest Bazin, Louis Fournier and Armand Trousseau. Other than Paris, he also studied in Berlin and Vienna. Later on he won a scholarship and had the opportunity to go study in Germany, following Ludwig Traube. He also worked as a medical doctor in Fabriano and Civitavecchia. After his first publications, in 1870 he went to Rome, where he was an assistant to Guido Baccelli, who at the time was a professor.

From 1876 to 1916 he was approved as the head of the medical clinic at Bologna University. He moved it from the Azzolini hospital (which was in decay) to the S. Orsola hospital. During those years, he set up a radiological cabinet, an endoscopy cabinet and a chemistry and physics laboratory. During the years he spent in Bologna, he also became the dean of the Alma Mater Studiorum, precisely from 5 October 1888 until the year 1889. Since he wanted to relaunch the university and make it better and better, he formed a Consortium with the province of Bologna and with the town.

He was a member of the Italian Chamber of deputies from 1890 to 1892. He also became a candidate for the Italian Parliament, and he promoted various campaigns against pellagra, tuberculosis, and diphtheria.

In 1905, he went back, at the continuous request of the students, to teaching after having removed himself because of the events regarding the death of his son-in-law (the Murri case, see below).

== Teaching and medical contribution ==
One of the things that distinguished him from the rest of the professors of the time was his teaching method. As a matter of fact, he used a strict didactic method according to which students were taught to include the scientific method, used for years in the natural phenomena scope, also for medical practice. By insisting on the use of this rationalist method, he became the main reason why nowadays clinicians use the clinical method. This consists of a correct diagnosis thanks to the use of scientific observation, and then finding the best therapy possible. This method was actually an inductive method: the physician examined the patient without any preconception about their state, and then gathered all the possible information thanks to a complete anamnesis (that also involved their family) and thanks to a thorough analysis of every organ and system. Then, instead of this method, which proved to be too time-consuming, he started using the hypothetical-inductive method, by which the physician first formulated a hypothesis, and then checked the patient to see whether the hypothesis was correct and accurate.

One of his many innovations was also introducing the use of physiopathology terms to diagnose disease.

He mainly focused on education and healthcare.

In his work "Sulla natura del processo morboso dell’itterizia grave", he linked jaundice to some changes in the properties of blood. In his other work, "Lezioni di clinica medica", he highlighted that a meticulous observation and analysis of phenomena was necessary in order to have a correct diagnosis and adequate therapy. In his last work, "Nosologia e psicologia", he stated that there aren't any differences between psychopathologies and pathologies of organs. In particular, he focused on hysteria, criticizing Sigmund Freud's theories about the cause of hysteria being the suppression of puerile sexual desire.

Moreover, he also studied:

- Quinine arsenate, because it was highly present in malarial fevers
- The regulatory power of animal temperature (in 1873)
- Cerebral and cerebellar injuries, hemoglobinuria and glandular failure
- Addison’s disease
- Cardiological pathologies
- The mechanism of physiopathological equilibrium (Murri’s law), which allows the continuation of various vital functions
- Cheyne-Stokes respiration

== Mindset ==
Three fundamental principles are at the base of Murri’s ideas. The first principle is observing. A clinician should observe carefully and describe the events without suddenly turning them out with his assumptions. Murri’s method, indeed, was made up by the listening, the physical exam, the vision of the assessments, the experimental verification and the attention to facts. This is part of the process of anamnesis. According to Murri, facts are dumb, and this allows people to interpret them as they want but the truth hidden in facts can be discovered only if the human reason is used. This is the reason why the second fundamental principle for Murri is reasoning. Reasoning includes gathering information and interpreting them. However, a clinician needs to develop, on the base of his empirical observations, reasonable assumptions. More reasonable hypotheses are expressed, higher is the probability to find the right assumption. It is not possible to make a good diagnosis if the doctor is not able to imagine and develop different hypotheses. A good doctor has the ability to imagine a huge number of assumptions to make a good final diagnosis. The third and final principle, according to Murri, is criticizing everything and everyone before believing firmly in any assumption. Any affirmation must be tested through scientific evidence. Criticizing anything must be a rule to follow for any assumption or hypothesis; clinicians can have only one preconception: everything that is affirmed or that seems true can be false. A clinician must therefore always have scientific proof.

Murri is particularly concentrated on the observation and analysis of the events in order to reach the right diagnosis and also an appropriate therapy.

== The Murri case ==
Bologna in the beginning of the 20th century was the scene of a crime considered as the first big "show trial". In the morning of 2 September 1902, in Mazzini 39 street the dead body of Francesco Bonmartini was found. He was the husband of Linda, daughter of Augusto Murri. The murderer was presumed to be Tullio, instigated by the sister Linda who suffered greatly by her husband mistreatments; it was exactly Augusto Murri that reported his son. Augusto Murri was enormously marked by this event and by the consecutive sentence of both his children. The case was also taken as a pretext by the Catholic daily newspaper "L' Avvenire" for a campaign against the laical rationalism, the socialism and the Masonry. The trial was then transferred from Bologna to Turin, and ended with the sentence of guilty of both Linda and Tullio. However, Linda was out of prison after a few months for the gracefulness of the king, while Tullio remained in prison until 1919.

100 years later, the daughter of Tullio and granddaughter of Augusto Murri, Gianna Murri, came up with a new truth of the case of Murri, sustaining that his father was innocent. She said in her book, where she reconstructed the Murri crime, that it was the lover of Linda called the "Biondino" that killed Bonmartini in reality, and that her father was only in the right place at the wrong time, called by the "Biondino", making him appear as the murderer. Gianna Murri said that her father, after going out of prison, wrote a memoir where he told the truth about the murder and the "Biondino", and the latter confessed all to a priest before dying. The reason why Tullio was blamed for the murder was for his father, in order not to make him suffer about the adultery of the sister Linda.

These written proofs made by Tullio never came out, but all is clarified by Gianna Murri in her book "The truth about my family and the Murri crime".

== His works ==
- "Sulla natura del processo morboso dell’itterizia grave" ("The nature of the morbose process of the severe jaundice")
- "Nosologia e psicologia" ("Nosology and psychology")
- "Lezioni di clinica medica" ("Lectures on medical clinic")

== Bibliography ==
- Danieli, Giovanni. "Ascoltare, osservare, intuire, ragionare... Rileggendo Augusto Murri." Lettere dalla Facoltà, 4 Dec. 2018, letteredallafacolta.univpm.it/ascoltare-osservare-intuire-ragionare
- Furnari, Rosario Luca. "Augusto Murri." Torino Scienza, www.torinoscienza.it/personaggi/augusto-murri. Accessed 17 Apr. 2021
- Gissi, Alessandra. "MURRI, Augusto." Treccani, 2012, www.treccani.it/enciclopedia/augusto-murri_(Dizionario-Biografico)
- Martinelli, Giovanni. "Augusto Murri." Corriere Proposte, 17 June 2011, www.corriereproposte.it/cosa-sapere/augusto-murri.html
- "Murri Augusto." Storia e Memoria di Bologna, www.storiaememoriadibologna.it/murri-augusto-519918-persona. Accessed 20 Apr. 2021.
- Pellerano, Fernando. "L' ultima verità sul caso Murri." la Repubblica, 11 Mar. 2003, ricerca.repubblica.it/repubblica/archivio/repubblica/2003/03/11/ultima-verita-sul-caso-murri.html
