= Piazza dei Cinquecento =

Public square in Rome, Italy

- City square
- {{{other_names}}}
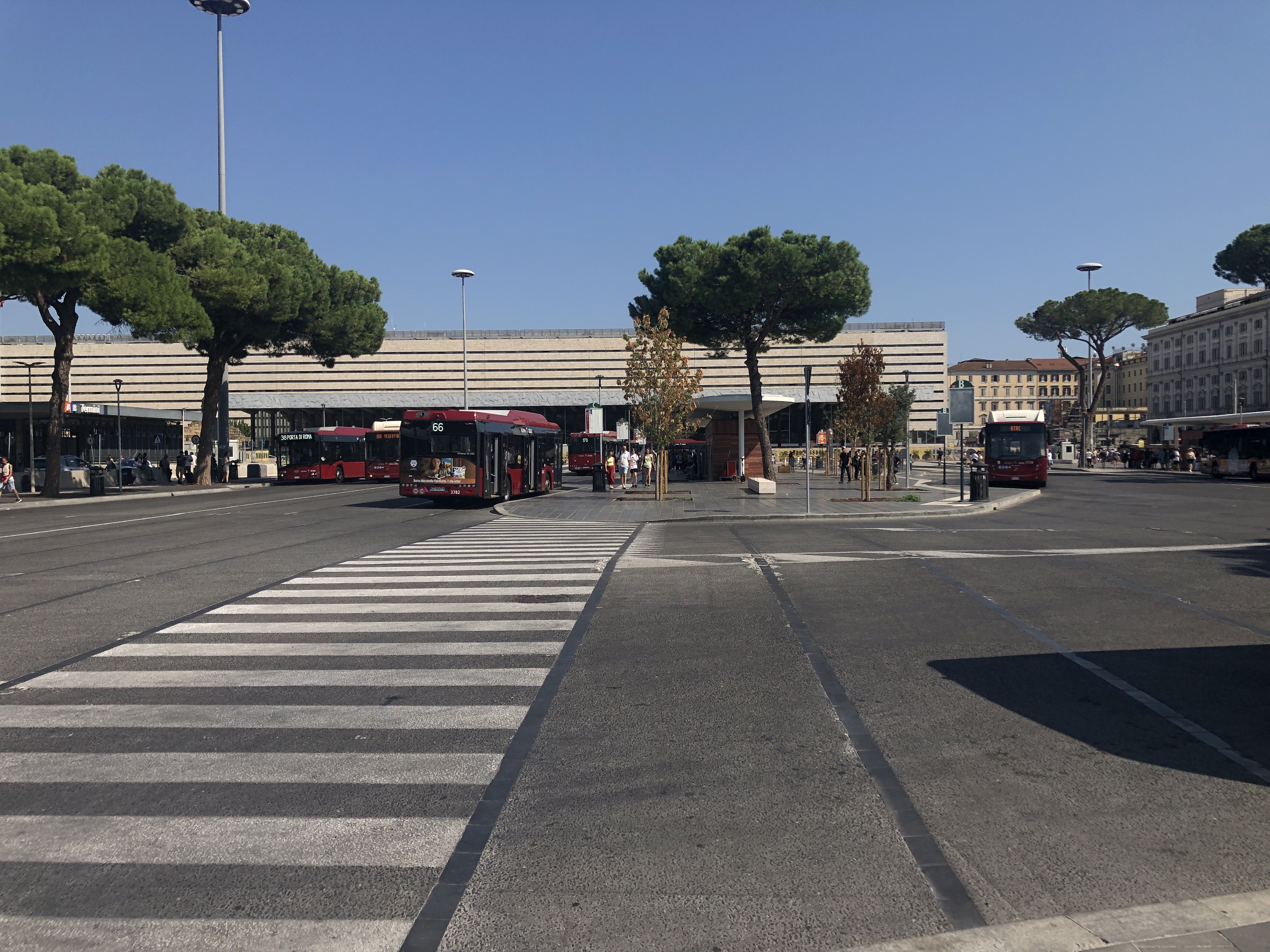
- Constructed: 19th century
- Surface: 45000 square metres
- Dedicated to: To the circa 500 Italian soldiers killed in the Battle of Dogali (1887)
- Location: Rome, Italy
- Interactive map of Piazza dei Cinquecento

Piazza dei Cinquecento is a square in Rome. It is in front of the Roma Termini railway station and it contains the terminus of many bus lines, two tram lines and the intersection of two different metro lines, making it the major hub of public transit in Rome.

== History ==
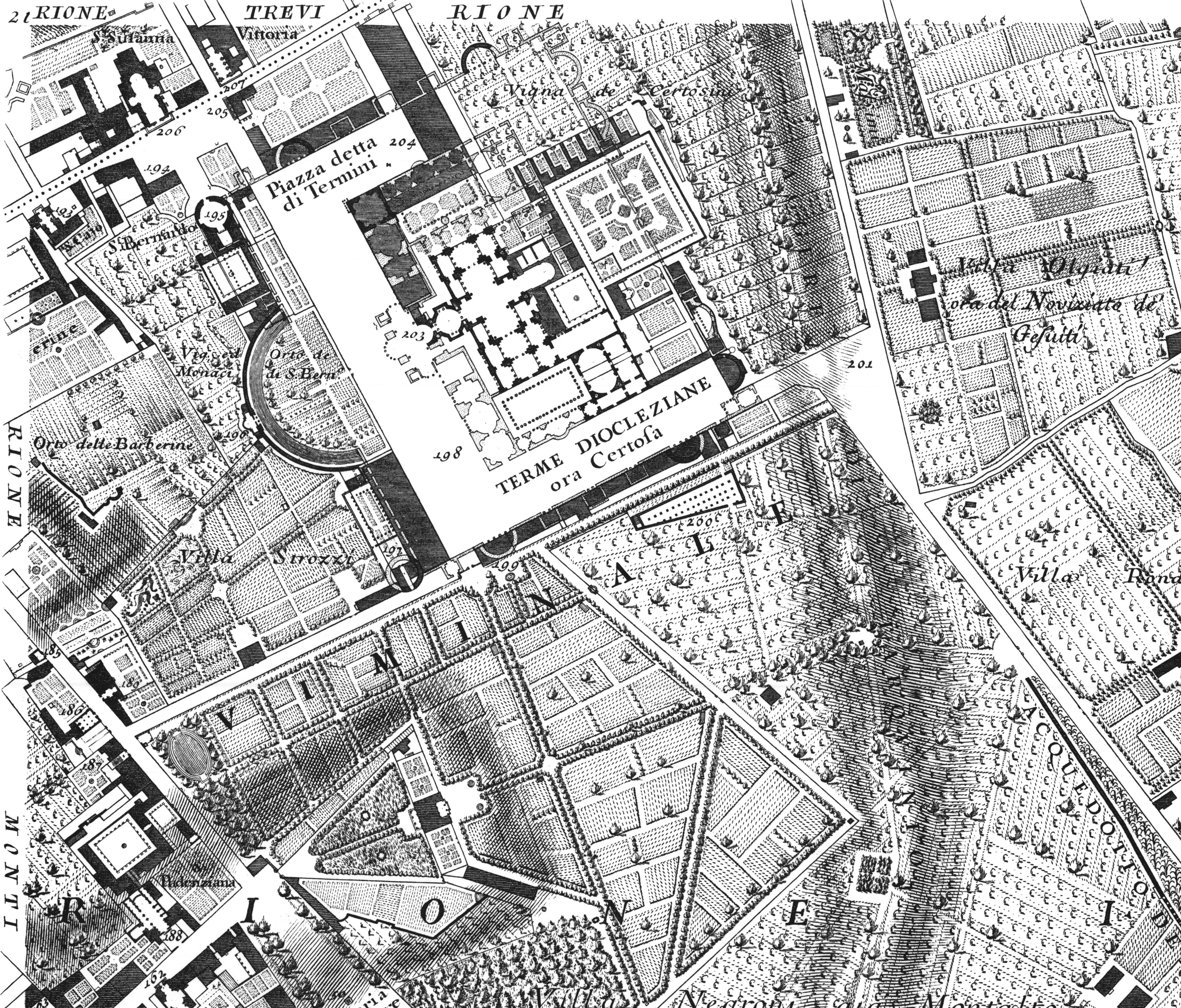
The elevation of the agger still visible in this 18th century map of the area.

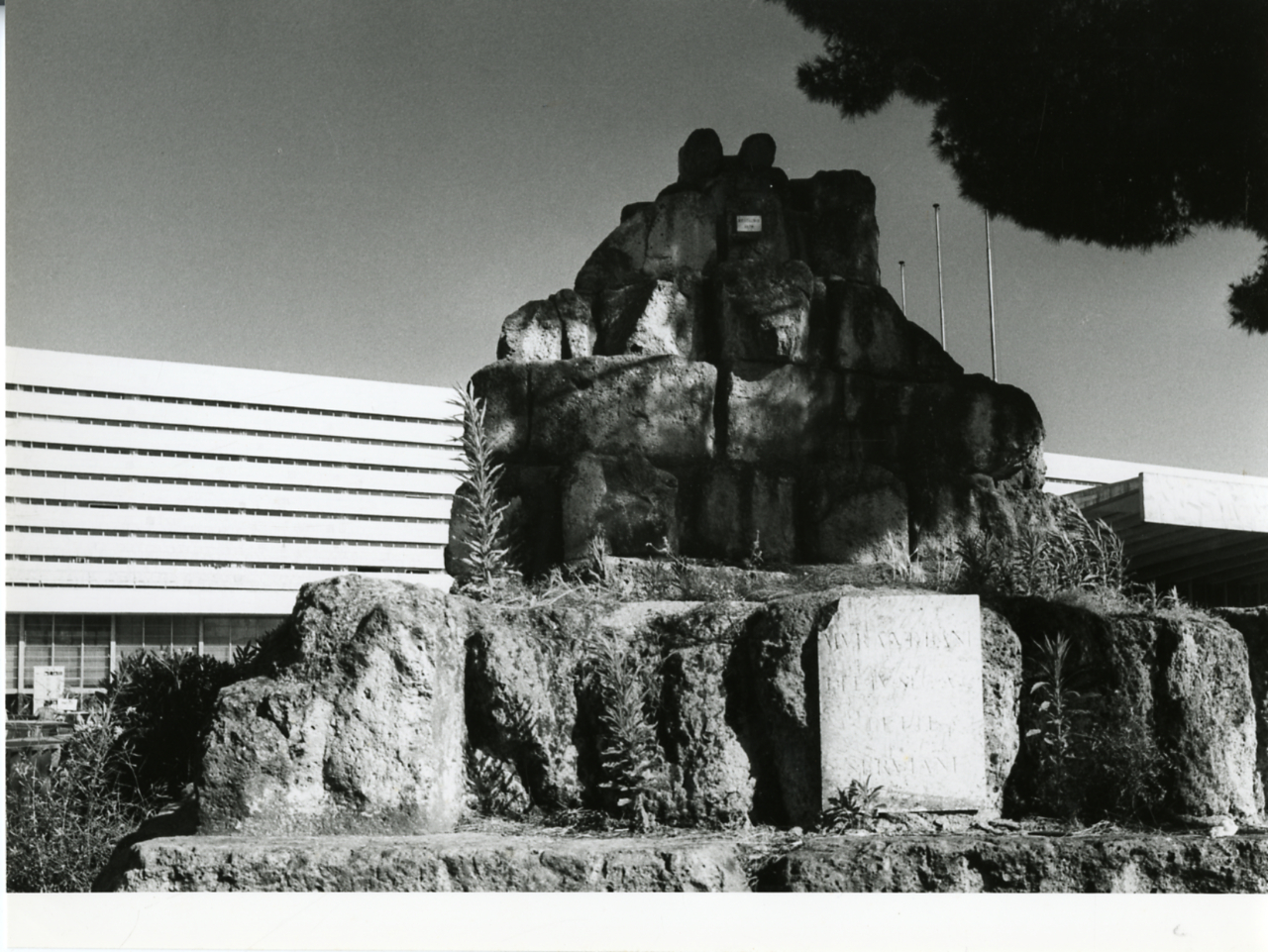
Remains of the Servian Walls near the Roma Termini train station (Author: Paolo Monti).

In Ancient Rome, an agger was built on the area, serving as a military structure supporting the Servian Walls (a small part of which can still be seen in the square). In the 16th century, a statue of the goddess Roma was placed at the top of the agger itself. The Baths of Diocletian ("Terme di Diocleziano") were built at the limit of the nowadays square.

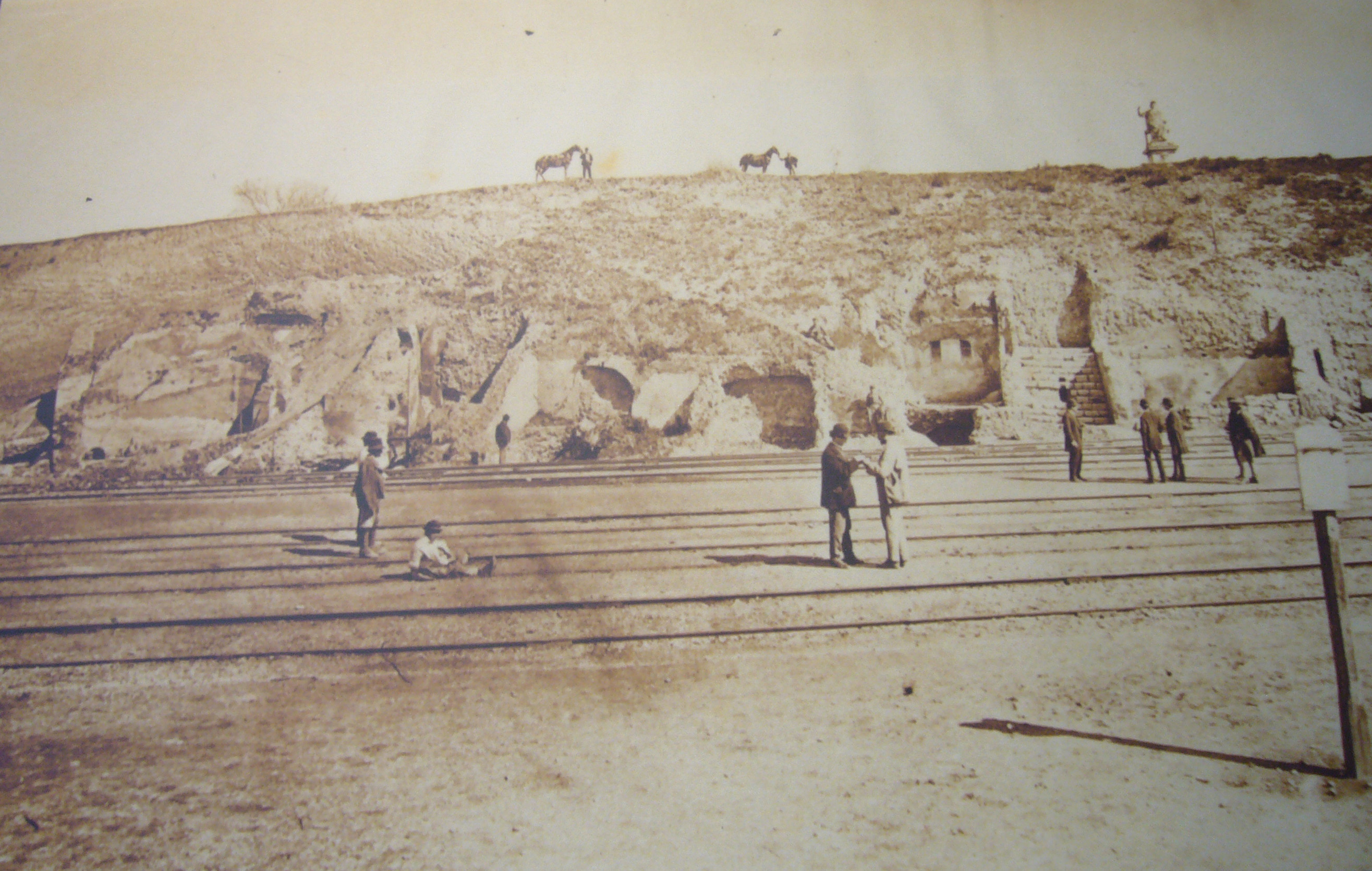
The agger partially removed in 1862, with the statue of the deity Roma still on the top.

In the 1860s, the agger was removed in order to build the first train station of the capital.

In 1916, the square was renamed Piazza dei Cinquecento ("Square of the Five Hundred"), owing the name to the circa 500 Italian soldiers that died in the 1887 Battle of Dogali.

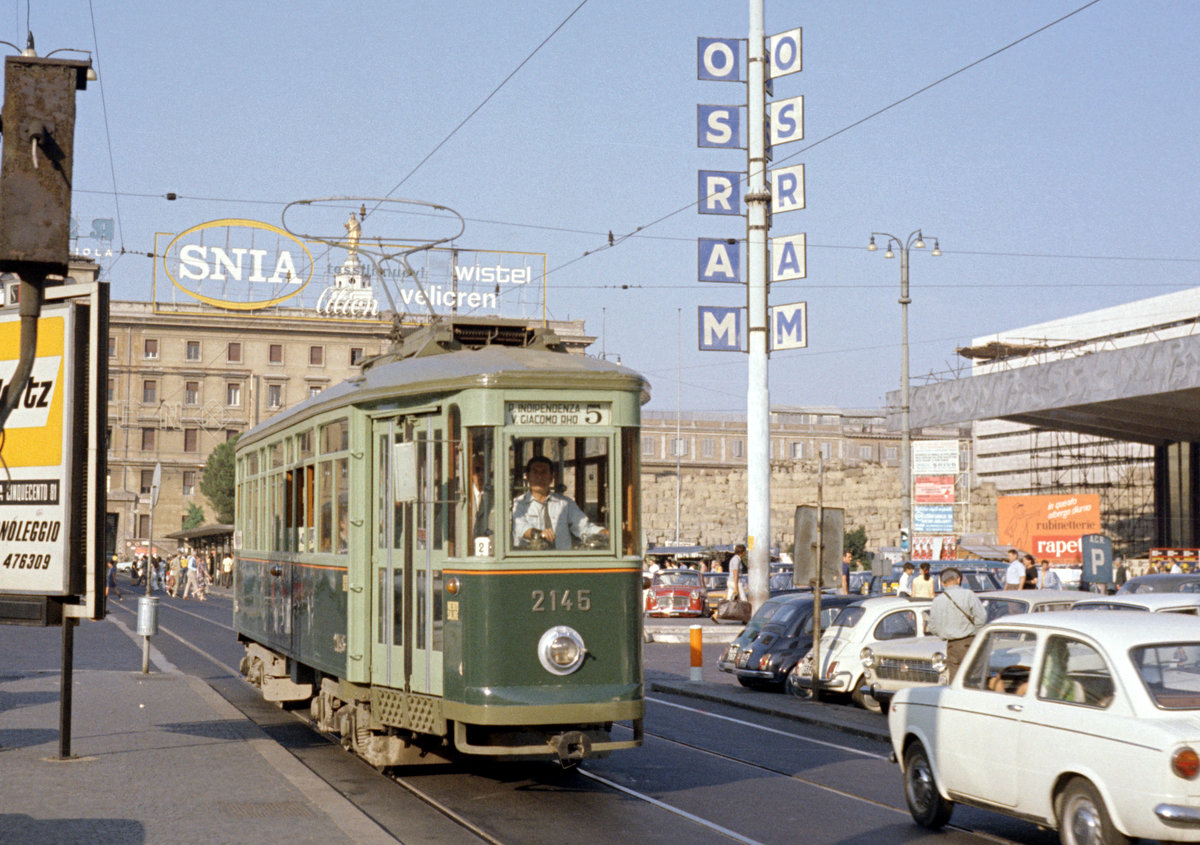
Piazza dei Cinquecento in 1970 with the OSRAM light pole visible.

In 1960, an OSRAM light pole was placed at the center of the square, rapidly becoming a reference point. The light pole itself was removed in the 1980s.

=== The XXI century ===
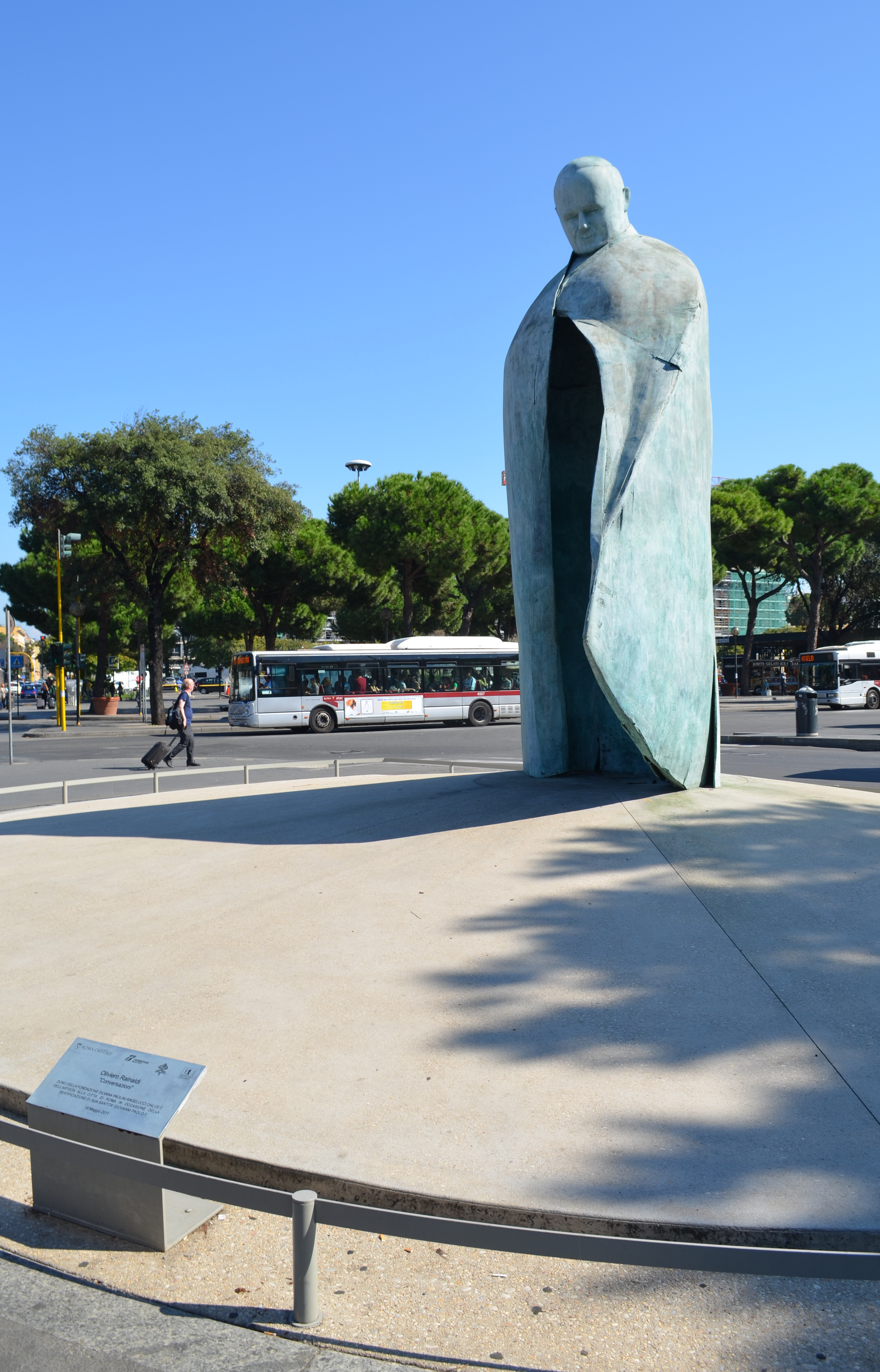
The statue of Pope John Paul II, first inaugurated in 2011 and then rebuilt in 2012. After the 2025 renewal of the square it will still stay in the same place.

In 2011, a statue of Pope John Paul II was placed in the square.

The square is going through a complete renewal in 2025–2026, the occasion of the 2025 Jubilee, with more space for walking and optimized bus stops: on 14 January 2025 the new part of the square dedicated to the bus stops was reopened.

The 2025 renewed Piazza dei Cinquecento

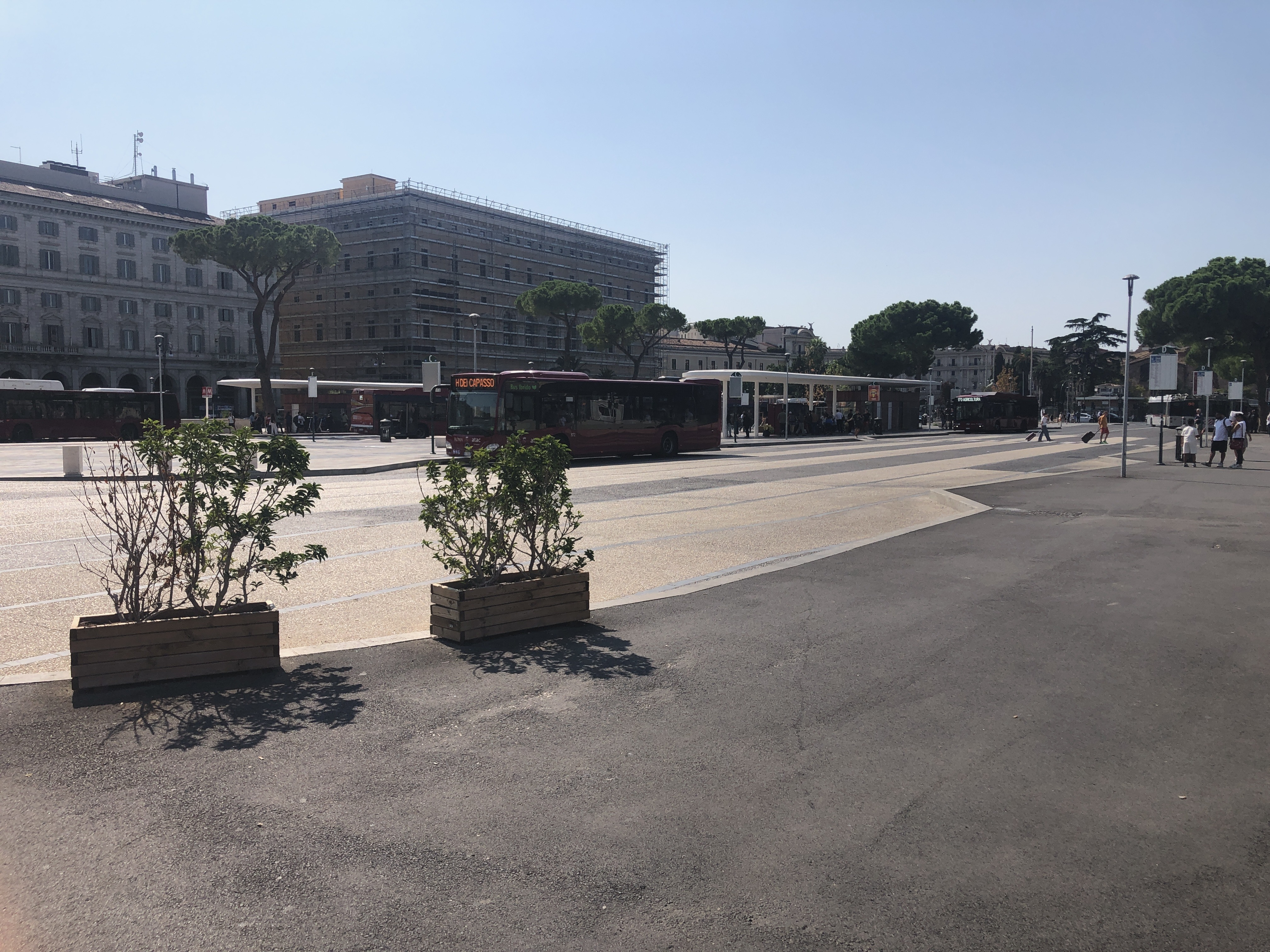

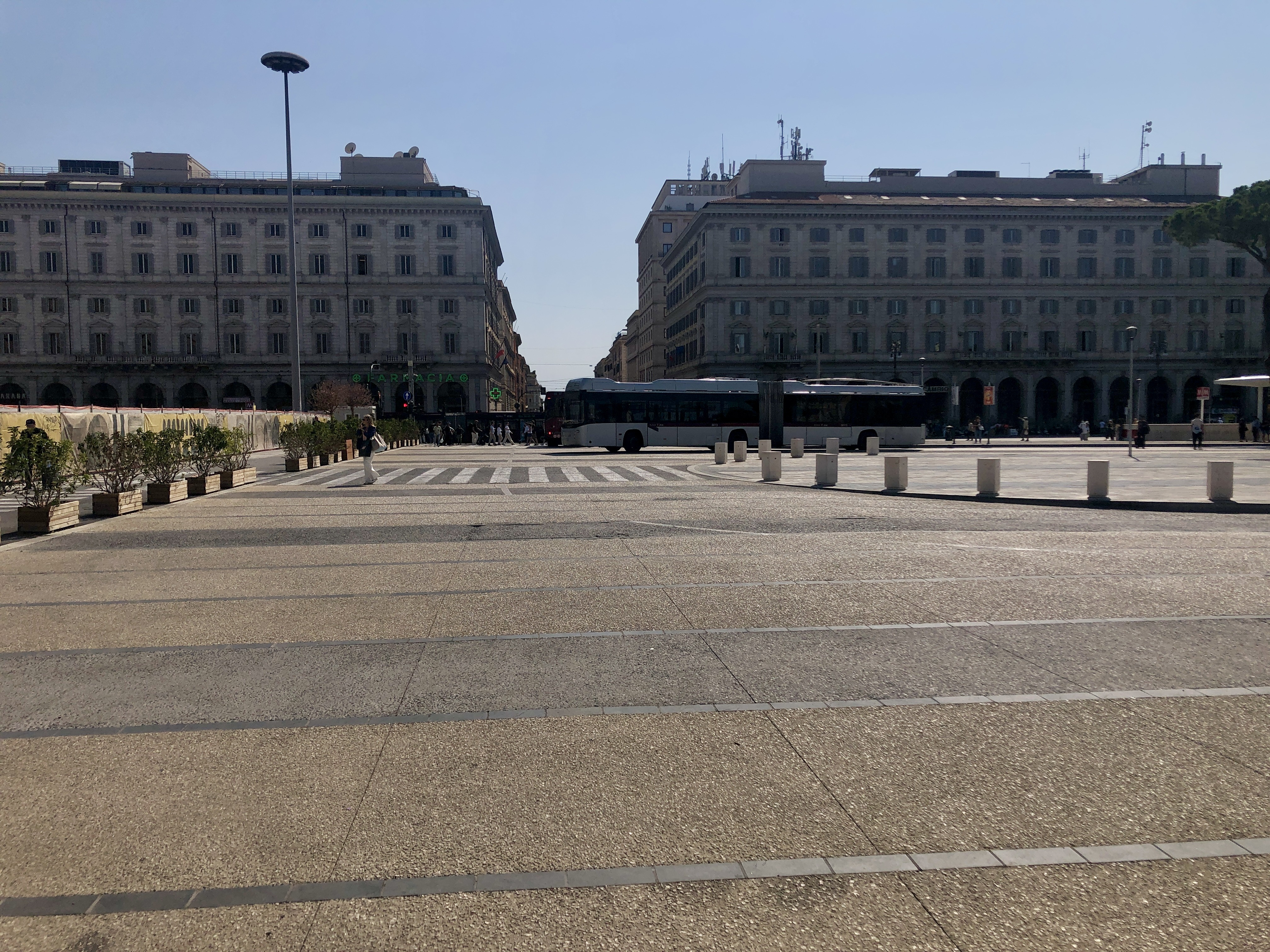

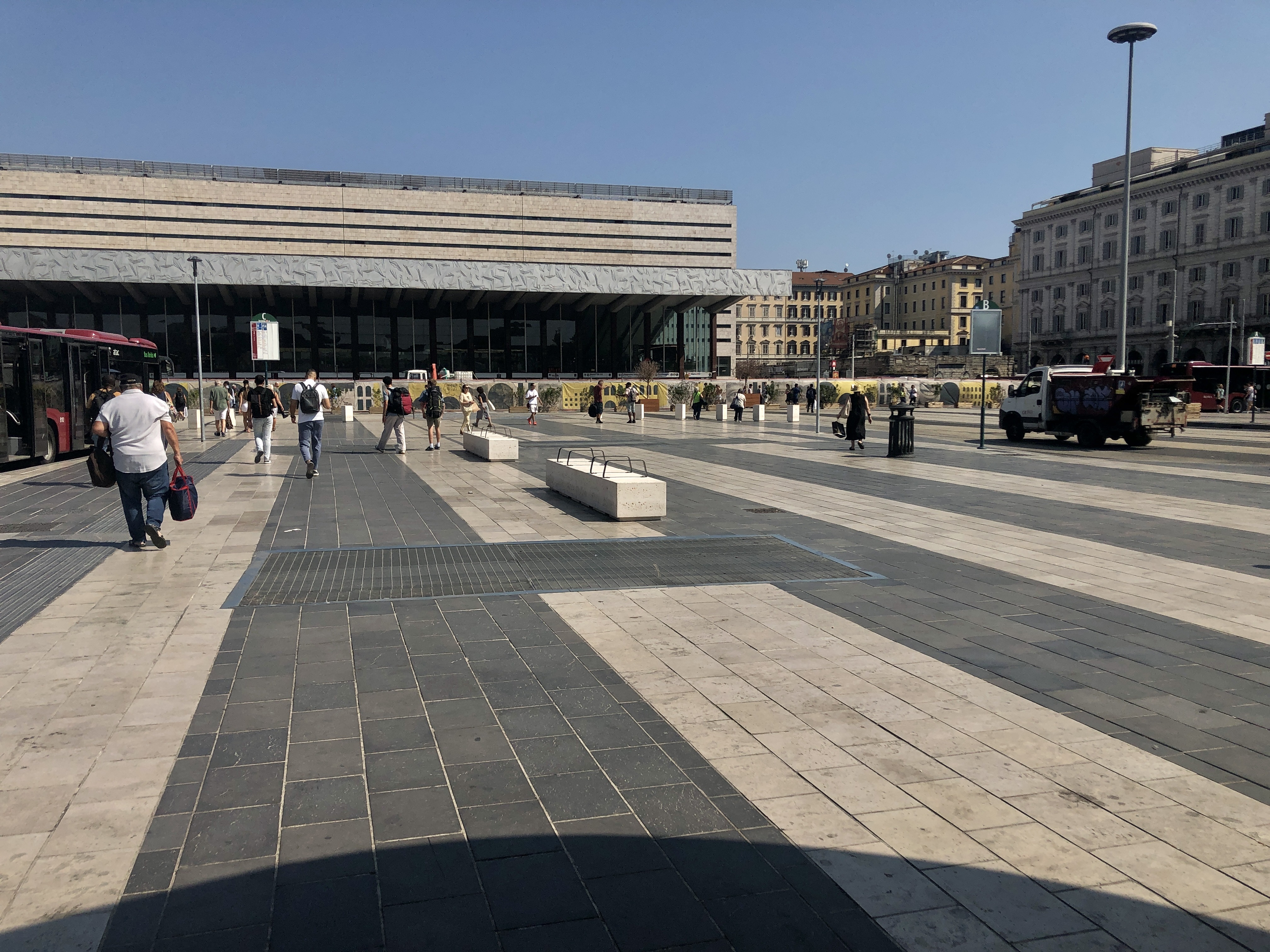

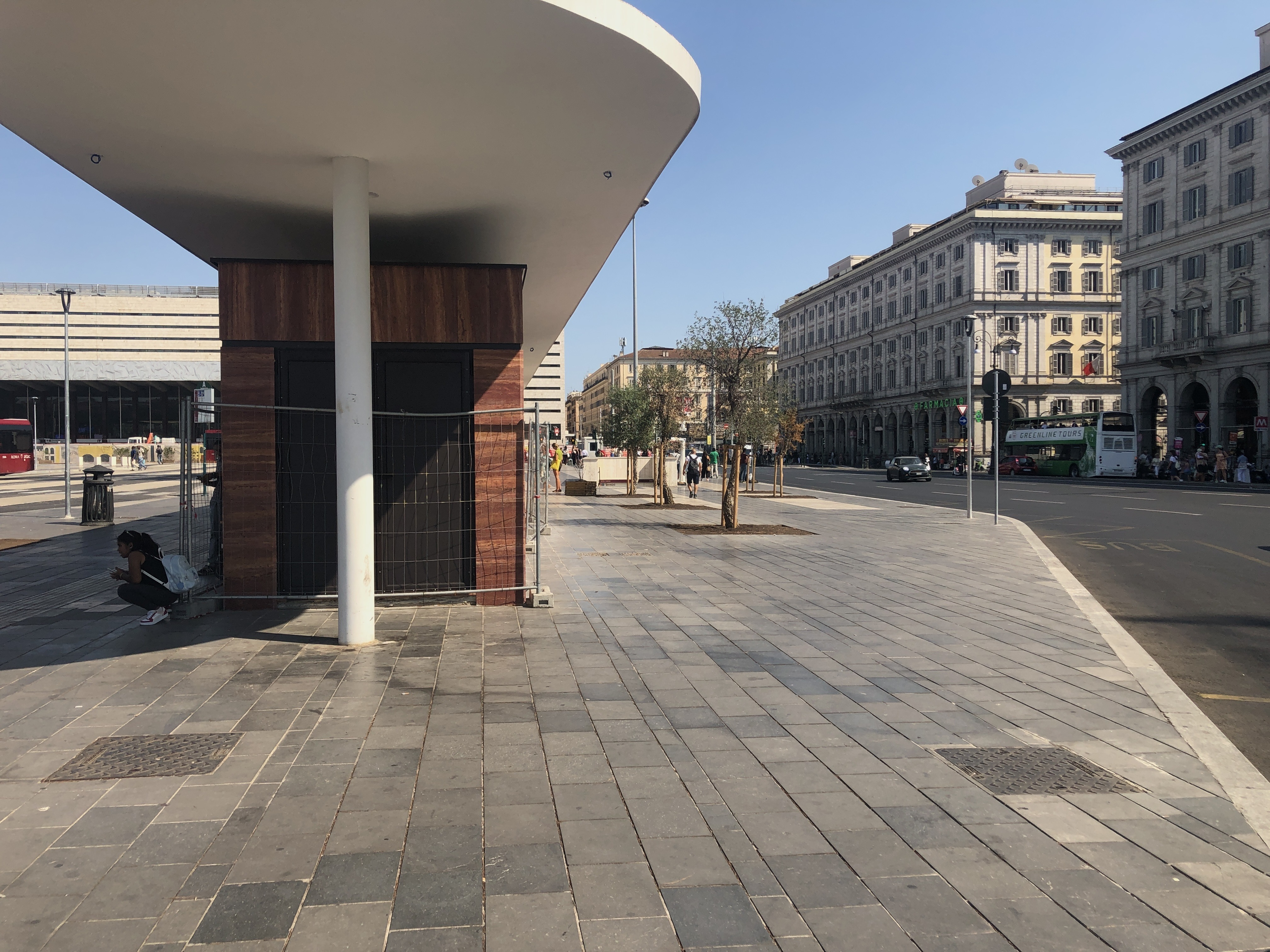

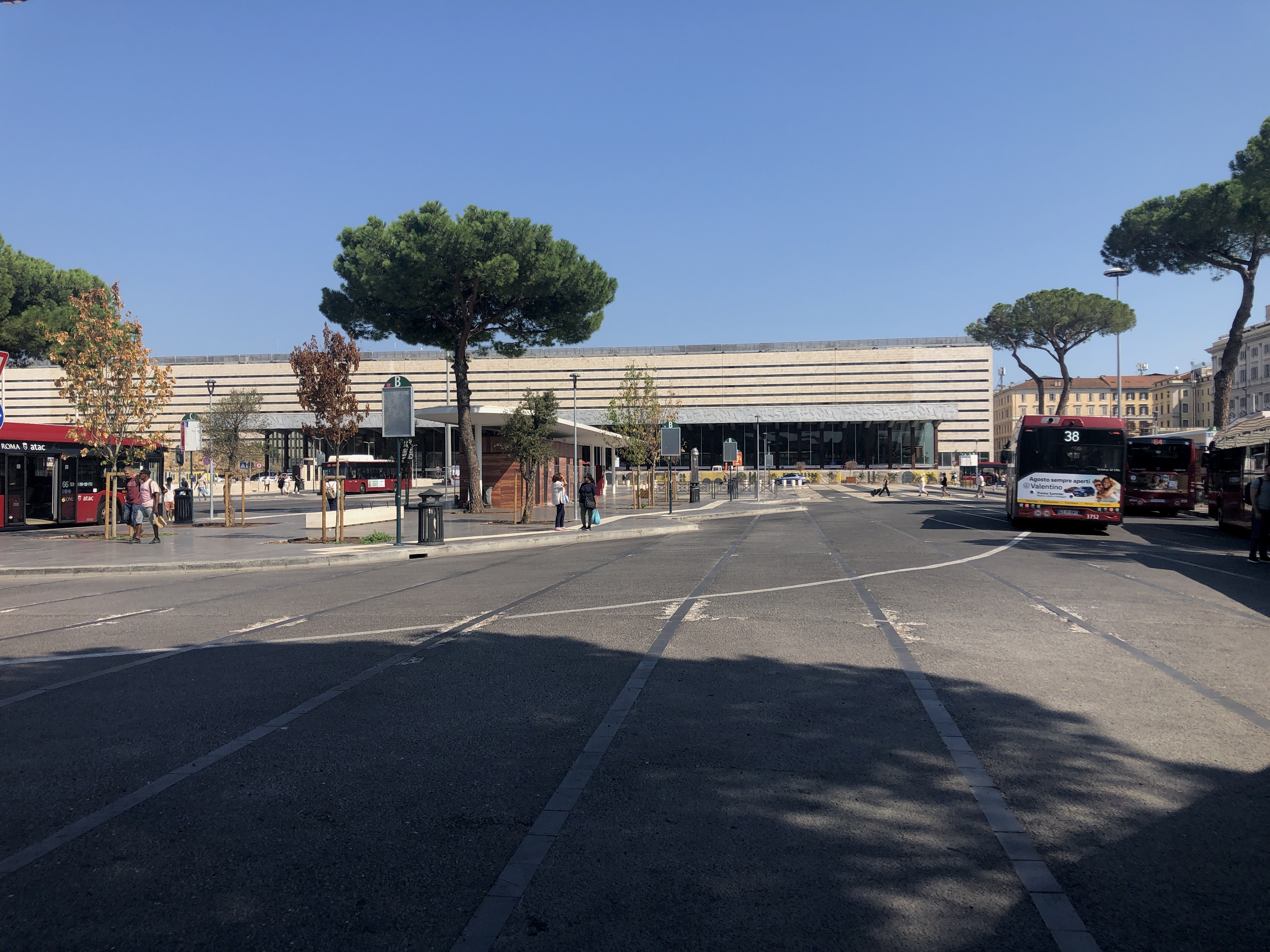

== Description ==
Nowadays the piazza is the terminus of many bus lines and serves also as an entrance to the Roma Termini train station and its shopping centre.

It contains the intersection of the two main Rome metro lines, the Line A and the Line B, in the Termini station.
