= Francesco Durante (surgeon) =

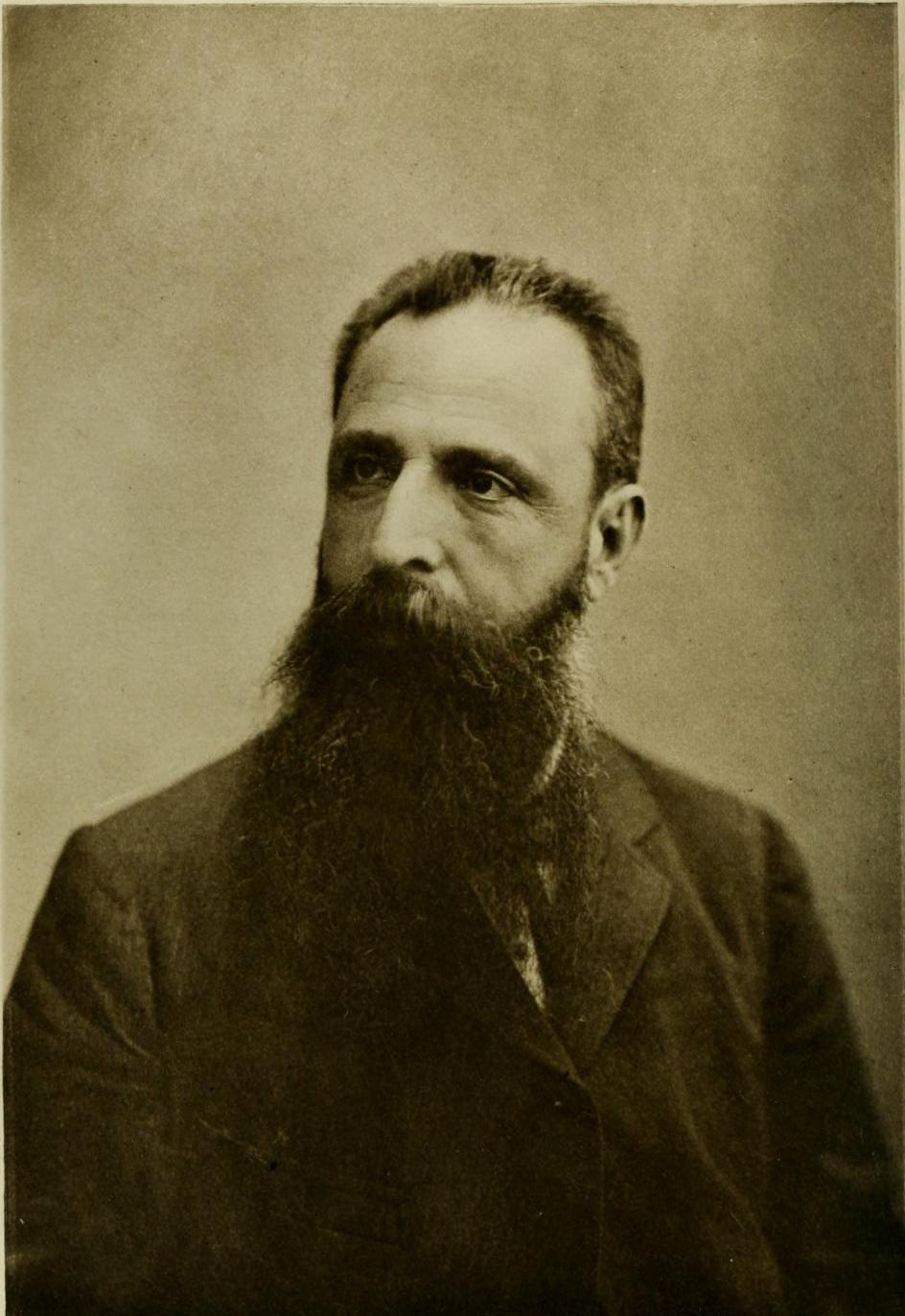
- Born: June 29, 1844; Letojanni, Sicily
- Died: October 2, 1934; Letojanni, Sicily
- Scientific career
- Fields: medicine

Francesco Durante (29 June 1844 – 2 October 1934) was an Italian politician and surgeon. He was the first to perform a brain surgery in 1884 in Rome.

== Biography ==
=== Childhood ===
Francesco Durante was born in Letojanni on 29 June 1844 to Giovanna Giuseppa Galeano and Domenico Durante.

His father was elected mayor of Letojanni (from March 1880 to May 1884) and transferred the administrative seat of the municipality from Gallodoro to the small seaside village of Letojanni. After the death of his mother Giovanna Giuseppa Galeano, Francesco’s father entrusted him to the care of a religious tutor of Taormina Don di Blasi who directed him in the choice of studies.

=== Formation ===
From Taormina he moved to Messina where he completed the humanistic preparation always under the guidance of the elderly priest. In the Peloritan city he matured the decision to enroll in the Faculty of Medicine of Naples where he successfully graduated on January 7, 1868. Soon after that, Francesco Durante explained to his father the need to attend the most prestigious European centres, both in terms of research and clinical activity. This need to confront other realities represents an important moment in the training of the young doctor.

During a call for tenders related to the recruitment of a surgeon at the Santa Maria Nuova hospital in Florence, passed the test and immediately began to work. His activity soon stopped, because he was offered the opportunity to attend, by means of a scholarship, the laboratory of pathological anatomy of the great Rudolf Virchow. Before reaching Berlin he attended Theodore Billroth’s surgery school; at that time he was considered the best surgeon of the digestive system (Billroth II). Durante had the opportunity to learn advanced techniques and improve them in order to share his knowledge with his students. Teaching will be the main goal, which he will practice for almost fifty years.

== First achievements in the medical field ==
Durante’s exposure to leading medical researchers of the period influenced the development of his ideas on tumor formation. He contributed to the formulation of the Cohnheim–Durante theory of tumors, which proposed that tumors may arise from embryonic cell remnants. The theory was developed independently of Julius Cohnheim, a pupil of Rudolf Virchow in Berlin, although the two researchers never met.

This theory is based on the hypothesis that point and random alterations of nuclear DNA would give rise to tumour clones capable of growing and metastasizing at any time. Recently, the Cohnheim–Durante Theory has been revived in the light of the revaluation of stem cells.

He left the Institute of Pathological Anatomy of Berlin, taking advantage of the outbreak of the Franco-Prussian War, in which he participated as head of the German Red Cross. On that occasion a Prussian frontline soldier had an impressive haemorrhage from the rupture of the subclavian vein. Taking the patient to the rear would have been too risky and valuable time would have been wasted. Durante decides to run to the front in no man's land with the risk of being hit by the opposing fire, he manages to block the bleeding and attach the stumps of the interrupted vase. For this gesture, when the Prussian ambassador reaches Paris, he seeks Durante, to award him an honour on behalf of the King of Prussia, but does not find him. Through diplomatic channels, his father Domenico is reached who, unaware of what happened, tracks down his son asking:

"Francesco, what have you done?" And he proudly replied, "Dad nothing you should be ashamed of."

He later attended surgery classes held in London by W. Ferguson and T. Spencer, but this stay lasts little and he observes that the sterilization of the surgical instruments takes place by boiling or by the use of dry stoves. His European experience, throughout various prestigious research institutes and clinics certainly contributed to the completion Durante's medical training.

=== Scientific career in Rome ===
Between 1872 and 1873 we find him in Rome, where he dedicated himself with great impetus to basic scientific research at professor Todaro's histology laboratory. It is a period of intense work that sees him engaged in completing some research started abroad and published the first two years in German and the third in French, "On the Organisation of the Thrombin in the Walls of the Vessels". It was not until 1887 at the International Congress in Washington that Durante presented two scientific contributions in English: the first on the "Creation of an Artificial Year as a Preliminary Treatment of Rectal-Colic Disease" and a second on the "Technique for Removal of Endocranial Tumors". The remaining research is published in Italian, as well as almost all of his subsequent scientific production, which has more than 100 works. His scientific publications cover different fields of medicine and are produced over a period of more than forty years, from 1870 to 1919.

In 1873 Costanzo Mazzone, called him as an assistant to the chair of surgical clinic of the University of Rome, teaching surgical anatomy, which he carries out with great passion in the old headquarters of the San Giacomo degli Incurabili hospital between Via di Ripetta and Via del Corso near the Mausoleum of Augustus. That was the first university chair, which he obtained together with the benevolence of his students. In 1874 he participated in a competition for a place of Ordinary Professor of Pathological Anatomy at the Faculty of Medicine and Surgery of the University of Catania, but he refused. This decision was influenced by the Roman scientific environment, which seemed to be more suitable for his interests. Considering the Unification of Italy, the University of Rome would soon become a prestigious international venue. In the academic year 1877-1878 he obtained the chair of surgical pathology and then in 1881 the role of ordinary professor of the same discipline. In 1885, after the death of his master Costanzo Mazzone, he obtained the direction of the surgical clinic in Rome. Durante became Senator of the Kingdom of Italy in the 16th Legislature. He was one of the first surgeons in Italy and in the world to successfully remove brain tumours. During the First World War, he gave his all and besides avoided the mutilation of thousands of soldiers. In 1908 he moved to Messina, with a load of medical materials and with a group of volunteers and developed surgical pavilions. He followed Hippocrates' doctrine and became president of the Order of Surgeons in Italy. In 1919 he decided to leave Rome and to return definitively to Sicily. He retired to private life in his home in Letojanni where he died on 2 October 1934.

== Surgery of interest ==
Even though his personal predisposition to the oncologic surgery, he was interested in the treatment of otorhinolaryngologic tumours, especially in those of larynx, oral cavity and tongue. This is due to the fact that at the time, ORL specialisation didn’t exist as a subject in the university. Only in 1890, thanks to Baccelli’s contribute, Durante decided to use some rooms of Policlinico Umberto I in order to focus better on the study of ORL. On 19 April 1883, he performed the first laryngectomy in Italy, which wasn’t successfully. He then decided to improve the procedure of the time with his new techniques, which will result efficaciously. Durante cared about the individuality of patients, believing that adapting every surgery to the diversity of the single one was the right thing to do. Since he was the only clinic surgeon in Rome, Francesco Durante decided to intensify his professional activity by reaching the aristocratic, political and royal environments. He became the personal doctor of King Umberto I and, subsequently, of the whole Savoia family.

== Private life ==
In 1876 he married Amalia Cocchi, from whom he had four daughters and one son. The marriage will last for twenty-five years. Despite the era, the wife was constantly involved in Durante's activities to the point that they were considered one of the most tight-knit couples.

== Designation of Senator for Life ==
Durante was nominated Senator for Life on 26 January 1889 at the age of forty-four for his scientific achievements in the presence of King Umberto I di Savoia. He used this opportunity to create a network of influential people around him, crucial for his future battles for reforms in academic and clinical activities with the aim to make Rome the Capital of the kingdom. He focused on two important issues: insufficient space and inadequate salaries for professors.

== Policlinico Umberto I ==
Another important battle Durante fought side by side with Guido Baccelli was the construction of a new hospital in Rome, that will later be called “Policlinico Umberto I” in the name of the king who granted the 10.000.000 Lire necessary for the construction, which started on 19 January 1888. Durante will continue to fight for better hygiene and overall conditions in the hospital environment, applying the knowledge he gathered during his years abroad. The construction of the Policlinico Umberto I was finished in 1902; it comprised forty-nine buildings connected to each other via tunnels that allowed for the separation of the patients according to their disease in order to prevent their spread inside the hospital.

== Honors ==
- Cavaliere di Gran Croce decorato di Gran Cordone dell'Ordine della Corona d'Italia
- Cavaliere dell'Ordine Civile di Savoia
- Cavaliere dell'Ordine dei Santi Maurizio e Lazzaro

== Works ==
- Estirpazione di un tumore endocranico (forma morbosa prima e dopo l'operazione), in Bull. d. R. Acc. med. di Roma, XI, 1885, pp. 247-252
- Indirizzo alla diagnosi chirurgica dei tumori, 1879
- Trattato di patologia e terapia chirurgica generale e speciale (3 vol.), Dante Alighieri, Roma, 1895
- Nesso fisio-patologico tra la struttura dei nei materni e la genesi di alcuni tumori maligni, in Arch. di chir. prat., 1874

== Bibliography ==
- Enzo Bruzzi, Francesco Durante, siciliano immortale precursore della clinica chirurgica moderna, Messina 1984.
- Aldo Garrozzo, Francesco Durante, Ottobre 2013.
- Giuseppe Arnocida, "Francesco Durante" in Dizionario Biografico degli Italiani, vol. 42 (1993) su treccani.it
