= Policlinico (Rome Metro) =

Rome metro station

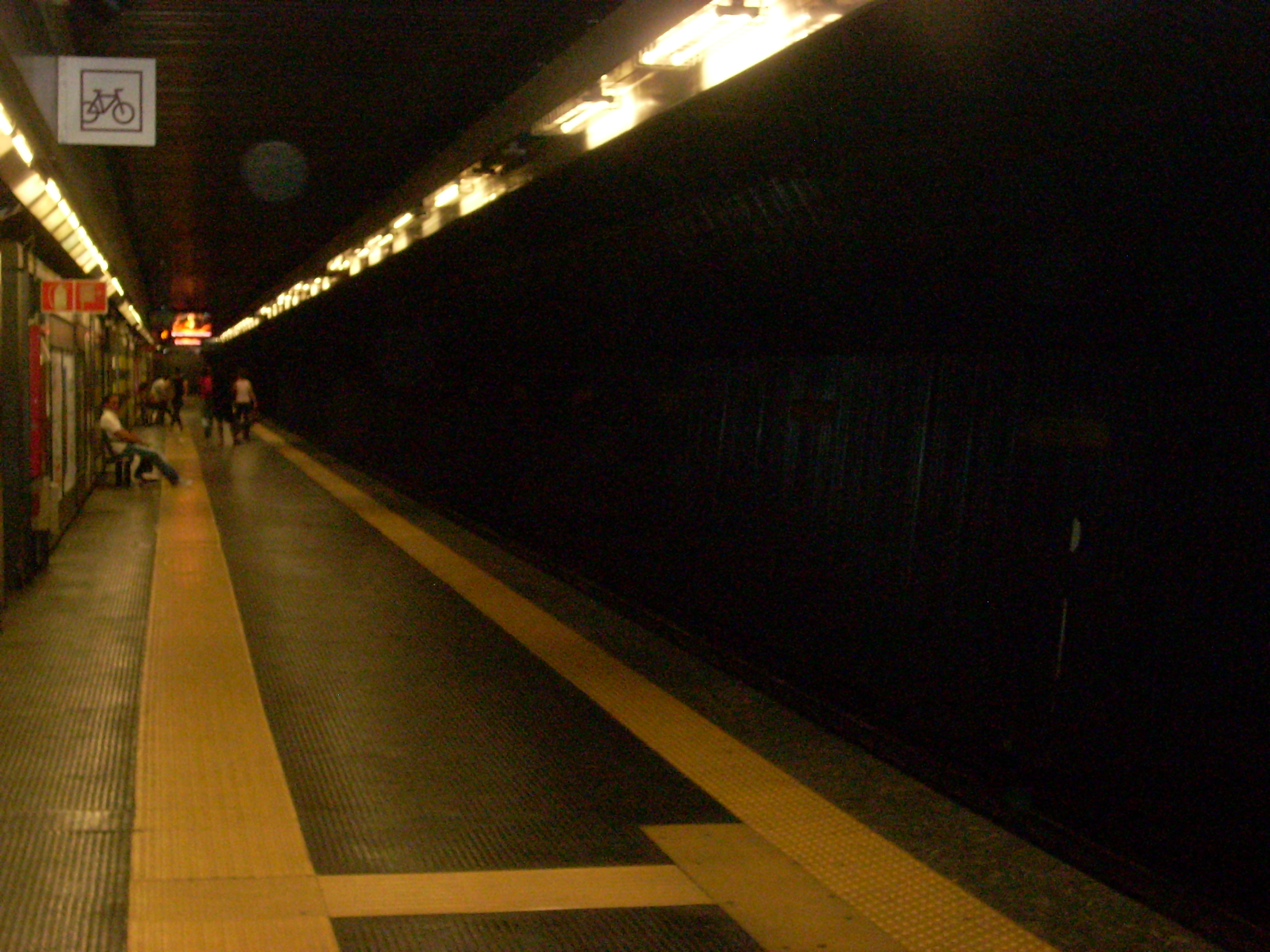
- Platform of the station on Viale Regina Margherita

General information
- Coordinates: 41°54′32″N 12°30′42″E
- Owner: ATAC

Construction
- Structure type: Underground

History
- Opened: 1990; 36 years ago

Services
Preceding station	Rome Metro	Following station
Castro Pretorio towards Laurentina	Line B	Bologna towards Rebibbia or Jonio
Location
- Click on the map to see marker

Policlinico is a station on Line B of the Rome Metro. It is named after the nearby Policlinico Umberto I. It is located in Piazza Sassari, at the intersection with Viale Regina Margherita, Viale Regina Elena and Via Giovanni Maria Lancisi. It was opened in 1990.

== Surroundings ==
- Policlinico Umberto I
- Sapienza University of Rome
- Villa Torlonia
- Campo Verano

== Services ==
- Ticket machine
- Accessibility for the Handicap
- Elevator
- Escalators
- Station video surveillance
- Newsstand
- Vending machines for snacks and drinks
- Public transport surface
- Ad sound arrival and departure trains
- SOS services
