= Via Cavour, Rome =

Thoroughfare in Rome, Italy

Coordinates: 41°53′47″N 12°29′42″E

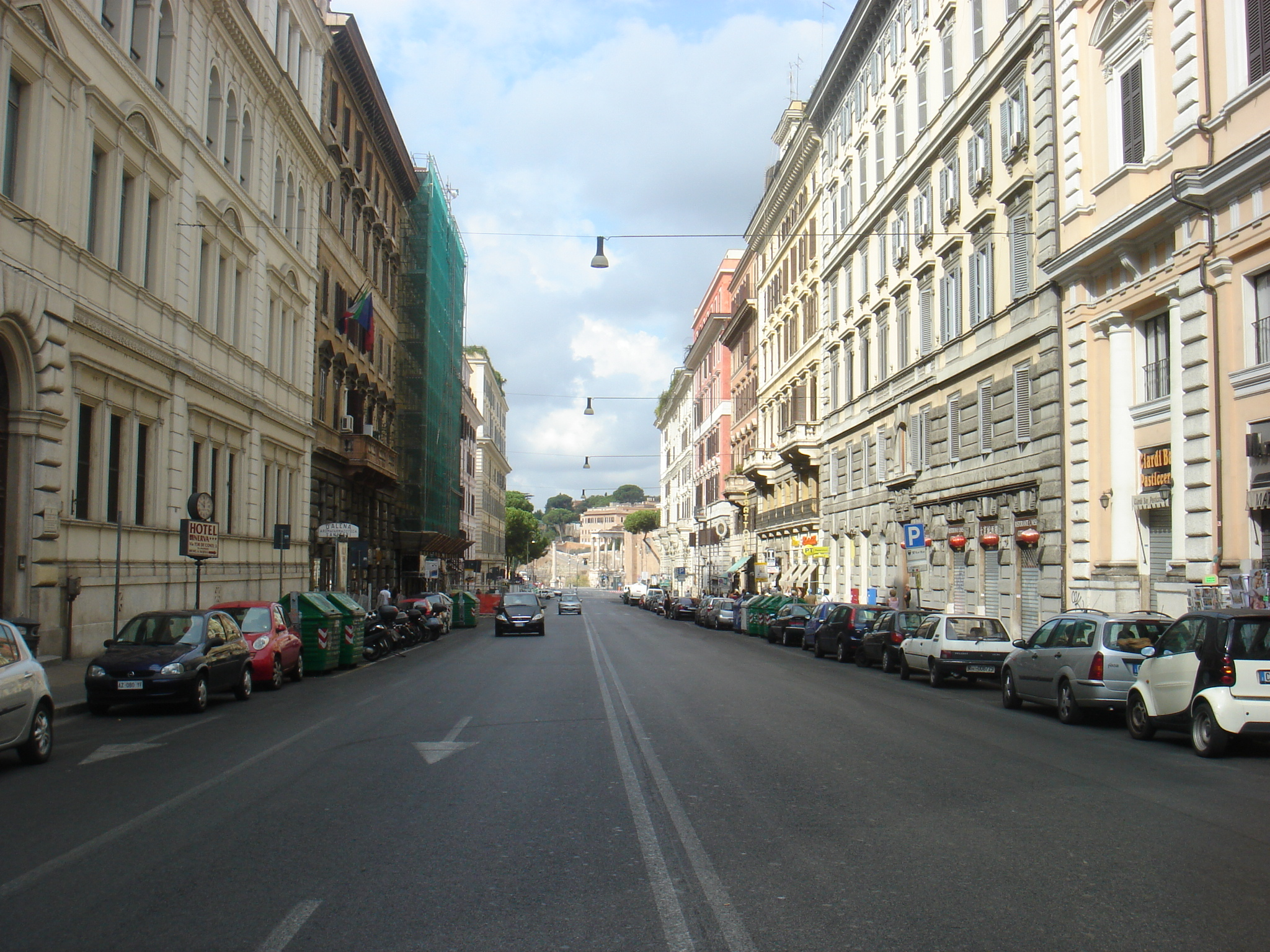
Via Cavour

Via Cavour is a street in the Castro Pretorio and Monti rioni of Rome, named after Camillo Cavour. It is served by the Rome Metro stations Cavour and Termini. The facade of the original permanent Roma Termini railway station reached this street, though it is now 200 metres further back towards the Esquiline. It runs from the Piazza del Cinquecento north of Termini Station, near the Baths of Diocletian, south-westward past the basilicas of Santa Maria Maggiore and San Pietro in Vincoli, and concludes at the Roman Forum, a total distance of 1.3 kilometres (13/16 mi). The street houses a large number of hotels and restaurants.

== See also ==
Via Cavour in Florence
