= Termini (Rome Metro) =

Rome metro station

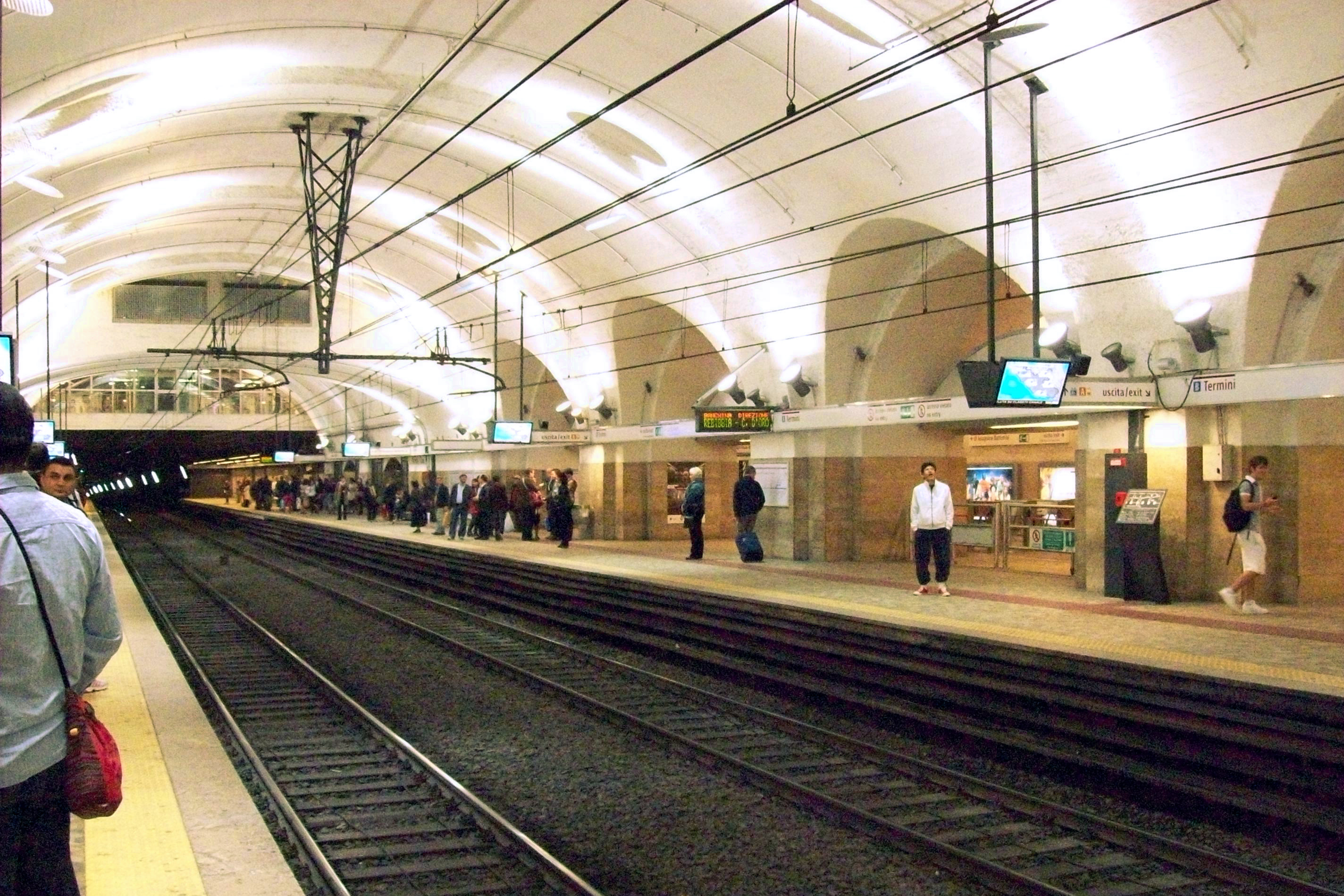
- Line B platforms

General information
- Coordinates: 41°54′05″N 12°30′02″E
- Owner: ATAC
- Platforms: 1 island platform (Line A); 2 side platforms (Line B)
- Tracks: 4 (2 on each level)
- Connections: Termini railway station

Construction
- Structure type: Underground

History
- Opened: 10 February 1955; 71 years ago

Services
Preceding station	Rome Metro	Following station
Repubblica towards Battistini	Line A	Vittorio Emanuele towards Anagnina
Cavour towards Laurentina	Line B	Castro Pretorio towards Rebibbia or Jonio
Location
- Click on the map to see marker

Termini is an underground station of the Rome Metro. The station was inaugurated on 10 February 1955 as a station on Line B, and later became an interchange with Line A. The station is found in Piazza dei Cinquecento, under the Termini rail terminal. Together, the two stations form the main public transport hub in the city.

Termini is currently the only station in the Rome Metro system to serve both Lines A and B.

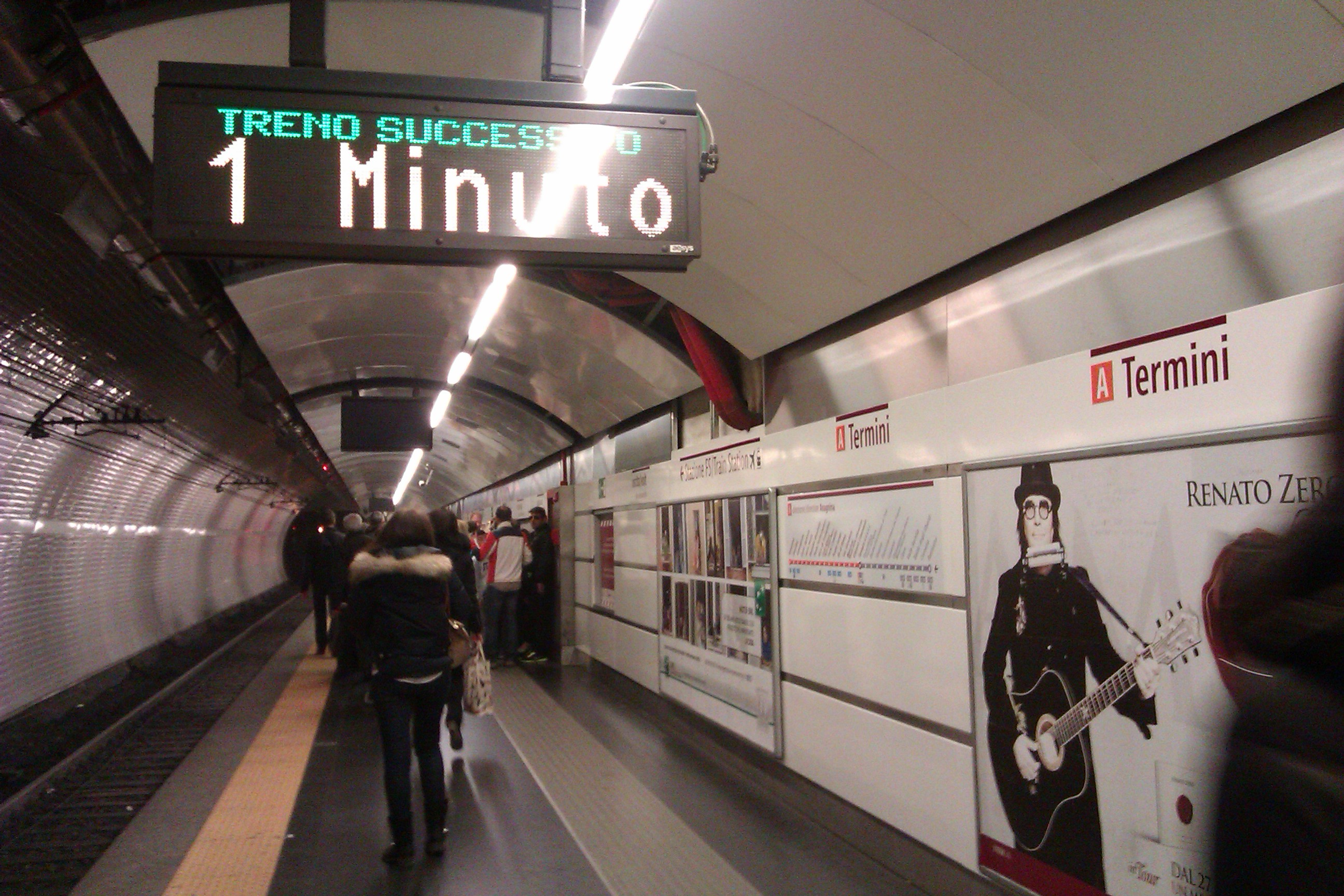
Line A platform

== Services ==
This station has:

- Ticket office
- Escalators

== Interchanges ==
- Termini interchange station for Line B and Line A on the Rome Metro.
- 5 – 14 (Tram Line) – H – 38 – 40 Express – 64 – 66 – 70 – 75 – 82 – 90 Express – 92 – 105 – 150F – 223 – 310 – 590 – 714 – 910 – nMA – nMB – nMB1 – n5 – n8 – n11 – n46 – n66 – n70 – n92 – n98 – n543 – n716 – C2 – C3

== Located nearby ==
- Baths of Diocletian
- Museo Nazionale Romano
- Basilica di Santa Maria Maggiore
- Esquilino
- Via Cavour
- Via Merulana
- Sapienza University of Rome
