= Cavour (Rome Metro) =

Rome metro station

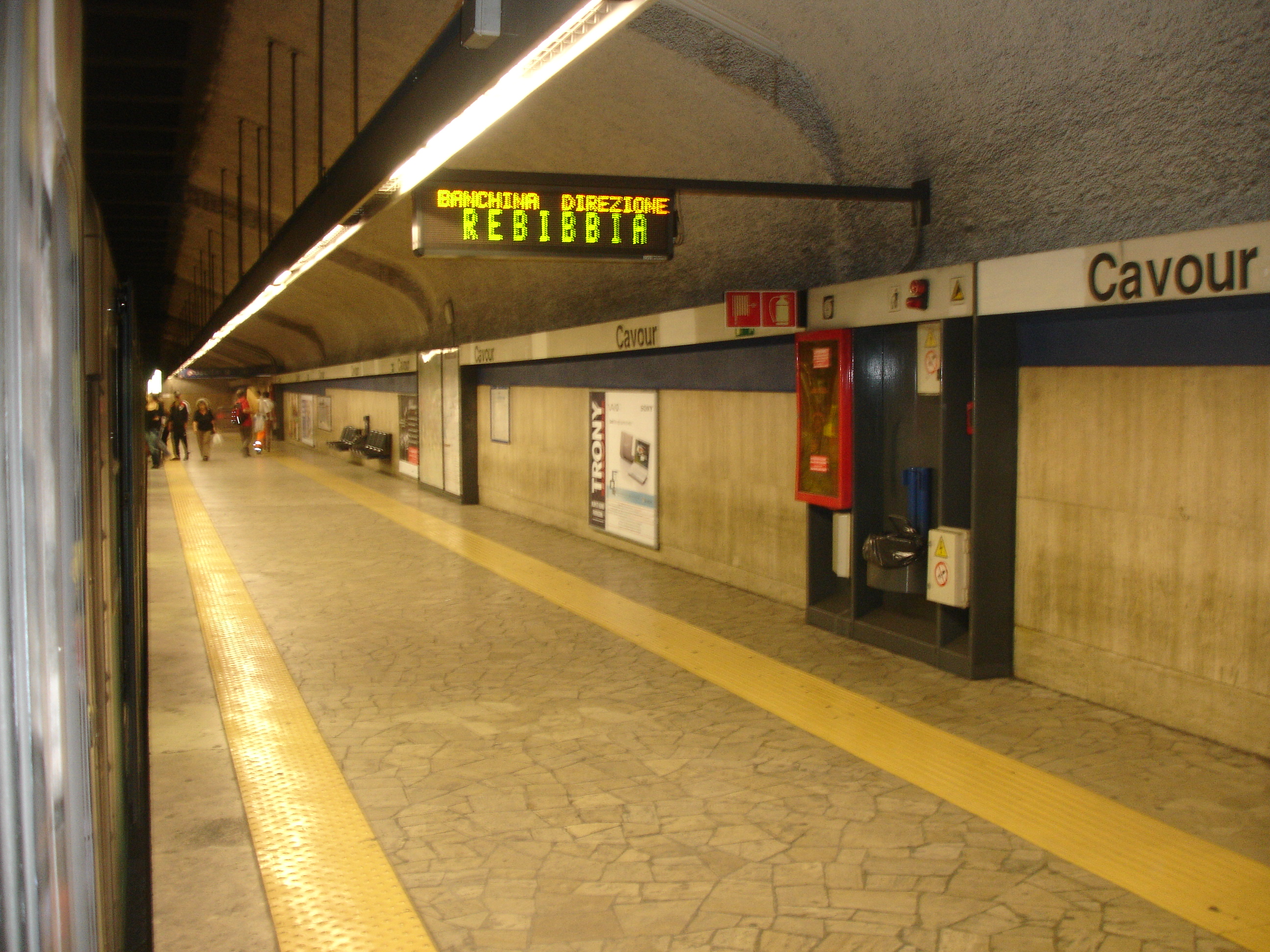

General information
- Coordinates: 41°53′42″N 12°29′37″E
- Owner: ATAC

Construction
- Structure type: Underground

History
- Opened: 10 February 1955; 71 years ago

Services
Preceding station	Rome Metro	Following station
Colosseo towards Laurentina	Line B	Termini towards Rebibbia or Jonio
Location
- Click on the map to see marker

Cavour is a station on Line B of the Rome Metro, opened on 10 February 1955. It is located on via Cavour, in the Monti rione of Rome, midway between Santa Maria Maggiore and via dei Fori Imperiali.

== Nearby ==
- Imperial forums
- Parco di Traiano
- Trajan's Market
- Palazzo Del Grillo
- Palazzo Koch, HQ of the Banca d'Italia
- Engineering faculty of the "la Sapienza"
- San Pietro in Vincoli
- Viminal Hill

== Streets and piazzas ==
- Via dei Serpenti
- Via del Boschetto
- Via Panisperna
- Piazza della Suburra
- Salita dei Borgia

== Churches ==
- San Pietro in Vincoli
- Madonna dei Monti - Church of Santa Maria dei Monti
- Basilica di Santa Maria Maggiore
- San Martino ai Monti
- Basilica di Santa Prassede
- Basilica di Santa Pudenziana
