= Castro Pretorio =

- Rione of Rome
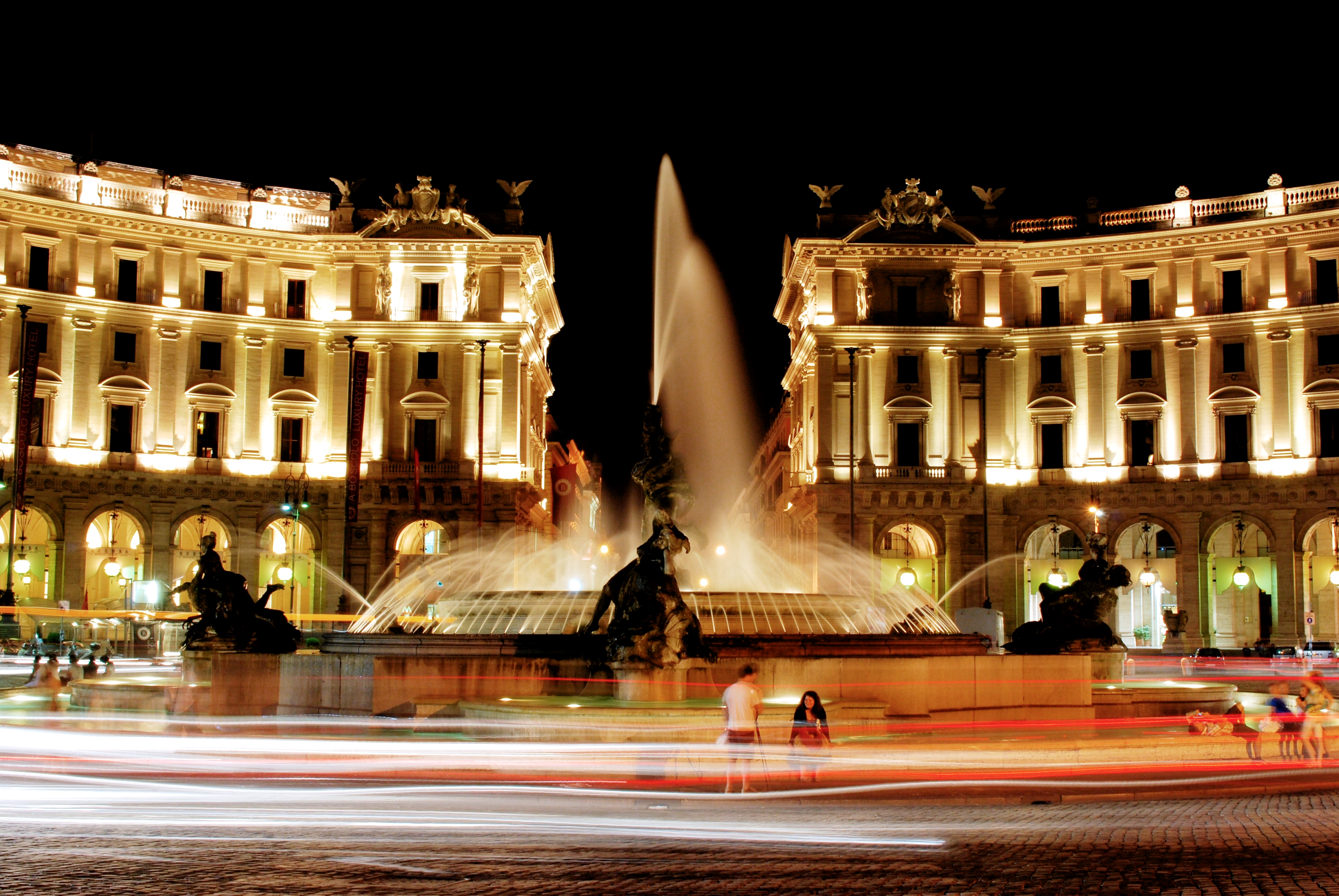
- Piazza della Repubblica

- Seal

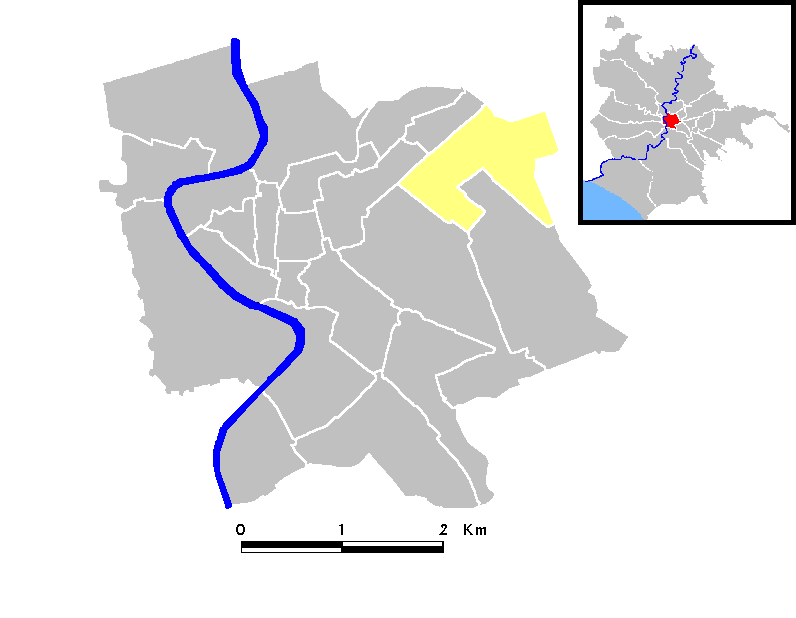
- Position of the rione within the center of the city
- Country: Italy
- Region: Lazio
- Province: Rome
- Comune: Rome

Area
  - Total: 0.4005 sq mi (1.0374 km^{2})

Population
  - Total: 5,341
  - Density: 13,330/sq mi (5,148/km^{2})
- (Note: Roma Capitale – Roma Statistica. Population inscribed in the resident register at 31 December 2016 by toponymy subdivision.)
- Time zone: UTC+1 (CET)
  - Summer (DST): UTC+2 (CEST)

Castro Pretorio is the 18th rione of Rome, Italy, identified by the initials R. XVIII, and it is located within the Municipio I. The rione takes its name by the ruins of the Castrum Praetorium, the barracks of the Praetorian Guard, included in the Aurelian Walls.

== History ==
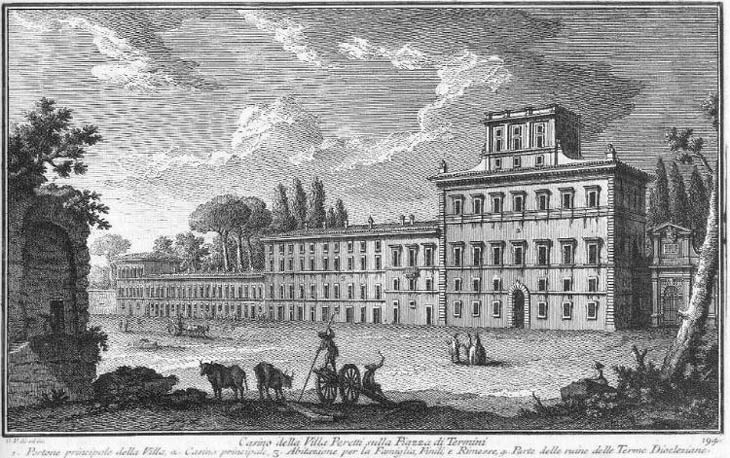
Engraving by Giuseppe Vasi showing Villa Peretti (later Villa Negroni)

During the Imperial age, the area belonged to the regio Alta Semita (Latin for 'high pathway'). At that time, a huge part of the present-day rione was gloomy and infamous, as it housed the Campus Sceleratus, a large area just outside Porta Collina (between Via Venti Settembre and Piazza dell'Indipendenza) where Vestal virgins who infringed their chastity vows were buried alive.

Another landmark of the borough was the Castra Praetoria, the barracks of the Praetorian Guard established by Tiberius between AD 21 and AD 23, later incorporated into the Aurelian Walls.

Between 298 and 306, to serve the densely populated quarters of the Quirinal, Viminal and Esquiline hills, the majestic Baths of Diocletian were built, whose remains can still be seen along Via Cernaia and in Piazza dei Cinquecento. The baths occupied the area between Piazza della Repubblica, Piazza dei Cinquecento, Via Volturno and Via Venti Settembre. They definitively ceased activity in 537, due to the cutting of the aqueducts during the Gothic war.

In the eastern part of Piazza dei Cinquecento there was the agger of Servius Tullius, located near the former Porta Viminale, whose remains still rise in front of the Termini railway station. In the rione there were two other gates that no longer exist, Porta Collina and Porta Nomentana, belonging to the Servian and to the Aurelian Walls respectively.

Following to the fall of the Western Roman Empire, Rome began to depopulate, and the area of the rione was among the first boroughs to be abandoned, being peripheral, unsafe and lacking of water. In the following centuries, little hamlets arose only around some major churches, such as the basilicas of Santa Prassede, Santa Pudenziana and Santa Maria Maggiore, thanks to their convents.

During the Renaissance, Sixtus V promoted the urbanisation of the area, with the construction of the Strada Felice, a 2 kilometers straight line between Trinità dei Monti and Santa Croce in Gerusalemme (it coincides with the present-day Via Sistina, Via delle Quattro Fontane and Via Agostino Depretis) and of the Acquedotto Felice: both the road and the aqueduct recall the name of the Pope, Felice Peretti. The refurbishments promoted by Sixtus V also involved the intersection between Via Sistina and Via Pia, where the Quattro Fontane were positioned, thus creating a scenic viewpoint where people used to stop in summertime and enjoy "the good air", which is unimaginable today. It must be said that Cardinal Peretti had shown his great interest in this area even before he became Pope, as he ordered the construction of a huge villa, with a park richly adorned with fountains and portals, between Santa Maria Maggiore and the present Via Marsala and Via del Viminale. (Note: The villa, which later became Villa Montalto Peretti Massimo, was demolished immediately after the unification of Italy for the urbanization of the area and today no trace remains of it, with the only exception of the Fontana del Prigione now in Trastevere.)

In the 17th century some Jesuits, back from a mission in the Far East, established here and nicknamed the borough Macao: the name was widely used up to the post-war period and is currently evoked by a street of the rione (Via del Macao).

After the Capture of Rome, the rione experienced a feverish development, just as the other rioni that were urbanized at the time, and a number of huge stile Umbertino palaces, such as the headquarters of the Ministers of Treasury and of Defence, were built alongside Via Venti Settembre; relevant arteries were also opened, such as Via Nazionale and Via Cavour. In the same period, two important Roman squares were built (Piazza dell'Indipendenza, with a central garden, and the monumental Piazza della Repubblica, with the Fontana delle Naiadi in the center and the two large Savoy palaces with arcades on the sides, following the exedra of the Baths on which the square was built), as well as a number of luxury buildings, like the Albergo Quirinale, the Grand Hotel and the Teatro Costanzi (the current Teatro dell'Opera di Roma). The original core (the present one dates back to a complete twentieth-century reconstruction) of the Termini railway station was also built.

Between 1883 and 1886, Villa Peretti Massimo was demolished, and Palazzo Massimo alle Terme was built in place of it, to house the Collegio Massimo, a Jesuit school: it is now the main seat of the National Roman Museum.

=== Coat or arms ===
Gules, Praetorians insignia Or.

The coat of arms is the labarum of the Praetorian Guard in gold on a red background. (Note: Note that the coat of arms of the rione was established by Council Resolution no. 20 of 20 August 1921, which describes it without showing its image. The image that is most frequently used, that is a "generic" sign of a legion with an aquila, is historically inaccurate for two reasons: first, the Resolution evidently referred to the "specific" insignia of the Praetorian guard (with reference to the Castra Praetoria), that is, the scorpio which appeared on the vexilla of the guard as a sign of gratitude towards the Emperor Tiberius (who was born under this zodiac sign); second, the aquila could only be carried by the Aquilifer of a legion, and certainly could not appear on the vexillum of the Praetorians, who could not form a legion since they resided within the city.)

== Geography ==
=== Boundaries ===
To the north-west, Castro Pretorio borders with Sallustiano (R. XVII), from which is separated by Via XX Settembre, up to Porta Pia. To the north-east, Castro Pretorio borders with Quartiere Nomentano (Q. V), whose boundary is outlined by the stretch of the Aurelian Walls beside Viale del Policlinico, between Porta Pia and Viale Castro Pretorio and by a portion of the Viale itself.

To the east, the rione borders with Quartiere Tiburtino (Q. VI), from which is separated by the stretch of the Aurelian Walls alongside Viale Pretoriano, up to Piazzale Sisto V and the arch of the same name.

Southward, Castro Pretorio borders with Esquilino (R. XV), whose boundary is outlined by Piazzale Sisto V, Via Marsala, Viale Enrico De Nicola, Piazza dei Cinquecento, Via Giovanni Giolitti and Via Gioberti. To the south, it also borders with Monti (R. I), whose border is marked by Via dell'Esquilino, Piazza dell'Esquilino, Via Agostino Depretis and Via delle Quattro Fontane.

Westward, it borders with Trevi (R. II), from which is separated by Via XX Settembre and Piazza San Bernardo.

=== Local geography ===
The rione shows a clearly Piedmontese road network, whose streets, straight and not too wide, follow an orthogonal pattern. This typical nineteenth-century urban plan can be found especially in the area between Via Venti Settembre, Viale Castro Pretorio, Via del Castro Pretorio and the long straight road Via Volturno-Via Marsala, with its center in the large Piazza dell'Indipendenza, the focal point of this section of the rione; a grid of secondary roads, bearing names that recall the places where the Italian wars of independence took place, radiates from the square. This is the most populated area of the rione, showing the urban coexistence of two-storey villas, stile umbertino palaces, offices and more or less luxurious hotels intended to accommodate the large number of tourists from the nearby Termini railway station.

The most monumental part of the rione, as well as most "international" one due to the large flow of tourists, is certainly Piazza della Repubblica (formerly Piazza Esedra) together with Via Nazionale, the crossroads of the Quattro Fontane and Via Cavour, important arteries connecting the railway station and the historic center.

== Monuments and places of interest ==
=== Civil buildings ===
- Palazzo Mattei Albani Del Drago, on Via delle Quattro Fontane at the corner of Via Venti Settembre. A 16th-century mannerist building (1587). 41.901988°N 12.491036°E

Project by architect Domenico Fontana commissioned by the nobleman Muzio Mattei.

- Palazzo delle Finanze, on Via Venti Settembre. A 19th-century building (1871–76).

Project by engineer Raffaele Canevari. It il the seat of the Ministry of Economy and Finance.

- Villino Centurini, on Piazza dell'Indipendenza at the corner of Via Vittorio Bachelet. A 19th-century building (1874). 41.904343°N 12.503341°E

Project by Swiss architect Henry Kleffler commissioned by Alessandro Centurini. Now it is the seat of the State High School "Niccolò Machiavelli".

- Palazzo Esercito, on Via Venti Settembre. A 19th-century building (1876–85).

Project by Bernardini and Garavaglia. It was built to house the Ministry of War of the Kingdom of Italy and the Army Staff; it still houses the latter and, since 22 February 2017, the High Command of Defence.

- Villino Semiradski, on Piazza dell'Indipendenza. A 19th-century eclectic building. 41.904929°N 12.502354°E

Project by architect Francesco Azzurri. Now it houses the Headquarters of the Carabinieri of the Bank of Italy.

- Teatro dell'Opera di Roma, on Piazza Beniamino Gigli. A 19th-century theatre building (1874–80).

Projects by architects Achille Sfondrini and Marcello Piacentini commissioned by Domenico Costanzi.

- Palazzo Giolitti, on Via Cavour at the corner of Via Torino. A 19th-century eclectic building (1888). 41.899055°N 12.497613°E

Project by architect Cesare Janz.

- Palazzo Nathan, on Via Torino. A 19th-century eclectic building (1889). 41.901647°N 12.495631°E

Project by architect Cesare Janz.

- Palazzo dei Marescialli, on Piazza dell'Indipendenza. A 20th-century building (1930). 41.904636°N 12.503377°E

Project by architect Gennaro de Matteis. It houses the High Council of the Judiciary.

- Palazzo della Federconsorzi, on Piazza dell'Indipendenza. A 20th-century modernist building (1955–57). 41.904529°N 12.501734°E

Project by architects Ignazio Guidi and Giulio Sterbini.

- Palazzo del Corriere dello Sport, on piazza dell'Indipendenza. A 20th-century modernist building (1956). 41.903970°N 12.502679°E

Project by architect Attilio Lapadula.

=== Religious buildings ===
- Basilica di Santa Maria degli Angeli e dei Martiri
- Basilica del Sacro Cuore di Gesù
- Santissimo Rosario di Pompei
- San Bernardo alle Terme
- San Paolo dentro le Mura
- Evangelic Methodist Church of Castro Pretorio

Disappeared churches

- Sant'Isidoro alle Terme
- San Caio
- San Ciriaco alle Terme di Diocleziano
- Sacra Famiglia a Via Sommacampagna
- Santa Teresa alle Quattro Fontane

=== Gates ===
- Porta Pia
- Porta Nomentana (walled-up)

=== Other monuments ===
- Baths of Diocletian
- Obelisco di Dogali

== Museums ==
- Museo Nazionale Romano delle Terme di Diocleziano
- Museo Nazionale Romano di Palazzo Massimo
- Museo storico della didattica Mauro Laeng
- Museo storico dei bersaglieri
- Museo numismatico della Zecca Italiana

== See also ==
- Castra Praetoria
