= Pietralata (Rome) =

- Quartiere of Rome
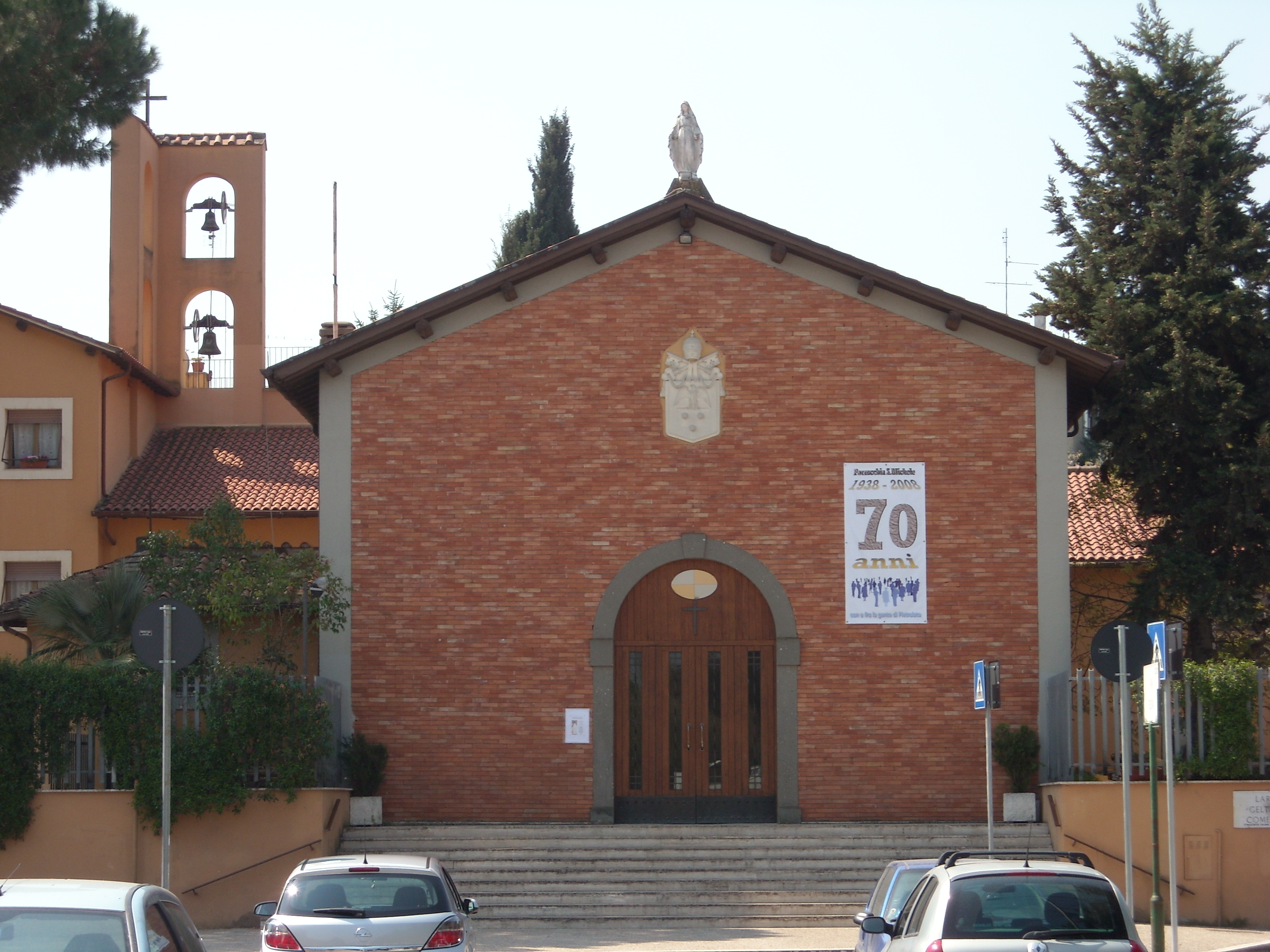
- The church of San Michele Arcangelo

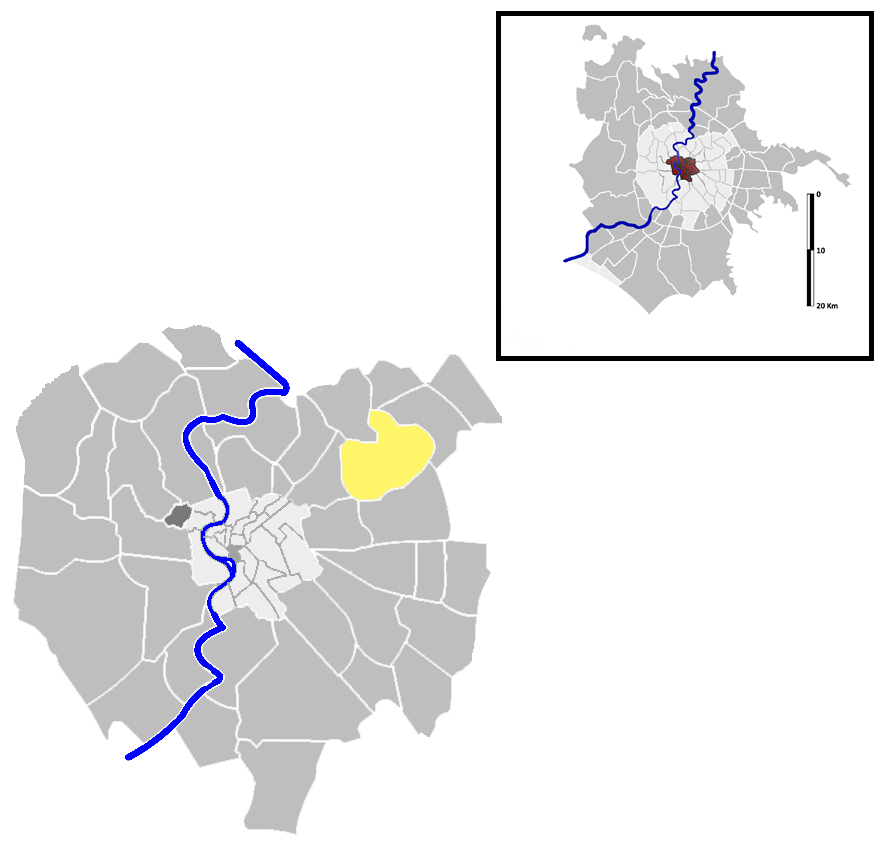
- Position of the quartiere within the city
- Coordinates: 41°54′55″N 12°33′20″E
- Country: Italy
- Region: Lazio
- Province: Rome
- Comune: Rome

Area
  - Total: 2.3033 sq mi (5.9655 km^{2})

Population (2016)
  - Total: 32,748
  - Density: 14,217.9/sq mi (5,489.56/km^{2})
- Time zone: UTC+1 (CET)
  - Summer (DST): UTC+2 (CEST)

Pietralata is the 21st quartiere of Rome, identified by the initials Q. XXI, and belongs to the Municipio IV. Its name comes from the Latin Prata Lata meaning large fields, which is possibly a reference to the large amount of nature and vegetation present.

The borough of Pietralata belonged to the Suburbio Nomentano (S. II) until 1961, when it became the 21st quarter of the city.

== History ==
Pietralata was a conspicuous estate of the Agro Romano, with an extension of about 2,150 hectares, stretching from Via Tiburtina to Via Nomentana: the estate included the Sant'Agnese valley, outside Porta Nomentana, and the Portonaccio hills, reaching the river Aniene and the Casal de' Pazzi farmstead, and also including the castle of Pietralata, built on the ruins of an ancient Roman villa. From the name of the estate derived the name of the family that owned it, whose most prominent members were Orazio di Pietralata, who lived at the beginning of the 16th century, and Giovan Battista di Pietralata, bishop of Sant'Angelo in Vado. The Pietralata family was initially succeeded by the Lante, then, after a partition, the property of the estate was transferred to the Ruberti family, to Prince Stanislaw Poniatowski and to the Mazzetti family. Thanks to the Mazzetti family, all the portions of the original estate were reunited, and in 1842 the family obtained the title of Marquis of Pietralata.

Later, the ownership was transferred to the Torlonia family and when, during the fascist period, several new suburbs (the so-called borgate) were planned in order to house the population that was moving from the center of Rome after the demolitions provided by the 1931 city plan, Pietralata became one of the 12 official borgate. Several little houses were planned, that were called "7 lire houses" because of their low price and had no bathrooms, kitchens nor running water.

On October 23, 1943, in a little valley in the countryside along Via Tiburtina, near the Ponte Mammolo cheese factory, the SS killed nine partisans of the Movimento Comunista d'Italia - Bandiera Rossa (who had previously assaulted the barracks in Forte Tiburtino to get food, weapons, ammunition and medicines) and a cyclist, who was not related to the assault. The massacre became known as the Eccidio di Pietralata (Pietralata slaughter): the victims are commemorated by a plaque in the Rebibbia prison.

This resistance episode influenced the social identity of the inhabitants of quarter that, being basically isolated from the center of the city, found in the church (particularly the Congregation of Sacramentine Sisters, which had a prominent role in schooling) and in the PCI their main references.

Starting from 1954, the old poor houses have been demolished and replaced with modern residential buildings. In the 1950s floods were quite frequent in the area, particularly because the roads had been built below the level of the Aniene. The situation improved in 1979, when the then mayor Luigi Petroselli started redevelopment works that rose the road level: the results of the works are still visible today, since some stores are below the level of the street.

Still in the 1970s, Pietralata struggles with poverty and illiteracy: there was only an elementary school, the classes had to attend lessons taking turns and many students dropped out of school. The poor situation of the quarter was depicted in several books, such as Elsa Morante's History, Pier Paolo Pasolini's Una vita violenta, Alberto Moravia's Racconti romani and Albino Bernardini's Un anno a Pietralata, which was adapted into a film, Diario di un maestro, by Vittorio De Seta.

The redevelopment of the quarter started at the end of the 1970s, with the refurbishment interventions launched by mayor Luigi Petroselli. In 1990 the station Pietralata, of the Rome Metro, was inaugurated, and later the Sandro Pertini hospital has been built. In 1998, retrieving some of the funds initially assigned to the Rome Metro, the mayor Francesco Rutelli promoted the creation of a piazza on a plot of land that was previously a landfill. The piazza was initially called Piazza Risarcimento (Compensation Square), then, after the protest of the residents (that wanted it to be dedicated to Pier Paolo Pasolini), the square was officially named Largo di Pietralata.

== Geography ==
The territory of Pietralata includes the urban zones 5G Pietralata and 5C Tiburtino Nord, and a portion of the urban zone 5H Casal de' Pazzi.

=== Boundaries ===
Northward, the quarter border is marked by the river Aniene, that separates Pietralata from Quartiere Monte Sacro (Q. XVI) and from Quartiere Ponte Mammolo (Q. XXIX), up to Via Tiburtina.

Eastward, Pietralata borders with Zona Tor Cervara (Z. VII), whose boundary is outlined by a short stretch of Via Tiburtina, between the river Aniene and Via Palmiro Togliatti.

To the south, the quarter borders with Quartiere Collatino (Q. XXII), from which is separated by Via Tiburtina, up to Via di Portonaccio. Pietralata also shares a short border with Quartiere Tiburtino (Q. VI), marked by the portion of Via Tiburtina between Via di Portonaccio and Via Masaniello.

Westward, the quarter borders with Quartiere Nomentano (Q. V), whose boundary is marked by Via Masaniello, Piazzale della Stazione Tiburtina and Circonvallazione Nomentana, up to the river Aniene.

=== Odonymy ===
The streets of the original core of Pietralata are all named after minerals, while roads and squares in later expansions are dedicated to mineralogists, geologists and paleontologists. There is also a bunch of toponyms related to ancient Roman deities and an area where streets are chiefly named after writers and journalists. The new roads near the Roma Tiburtina railway station are named after prominent politicians. Toponyms of the quarter can be categorized as follows:

- Ancient deities, e.g. Via Aristeo, Via Cupra, Via Feronia, Via Dea Opi, Via Pan, Via Pomona, Via Silvano, Via Vertumno;
- Authors and journalists, e.g. Piazza Baldassarre Avanzini, Via Luigi Barzini senior, Largo Antonio Beltramelli, Via Eugenio Checchi, Via Giuseppe Fava, Via Gabriele Galantara, Via Filippo Meda, Via Mario Pannunzio, Via Emilio Salgari, Via Renato Simoni, Via Giulio Verne;
- Female scientists, e.g. Via Marie Curie, Piazza Maria Goeppert Mayer, Via Rita Levi-Montalcini, Via Lise Meitner, Via Emmy Noether;
- Local names, e.g. Via dell'Acqua Marcia, Via del Casale Rocchi, Via Castel Boverano, Via Castel Paternò, Via dei Monti di Pietralata, Via dei Monti Tiburtini, Via di Pietralata, Via Sassola;
- Minerals, e.g. Via dell'Alabastro, Via dell'Antracite, Via del Carbonio, Via della Lignite, Via della Magnetite, Via del Peperino, Via della Pietra Sanguigna, Via della Torba;
- Mineralogists and geologists, e.g. Via Carlo Amoretti, Via Luigi Bombicci, Via Giovanni Capellini, Via Giuseppe Checchia Rispoli, Via Antonio D'Achiardi, Via Cosimo De Giorgi, Via Achille De Zigno, Via Ramiro Fabiani, Via Gaetano Giorgio Gemmellaro, Via Carlo Perrier, Piazza Federico Sacco, Via Giuseppe Seguenza, Via Matteo Tondi, Via Ferruccio Zambonini;
- Plants and vegetables, e.g. Via degli Aromi, Via dei Cardi, Via dei Cereali, Via degli Ortaggi, Via del Sedano;
- Politicians, e.g. Via Adelaide Aglietta, Via Nino Andreatta, Via Gerardo Chiaromonte, Piazzale Giovanni Spadolini, Via Altiero Spinelli, Rotatoria Benigno Zaccagnini.

== Places of interest ==
=== Civil buildings ===
- Film Studios ex De Paolis, in Via Tiburtina41.908830°N 12.541110°E. The buildings were seized from the Mafia in the 1990s and re-used for social works.

=== Religious buildings ===
- San Michele Arcangelo a Pietralata, in Largo Geltrude Comensoli. 41.917764°N 12.550236°E
- Sant'Atanasio a Via Tiburtina, in Via Achille Benedetti. 41.912479°N 12.543444°E
- San Romano Martire, in Largo Antonio Beltramelli.
- San Fedele da Sigmaringa, in Via Mesula. 41.925715°N 12.534548°E
- Chapel of Madonna delle Grazie, in Via di Vigna Mangani.
- San Vincenzo Pallotti, in Via Matteo Tondi.

=== Military buildings ===
- Forte Pietralata, in Via del Forte di Pietralata. 41.925653°N 12.550356°E It's the headquarter of Granatieri di Sardegna Mechanized Brigade.

=== Schools ===
- Scuola statale materna ed elementare Andrea Torre
- Scuola statale materna ed elementare Vittorio Veneto
- Scuola statale media Pasquale Villari
- Istituto Tecnico Industriale di Stato Antonio Meucci
- Istituto Tecnico Industriale di Stato Joseph-Louis Lagrange

== See also ==
- Metro of Pietralata
- Pietralata's Mass Murder, 23 October 1943
