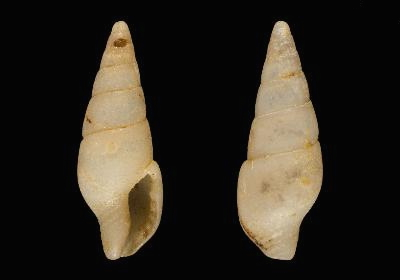
- Shell of Mitrella minor (museum specimen at MNHN, Paris)

Scientific classification
- Kingdom: Animalia
- Phylum: Mollusca
- Class: Gastropoda
- Subclass: Caenogastropoda
- Order: Neogastropoda
- Family: Columbellidae
- Genus: Mitrella
- Species: M. minor

Binomial name
- Mitrella minor (Scacchi, 1836)

Synonyms
- Buccinum minus Philippi, 1844 (unjustified emendation of Columbella minor Scacchi, 1836); Buccinum politum Cantraine, 1835 (invalid: junior homonym of Buccinum politum Lamarck, 1822); Buccinum scacchi Calcara, 1840; Columbella minor Scacchi, 1836; Columbellopsis minor (Scacchi, 1836); Mangelia vitrea Risso, 1826

= Mitrella minor =

Species of gastropod

Mitrella minor is a species of sea snail in the family Columbellidae, the dove snails.
