= Giuseppe Giovanni Antonio Meneghini =

Italian scientist (1811–1889)

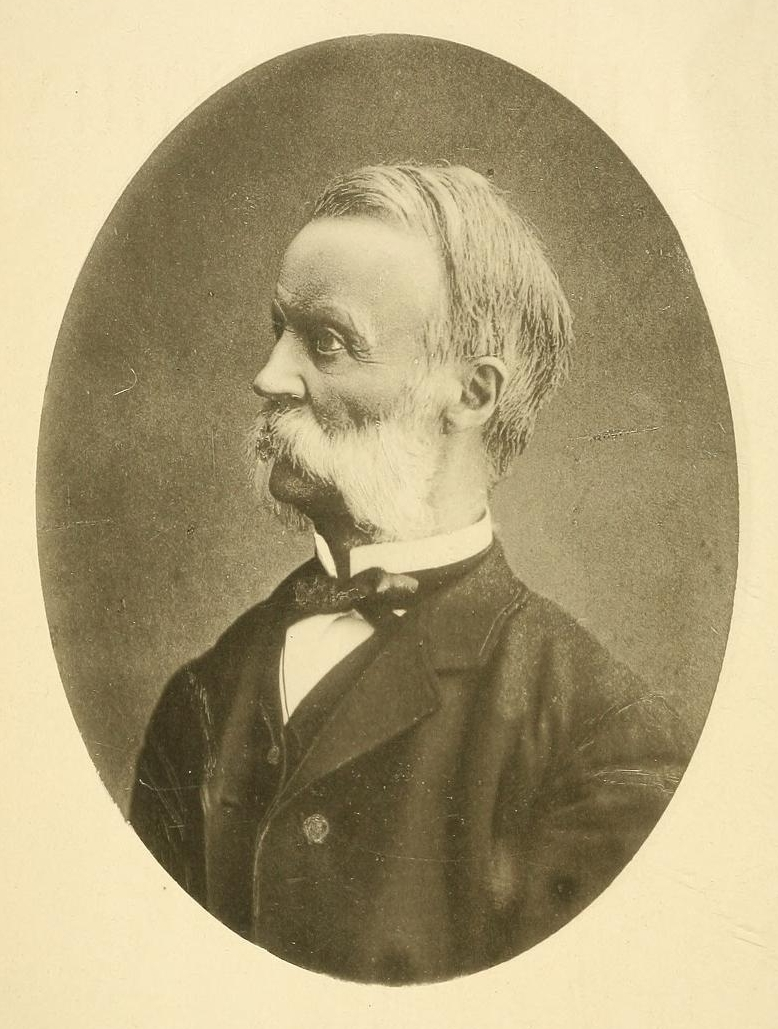

Giuseppe Giovanni Antonio Meneghini (30 July 1811 – 29 January 1889) was an Italian botanist, geologist and paleontologist.

== Biography ==
Meneghini was born in Padua. He became interested in science under his school teacher Pietro Melo. Following school he joined the medical course at the University of Padua in 1829–30 and obtained his medical doctorate in 1834 with a thesis on the cephalo-spinal axis and the following year, he became an assistant to Giuseppe Antonio Bonato, the chair of botany. In 1839 he was appointed professor of preparatory sciences at Padua, a position he maintained up until 1848, when he was removed from his post due to his association with revolutionaries during the First Italian War of Independence, in which he followed the leadership of his brother Andrea. He then went into exile to Bologna followed by Pistoia and then Florence. In 1849 he became a professor of mineralogy and geology at the University of Pisa, where the position had become vacant after the death of Leopoldo Pilla (1805–1848), who was killed in the battle of Curtatone. He then became director of the geological cabinet. In 1874 the chair of mineralogy and geology was split into two entities, with Antonio D'Achiardi (1839–1902) receiving the chair of mineralogy, leaving Meneghini with the chair of geology.

He made contributions in his studies involving the geology of Tuscany, identifying Triassic fossils and worked across Italy and Sardinia, including Cambrian Period trilobites found in Sardinia and ammonites uncovered in Lombardy and the Apennines. He described nearly 560 fossil taxa and was involved in alpine stratigraphy and mapping. He headed the Italian Geological Committee from 1879 until his death.

In 1860 he became a member of the Académie nationale des sciences. In 1874 he was elected founding president of the Societa Toscana di Scienze Naturali, and for a period of time, also served as president of the Italian Geological Society. In 1886, he was named as a senator of the 16th legislature of the Kingdom of Italy. That same year, he was elected as a member to the American Philosophical Society.

Meneghini died in Pisa. The mineral meneghinite is named after him. In 1839 the botanical genus Meneghinia (family Boraginaceae) was named in his honor by Stephan Endlicher. It is now a synonym of Arnebia Forssk.

== Selected works ==
- Ricerche sulle struttura del caule nelle piante monocotiledoni, Padova 1836.
- Alghe italiche e dalmatiche illustrate, 1842-1846
- Sulla teoria dei Meritalli di Gaudichaud, Giornale Botanico Italiano. Firenze1844.
- Sull' animalità delle Diatomee e revisione organografice dei generi di Diatomee stabilità de Kützing, 1846 (translated into English and published in 1853 as "On the animal nature of Diatomeæ : with an organographical revision of the genera, established by Kützing"; referring to German botanist Friedrich Traugott Kützing).
- Osservazioni stratigrafiche e paleontologiche concernenti la geologia della Toscana e dei paesi limitrofi, 1851 (with Paolo Savi).
- Paleontologie de l'ile de Sardaigne, 1857.
- Monographie des fossiles du calcaire rouge ammonitique (lias supérieur) de Lombardie et de l'Appennin central, 1867.
