= Francesco Miglio =

Italian politician (born 1973)

President of the Province of Foggia
- In office 13 October 2014 – 31 October 2018
- Preceded by: Antonio Pepe
- Succeeded by: Nicola Gatta

Mayor of San Severo
- In office 9 June 2014 – 8 June 2024
- Preceded by: Gianfranco Savino
- Succeeded by: Lidya Colangelo

Personal details
- Born: 12 August 1973 (age 53) San Giovanni Rotondo, Apulia, Italy
- Party: Democratic Party
- Occupation: Lawyer

Francesco Miglio (born 12 August 1973) is an Italian politician of the Democratic Party who served as president of the Province of Foggia from 2014 to 2018. He also served as mayor of San Severo from 2014 to 2024.

== Life and career ==
Miglio was born in San Giovanni Rotondo in 1973 and graduated in law before working as a lawyer.

In the 2014 municipal election, he was elected mayor of San Severo for the Democratic Party in a runoff, receiving 11,981 votes (60.6%). He was re-elected in 2019.

In October 2014, Miglio was elected president of the Province of Foggia in the province's first election following the Delrio Law. He was the centre-left candidate and narrowly defeated Franco Landella, mayor of Foggia, receiving 48.48% of the weighted vote against Landella's 48.02%.

In the 2025 regional election, Miglio ran for a seat in the Regional Council of Apulia in the civic list supporting Antonio Decaro in the Foggia constituency. He received 2,235 preference votes, but was not elected to the Regional Council.
