= Dachiardite-K =

Rare zeolite-group mineral

General
- Category: Tectosilicate minerals
- Group: Zeolite group
- Formula: K_{4}(Si_{20}Al_{4}O_{48})·13H_{2}O
- IMA symbol: Dac-K
- Crystal system: Monoclinic; Unknown space group
- Unit cell: a = 18.67, b = 7.51 c = 10.23 [Å], β = 107.79° (approximated)

Identification
- Color: Snow-white
- Crystal habit: Needle-like crystals in spherical aggregates
- Cleavage: (100), perfect
- Fracture: Stepped across
- Tenacity: Brittle
- Mohs scale hardness: 4
- Density: 2.18 (measured), 2.17 (calculated; approximated) [g/cm^{3}]
- Optical properties: Biaxial (+)
- Refractive index: nα=1.48, nβ=1.48, nγ=1.48 (approximated)
- Pleochroism: No
- 2V angle: 65^{o} (measured)
- Dispersion: Distinct

Dachiardite-K is a rare zeolite-group mineral with the formula K_{4}(Si_{20}Al_{4}O_{48})•13H_{2}O. It is the potassium-analogue of dachiardite-Ca and dachiardite-Na, as suggested by the suffix "-K". Dachiardite honors Italian geologist and mineralogist Antonio D'Achiardi. In 1906, his son and mineralogist Giovanni D'Achiardi described and named the mineral dachiardite after he discovered it in a granitic pegmatite.

== Occurrence and association ==
Dachiardite-K was discovered in opal-chalcedony veins in Eastern Rhodopes, Bulgaria. It is associated with barite, calcite, clinoptilolite-Ca, clinoptilolite-K, celadonite, dachiardite-Ca, dachiardite-Na, ferrierite-K, ferrierite-Mg, ferrierite-Na, mordenite, and smectite.
