= Luigi Allegato =

Italian politician (1896–1958)

Member of the Constituent Assembly of Italy
- In office 1946–1948

Member of the Senate of the Republic
- In office 1948–1953

President of the Province of Foggia
- In office June 1952 – 25 May 1958

Personal details
- Born: 8 April 1896 San Severo, Province of Foggia, Kingdom of Italy
- Died: 25 May 1958 (aged 62) San Severo, Province of Foggia, Italy
- Party: Italian Communist Party
- Profession: Farmer

Luigi Allegato (8 April 1896 – 25 May 1958) was an Italian politician and member of the Italian Communist Party. He served as a member of the Constituent Assembly, a senator from 1948 to 1953, mayor of San Severo, and president of the Province of Foggia from 1952 until his death in 1958.
