= Nicola Gatta =

Italian politician (born 1974)

Member of the Regional Council of Apulia
- Incumbent
- Assumed office 23 November 2025

President of the Province of Foggia
- In office 31 October 2018 – 29 January 2023
- Preceded by: Francesco Miglio
- Succeeded by: Giuseppe Nobiletti

Mayor of Candela
- In office 17 May 2011 – 23 October 2025
- Preceded by: Savino Antonio Santarella
- Succeeded by: Giuseppe De Vitto

Personal details
- Born: 24 November 1974 (age 51) Cerignola, Apulia, Italy
- Party: United Christian Democrats; Union of the Centre; Brothers of Italy
- Occupation: Entrepreneur

Nicola Gatta (born 24 November 1974) is an Italian politician serving as a member of the Regional Council of Apulia since 2025. He previously served as president of the Province of Foggia from 2018 to 2023, and mayor of Candela from 2011 to 2025.

== Career ==
Gatta was elected to the municipal council of Candela with the United Christian Democrats, later serving as an assessor and deputy mayor. In 2002, he joined the Union of the Centre. He was elected mayor of Candela in 2011, and was re-elected in 2016 and 2021.

In the 2018 provincial election, Gatta was elected president of the Province of Foggia with 55,745 weighted votes (63%) as the candidate of a centre-right coalition supported by Forza Italia, Lega Nord, Brothers of Italy and centrist parties, defeating Michele Merla, the Democratic Party candidate. In 2023, he sought a second term, but the centre-right coalition entered the election divided: Gatta was supported by Brothers of Italy and Forza Italia, while Lega backed Primiano Di Mauro, mayor of Lesina. Gatta received 41,597 weighted votes (44.5%), losing the election to the centre-left candidate Giuseppe Nobiletti.

In 2024, Gatta joined Brothers of Italy. At the 2025 Apulian regional election, he was elected to the Regional Council of Apulia, receiving 10,273 preference votes and becoming one of the party's two candidates elected in the Foggia constituency.
