= San Severo railway station =

Railway station in Italy

Coordinates: 41.6846°N 15.3922°E

San Severo
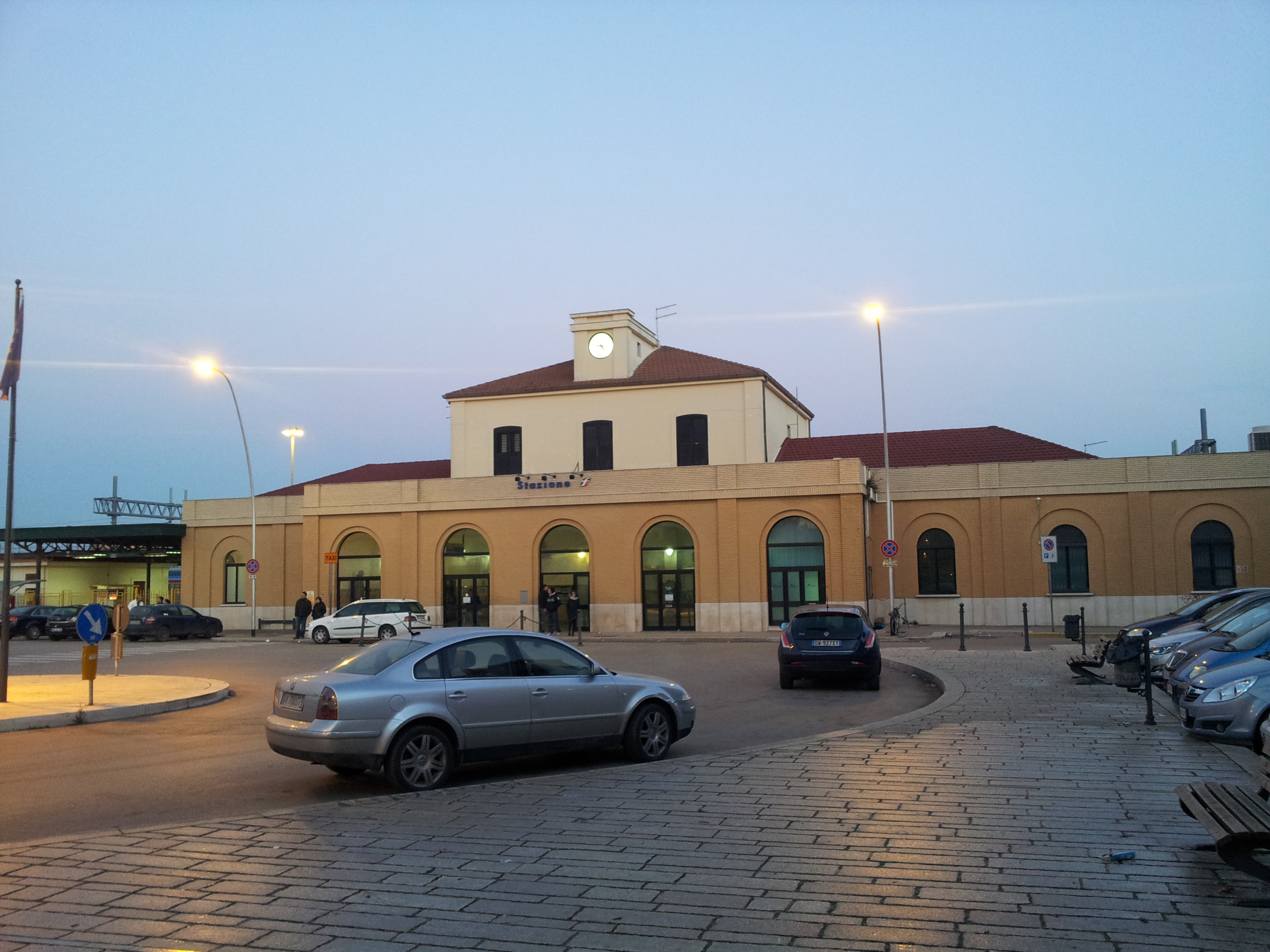

General information
- Location: Piazza della Costituzione; 71016 San Severo; San Severo, Foggia, Apulia; Italy
- Lines: Adriatic railway San Severo-Peschici
- Train operators: Trenitalia
- Connections: Transit buses, extra-urban buses

History
- Opened: 25 April 1864; 162 years ago
- Electrified: 1931
Location
- Location within Apulia Location within Italy

San Severo railway station is an Italian railway station situated in San Severo. It is one of the main railway stations in the province of Foggia.

== Overview ==
The station is served by inter-city trains, local trains and express trains and it is the railway terminus of the line to Peschici.

Even if the station is situated on the outskirts of San Severo, in Piazza della Costituzione (Constitution Square), it is connected to the centre of the town by viale Matteotti (Matteotti Boulevard).

== History ==
The station was officially inaugurated in 1864.

From 1952 to 1962, San Severo railway station has been the terminus of tram line to Torremaggiore.

By the early afternoon of 3 April 1989 a local train coming from Bari Centrale railway station derailed and destroyed the station; 8 people were killed in the crash and 20 people were injured. The names of the victims have been written on a tombstone and a little stone monument has been built to commemorate them.
