= Pietro D'Achiardi =

Italian artist and art critic

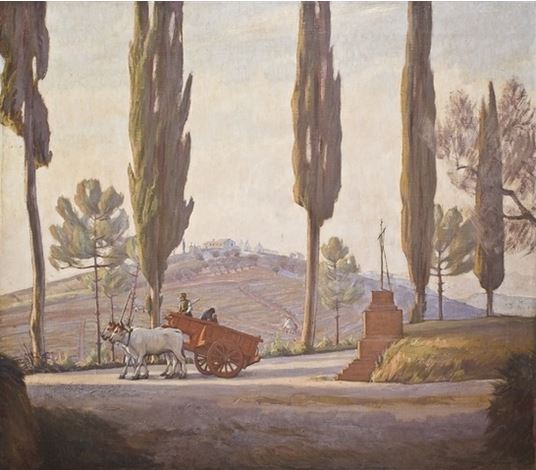
The Red Cart

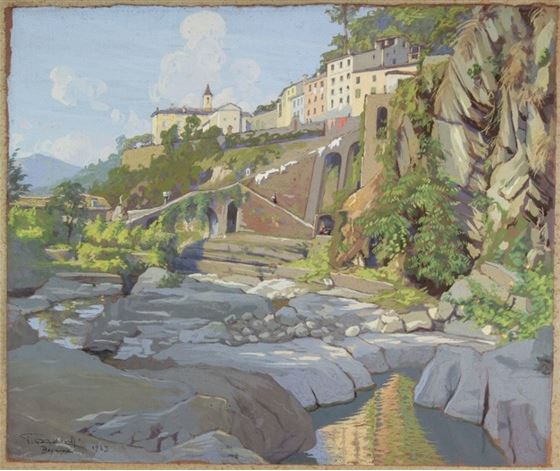
View of Bagnone

Pietro D'Achiardi (28 October 1879, Pisa – 18 December 1940, Rome) was an Italian painter, art historian, art critic, and museum director.

== Biography ==
He was born to the mineralogist, Antonio D'Achiardi and his wife, Marianna, née Camici. His older brother, Giovanni, was also a mineralogist. He was interested in art from a very young age. In 1901, he obtained a degree in literature from the Faculty of Education at the University of Pisa.

He initially painted landscapes and seascapes, using tempera. He moved to Rome in 1903, to attend advanced courses in Medieval and modern art history with Adolfo Venturi. He was awarded his diploma in 1906, for a thesis on Sebastiano del Piombo.

In 1908, as the new Director of the Vatican Galleries, he was commissioned by Pope Pius X to reorganize the layout of the galleries in their new location, near the Vatican Library. He also gathered together paintings from various places within the Vatican City; many inaccessible to the public. The new exhibition was dedicated by the Pope in March, 1909. D'Achiardi wrote guides to the collection in 1913 and 1914.

That same year, he was appointed Inspector at the Galleria Borghese. In 1913, he was named a professor at the Accademia di Belle Arti di Roma. From 1922 to 1924, he worked in Jerusalem, for the Church of All Nations; designing mosaics for several locations, including the Holy Sepulcher. Then, from 1926 to 1929, he worked on private and public commissions in Rome; including some restorative work on mosaics at the Palazzo Venezia. During the last decade of his life, he focused almost entirely on religious art.

His "Way to Heaven" may be seen at the Smithsonian American Art Museum in Washington, DC.

== Sources ==
- Biography from the Dizionario Biografico degli Italiani @ Treccani
- Gianfrancesco Lomonaco, Paolo Emilio Trastulli, Tra 800 e 900 Pietro D'Achiardi: un toscano a Roma, Ed. Dilor, 1984
- Giuseppe Luigi Marini, "Pietro D'Achiardi", inː Il valore dei dipinti italiani dell'Ottocento e del primo novecento, Torino, Umberto Allemandi & C., 2002 ISBN 978-88-422-1051-1
