= Albino Bernardini =

Italian writer and pedagogue (1917–2015)

Albino Bernardini (18 October 1917 – 31 March 2015) was an Italian writer and pedagogue.

Born in Siniscola, Nuoro, Bernardini devoted his life to pedagogy and was the author of dozens of books, mostly fairy tales and children's stories. He was best known for the semi-autobiographical novels Le Bacchette di Lula ("The Lula's chopsticks"), which was translated into 26 languages, and Un anno a Pietralata ("A year in Pietralata"), which was adapted into a film, Diario di un maestro, directed in 1972 by Vittorio De Seta. He also collaborated with several newspapers and magazines.

In 2005 Bernardini received an honorary degree in primary education from Cagliari University.
