= Meneghinite =

General
- Category: Sulfosalt mineral
- Formula: CuPb_{13} Sb_{7}S_{24}
- IMA symbol: Meg
- Strunz classification: 2.HB.05b
- Crystal system: Orthorhombic
- Crystal class: Dipyramidal (mmm); H-M symbol: (2/m 2/m 2/m)
- Space group: Pbnm

Identification
- Color: Blackish lead-grey
- Crystal habit: Prismatic to acicular, massive
- Cleavage: {010} perfect
- Fracture: Conchoidal
- Tenacity: Brittle
- Mohs scale hardness: 2 1/2
- Luster: Metallic
- Streak: Black shining
- Diaphaneity: Opaque
- Specific gravity: 6.36
- Pleochroism: Weak

Meneghinite is a sulfosalt mineral with the chemical formula CuPb_{13} Sb_{7}S_{24}.

In the orthorhombic crystal system, meneghinite has a Mohs hardness of 2 1/2, one perfect cleavage and a conchoidal fracture. It is a blackish lead-grey in colour and gives a black shining streak. Its lustre is metallic.

Discovered in the Italian Province of Lucca in 1852, it is named after Giuseppe Meneghini (1811–1889) of the University of Pisa, who first observed the species. The Bottino Mine in Lucca is the type locality.

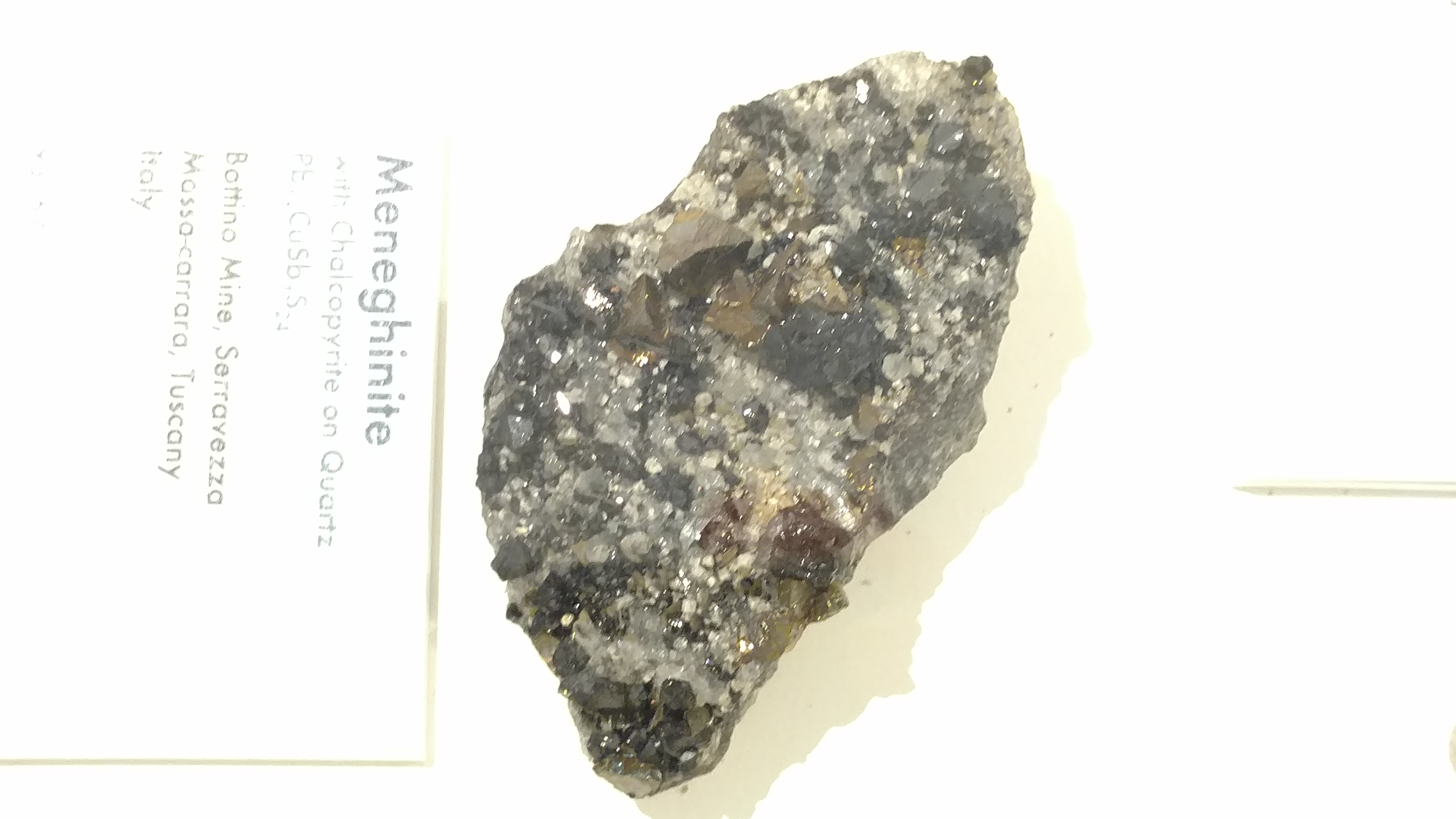
Sample of Meneghinite from the Harvard Museum of Natural History
