= Matteo Tondi =

Italian physician, mineralogist and natural scientist (1762–1835)

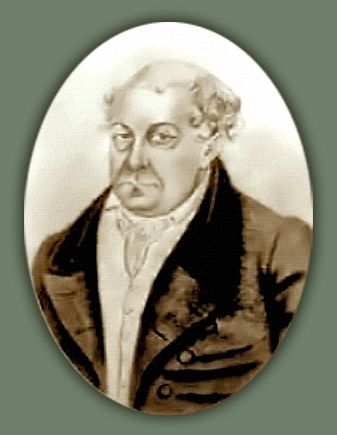

Matteo Tondi (21 September 1762 – 16 November 1835) was an Italian medical doctor, mineralogist and natural scientist. He contributed to studies in chemistry, mineralogy, ideas in geology, mining and metal refining. The mineral Tondiite is named after him.

== Biography ==
Tondi was born on 21 September 1762, in San Severo, to Severino and Eufrasia Cannavino. He studied the classics and went to Naples at the age of seventeen to study medicine. He studied under Domenico Cirillo (1739–799), Domenico Cotugno (1736–822), and Vincenzo Petagna (1730–810). He worked as a private tutor in chemistry and medicine to support his studies. He followed and propagated the ideas of Antoine Lavoisier (1743–794) in chemistry. In 1788, he examined ancient remedies for skin diseases that made use of lizards through a chemical analysis of lizard flesh. When the Austro-Hungarian military sought to reduce imports of materials in 1789, Giuseppe Parisi (1745–831) chose Tondi along with Giovanni Faicchio, Carminantonio Lippi, Giuseppe Melograni, Vincenzo Ramondini and Antonio Savaresi to travel across Europe to study mining and the extraction of mineral resources. In the next few years, Tondi conducted experiments and claimed that he had discovered three new elements that he named as parthenium, austrum, and borbonium. His claims were supported by his supervisor Antal Leopold Ruprecht (1748–814), chemist at the Bergakademie and by Ignaz von Born (1742–791). German and later French scientists expressed their skepticism. The Italian chemist Antonio Savaresi questioned his findings. Tondi claimed that these views were because of political differences, ones that had already arisen during the Europe trip where Savaresi was given special treatment. The compound was likely iron sulphide. Tondi never talked about this "discovery" later in life. Tondi met the geologist Abraham Gottlob Werner and became a Neptunist. In 1794 he travelled around Europe along with Carminantonio Lippi making collections of minerals and returned to Naples in 1796 with a manuscript with the aim of producing an encyclopedia. In 1799, he was caught up in the political upheaval and was exiled to Marseilles. He worked for a while in a coal mine and moved to Paris in 1800 seeking to teach at the École centrale in Blois. He was rejected as a foreigner. He then received support as an assistant to the mineralogist Déodat de Dolomieu (1750–801) at the Muséum national d'histoire naturelle. He worked as an assistant to René Just Haüy from 1806 to 1813. He also gave private courses in mineralogy and his students included Count Giuseppe Marzari Pencati (1779–836) from Vicenza. In 1808, he made a visit to Spain where he escaped an anti-French insurrection and lost crates of collections that he had made. In 1811, he published a list of minerals, Tableau synoptique d'oreognosie ou connaissance des Montagnes ou Roches and later that year he moved back to Naples. He worked as an inspector general of waters and forests from 1812 to 1815. In 1816, he became director of the museum of mineralogy. He published two volumes on minerals in 1817. He introduced Werner's ideas in his teaching and his students included Leopoldo Pilla (1805–848) and Arcangelo Scacchi (1810–893).
