= Leopoldo Pilla =

Italian geologist and physician (1805–1848)

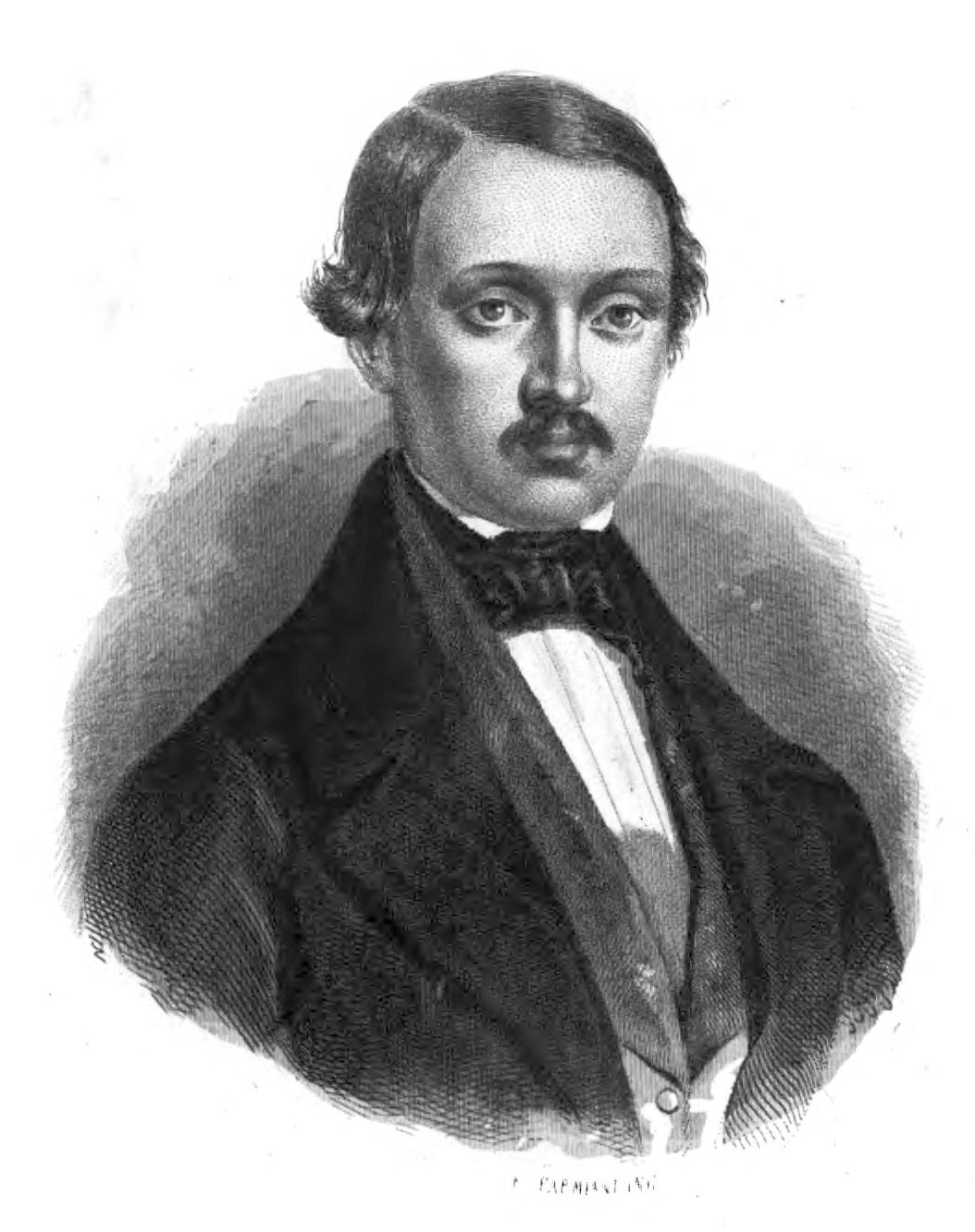
- Born: October 20, 1805; Venafro, Molise
- Died: May 29, 1848 (aged 42); Battle of Curtatone
- Education: University of Naples Federico II
- Occupations: geologist, veterinarian, physician
- Known for: studies on volcanoes
- Notable work: Trattato di Geologia (1847)
- Parents: Nicola Pilla (father); Anna Macchia (mother)

Leopoldo Pilla (20 October 1805 – 29 May 1848) was an Italian geologist, veterinarian, and medical doctor. He contributed to studies on volcanoes. He died in the Risorgimento while leading a student regiment during the Battle of Curtatone.

== Biography ==
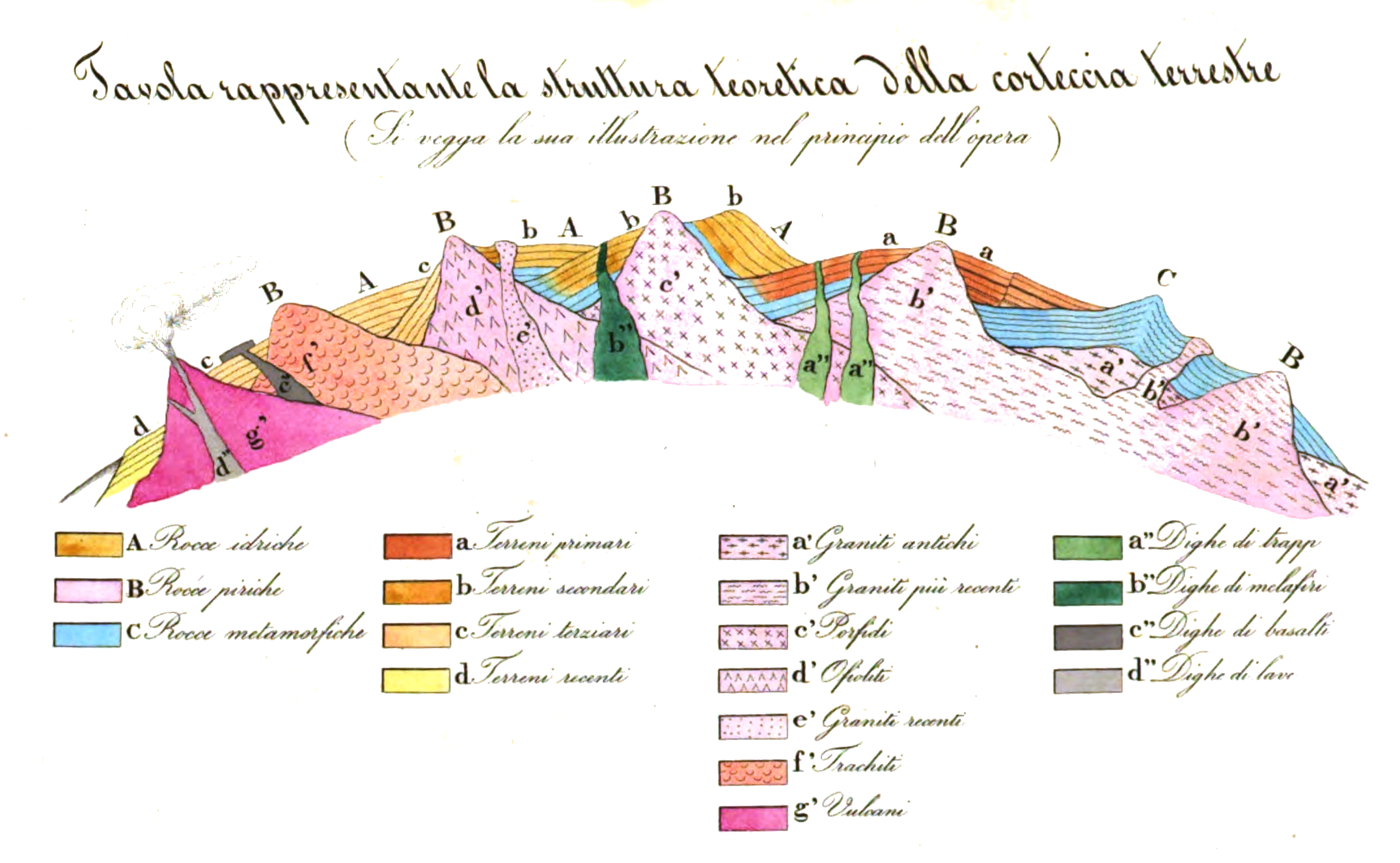
Diagram of the structure of the earth according to Pilla

Pilla was born in Venafro, Molise, to doctor and scholar Nicola and his second wife Anna Macchia. After the death of his mother in 1818, his father married a relative Nicolina Macchia. Pilla did not get along well and the father shifted him to Naples where he lived in the home of his father's friend Nicola Covelli and went to study at the private school of Basilio Puoti before entering the University. In 1821 he joined to study veterinary medicine and qualified in 1825. He then went to study medicine and graduated in 1829. In 1831 he was sent by the Bourbon government to Vienna to study cholera which was threatening Italy. He worked at a military hospital and also took an interest in geology and mineralogy having attended classes under Matteo Tondi. In 1833 he visited the crater of Vesuvius where he was interested to know if volcanoes emitted flammable gases which could burst into flames. In 1841 he was appointed honorary professor in-charge of mineralogy and geology at the University of Naples. He was given no salary and any career advance was blocked by Teodoro Monticelli as he was considered politically unfit, being considered a liberal, his father having been a Jacobin suspected to have been in the Carbonari. In 1842 he became a professor of mineralogy at the University of Pisa and began to correspond with French journals. In 1848 he enlisted as Captain of the Tuscan University Volunteers in the Risorgimento. He moved to Campo delle Grazie near Curtatone where they were in charge of securing a river front. Pilla and the students were killed in the fighting, mowed down by Austrian machine gun fire at Osone bridge. His body was never found.

Pilla maintained notes on his life from 1830 that were later published as Notizie storiche della mia vita quotidiana a cominciare dal 1mo gennaro 1830. He however omitted the fact that he was in love with the daughter of the chemist Filippo Cassola, who however married his classmate Arcangelo Scacchi. He contemplated suicide in 1836. He acknowledged an illegitimate son Leopoldo Nocentini at the time of his death. A plaque marks his home in Venafro, as also a school named in his honour. Although he published in journals and influenced numerous students, Pilla's primary geological output was in his two volume Trattato di Geologia (1847). In his Trattato, he made use of a French translation of Charles Lyell's Elements of Geology, adopting Lyell's terminology. Pilla however did not believe in geological activity being uniform and suggested that the slow cooling of the Earth had reduced the intensity of volcanic eruptions and earthquakes.
