= List of presidents of the Province of Foggia =

President of the Province of Foggia
- Presidente della Provincia di Foggia
- Incumbent; Giuseppe Nobiletti since 29 January 2023
- Term length: 4 years
- Inaugural holder: Giuseppe Civetta
- Formation: 1889

The president of the Province of Foggia is the head of the provincial government in Foggia, Apulia, Italy. The president oversees the administration of the province, coordinates the activities of the municipalities, and represents the province in regional and national matters.

Since January 2023, the office has been held by Giuseppe Nobiletti of the centre-left coalition.

== List ==
=== Presidents of the Provincial Deputation (1889–1927) ===
No.	Portrait	Name	Term of office		Party
No.	Portrait	Name	Start	End	Party
1		Giuseppe Civetta	1889	1893	?
2		Antonio Fiorito	1893	1896	?
3		Michele Dandolo	1896	1903	?
4		Saverio Sinisi	1903	1904	?
(3)		Michele Dandolo	1904	1911	?
(4)		Saverio Sinisi	1911	?	?

=== Presidents of the Province (1952–present) ===
No.	Portrait	Name	Term of office		Party
No.	Portrait	Name	Start	End	Party
1		Luigi Allegato	1952	25 May 1958	Italian Communist Party
		?	?	?	?
		Michele Protano	1981	11 August 1990	Italian Socialist Party
		Armando Palmieri	11 August 1990	21 September 1990	Christian Democracy
		Giulio Miccoli	21 September 1990	22 November 1991	Italian Communist Party
		Teodoro Moretti	22 November 1991	21 February 1994	Italian Socialist Party
–		Michele La Gala (Prefectural commissioner)	19 April 1994	6 July 1994	—
		Antonio Pellegrino	5 December 1994	30 November 1998	Independent (centre-left)
		Antonio Pellegrino	30 November 1998	27 May 2003	Independent (centre-left)
		Carmine Stallone	27 May 2003	29 April 2008	Independent (centre-left)
		Antonio Pepe	29 April 2008	3 May 2013	The People of Freedom
–		Fabio Costantini (Extraordinary commissioner)	3 May 2013	13 October 2014	—
		Francesco Miglio	13 October 2014	31 October 2018	Democratic Party
		Nicola Gatta	31 October 2018	29 January 2023	Union of the Centre
		Giuseppe Nobiletti	29 January 2023	Incumbent	Independent (centre-left)

== Sources ==
- "Storia amministrativa dell'ente". Ministero dell'Interno.
- Menichini, Piera (2005). "I presidenti delle Province dall'Unità alla Grande guerra: repertorio analitico". Storia Amministrazione Costituzione (13): 250–251.
