= Antonio Pepe =

Italian politician (born 1946)

Member of the Chamber of Deputies
- In office 15 April 1994 – 14 March 2013
- Constituency: Apulia

President of the Province of Foggia
- In office 29 April 2008 – 3 May 2013
- Preceded by: Carmine Stallone
- Succeeded by: Francesco Miglio

Personal details
- Born: 10 January 1946 (age 80) Foggia, Kingdom of Italy
- Party: National Alliance (1995–2009); The People of Freedom (2009–2013)
- Occupation: Notary

Antonio Pepe (born 10 January 1946) is an Italian politician and notary. A member of the National Alliance and later The People of Freedom, he served as a deputy from 1994 to 2013 and as president of the Province of Foggia from 2008 to 2013.
