= Giuseppe Nobiletti =

Italian politician (born 1976)

President of the Province of Foggia
- Incumbent
- Assumed office 29 January 2023
- Preceded by: Nicola Gatta

Mayor of Vieste
- Incumbent
- Assumed office 7 June 2016
- Preceded by: Ersilia Nobile

Personal details
- Born: 10 July 1976 (age 50) Vieste, Apulia, Italy
- Occupation: Lawyer

Giuseppe Nobiletti (born 10 July 1976) is an Italian politician serving as president of the Province of Foggia since 2023. He has served as mayor of Vieste since 2016.

In January 2023, Nobiletti was elected president of the Province of Foggia with 44,719 weighted votes, defeating incumbent Nicola Gatta, supported by Brothers of Italy and Forza Italia, and the Lega-backed candidate Primiano Di Mauro. Nobiletti was supported by a centre-left coalition comprising the Democratic Party, the Five Star Movement, the civic lists supporting Apulian president Michele Emiliano, and Article One.

In 2026, Nobiletti became involved in a judicial investigation, together with Vieste's tourism assessor Graziamaria Starace, over the revocation of a beach concession held by Starace's former husband, amid disputes and appeals concerning the municipality's management of beach concessions. Nobiletti denied wrongdoing and said that he would clarify his position in court.
