= San Severo =

San Severo Sanzëvírë (Neapolitan)
- Comune
- Comune di San Severo
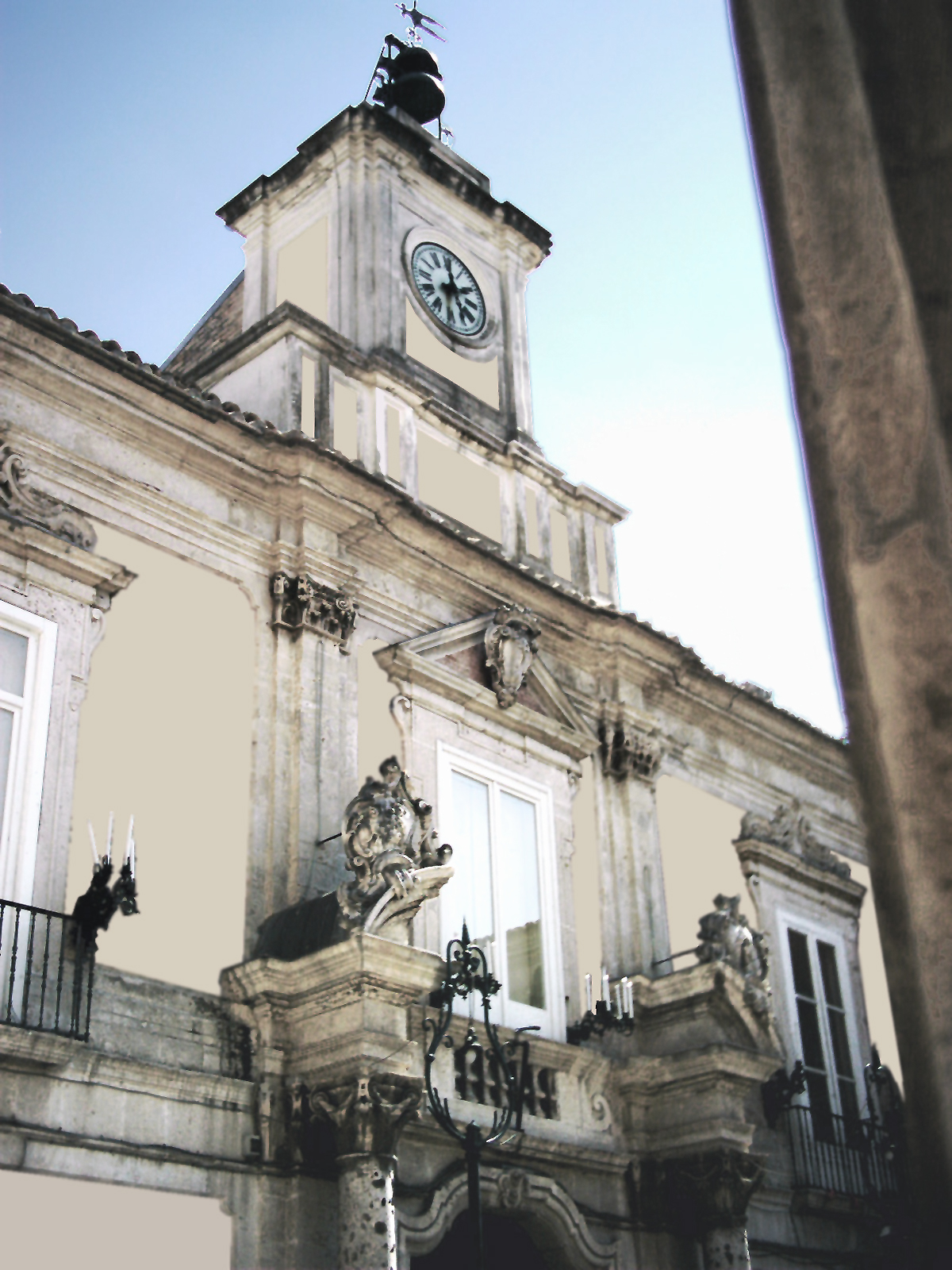
- View of San Severo

- Flag

- San Severo within the Province of Foggia

- Location within Italy Location within Apulia
- Coordinates: 41°41′N 15°23′E
- Country: Italy
- Region: Apulia
- Province: Foggia (FG)

Government
  - Mayor: Lidya Colangelo (Independent (right-wing))

Area
  - Total: 336 km^{2} (130 sq mi)
- Elevation: 90 m (300 ft)

Population (February 2024)
  - Total: 49,075
  - Density: 146/km^{2} (378/sq mi)
- Demonym: Sanseveresi
- Time zone: UTC+1 (CET)
  - Summer (DST): UTC+2 (CEST)
- Postal code: 71016
- Dialing code: 0882
- Patron saint: Saint Severinus Abbot, Saint Severus Bishop, Maria SS. del Soccorso
- Saint day: Third Sunday in May
- Website: Official website

San Severo (pronounced [san seˈvɛːro]; formerly spelled Sansevero and previously known as San Severino; Northern Apulian: Sanzëvírë; Latin: Castellum Sancti Severini) is a comune (municipality) of c. 51,919 inhabitants in the province of Foggia, Apulia, Southern Italy. Rising on the foot of the spur of Gargano, San Severo adjoins the communes of Apricena in the north, Rignano Garganico and San Marco in Lamis in the east, Foggia and Lucera in the south, and Torremaggiore and San Paolo di Civitate in the west.

== Geography ==
=== Territory ===
The city sits in low-lying country, its center being at about 90 metres (300 ft) above sea level. Geologically, its soil is quaternary (with sand and clay, fossils, and marine in origin). Its territory decreases in elevation from the west 125 metres (410 ft) to the east 26 metres (85 ft), gradually changing from minor ripples in the western hills to a more regular plain in the east at the Candelaro basin.

In addition to the Candelaro river, other waterways include the Triolo and Salsola torrents and Radicosa, Venola, Ferrante, Santa Maria and Potes channels. The scarcity of rain in the summer causes the groundwater to become brackish, especially in the subsoil of the city. The lands surrounding the city are studded with farms, characterized primarily by ordered groves and vineyards, as well as fields of wheat.

=== Climate ===
The climate is Mediterranean, with relatively mild winters (snow is rare) and very hot summers. High wind gusts are quite common.

- Climate classification: Zone D, GR-G 1494.

== History ==
=== Origins ===
According to legend, a city called Castrum Drionis (Casteldrione) was founded by the Greek king Diomedes. San Severo is said to be one of the last towns in Italy to remain pagan, and only in 536 did Saint Laurence of Siponto, bishop of Siponto, convert the town's inhabitants to Christianity. He also required that the village be renamed after governor Severus.

San Severo lies in the Daunia, and various Neolithic settlements have been detected. In the early Middle Ages, the area was not inhabited or defined. Between the Lombards and the Byzantine ages, the Benedictine monastery at Cassino was established, and with it, the cult of the apostle of Saint Severinus of Noricum. San Severo was founded in the 11th century around a small church built by the Benedictine monks from Montecassino. It rapidly developed as a trade town. In 1053, it was the scene of the historical victory of Robert Guiscard over the papal troops under Pope Leo IX (see Battle of Civitate). In the eleventh century, San Severo was the route of the Via Sacra Langobardorum and a primitive church arose dedicated to Saint Severinus, from which continued an influx of pilgrims to Monte Sant'Angelo and movement of people and goods. The town was therefore called Castellum Sancti Severini ("Fortified Town of Saint Severinus").

The conurbation developed rapidly due to its favorable position for trade, and soon took on considerable importance; it became the seat of Venetian, Florentine, Saracens and Jewish merchants. Subject to the abbots of the Benedictine monastery of San Pietro di Torremaggiore (in 1116 the abbot gave the famous Adenulfo Libertatis Charta), in 1230, the city rebelled against Frederick II of Hohenstaufen who ceded it to the Knights Templar.

=== Medieval ===
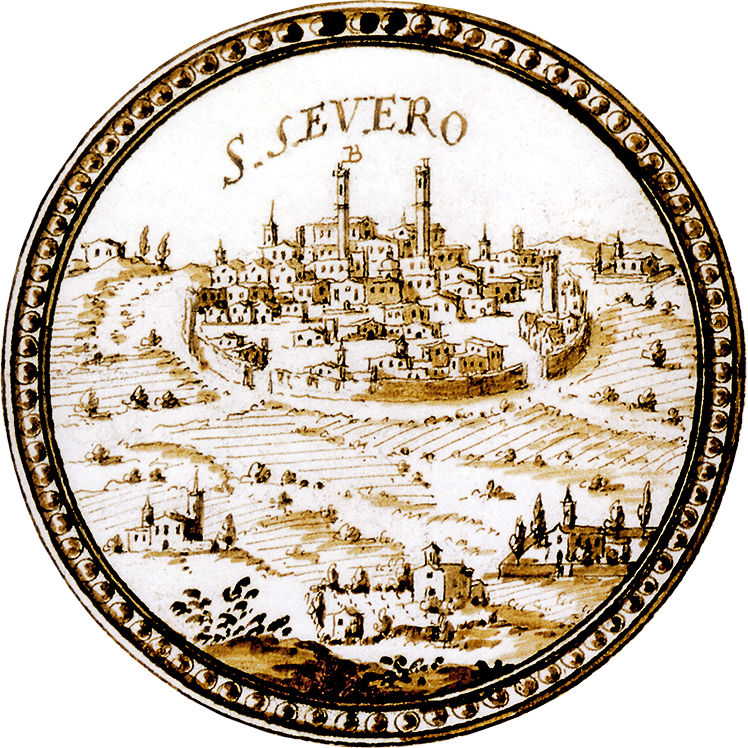
Medieval drawing of San Severo.

After the suppression of the Templars, by 1312, the city was refortified with a wall, and ceded to Robert d'Anjou and his wife Sancha. In 1317, Sancha sold it to Count Peter Pippin, Lord of Vico. The resistance of the citizens denied him the possession of his acquisition, and resistance only stopped when they gained some degree of independence under the royal authority of Naples. San Severo was then declared a royal city in perpetuity.

It became the capital of Giustizierato (province) of Capitanata, whose jurisdiction also included Molise. The city was the seat of provincial officials and the court of the Royal Audience. After Queen Joan I of Naples stayed there, many Neapolitan monarchs followed in her presence, including Alfonso I of Aragon and Ferdinand I of Naples. In the fifteenth century, the city also minted its own coins.

=== From Renaissance to Principality ===
In 1521, Charles V sold the city to the Duke of Termoli, Ferdinand of Capua, but Mayor Tiberio Solis was able to redeem it by paying 42,000 ducats to the Emperor by collecting contributions from private citizens. The king then granted the city of San Severo the perpetual right to self-government. According to tradition, in January 1536, Charles V also ennobled twenty-four local families, establishing the town's oligarchic regime.

San Severo became the most populous city in Capitanata in the 16th century. The rich commerce, cultural vitality and self-government made it one of the major centers of the south, due to the presence of a large Venetian warehouse. Directly connected to the Fortore river was an important link between the Venetians and the Kingdom of Naples. Leandro Alberti (1550) writes of San Severo "this castle is very rich, noble, civilized and filled with people, and is so wealthy that he envied any other in this region." The town also established ecclesiastical organizations, with four wealthy parishes, several hospitals, some religious confraternities and nine religious institutes.

=== The Age of the Principality ===
In 1579, at the height of its prestige but suffocated in debt, the city was sold to Duke Gian Francesco di Sangro, who won for his heirs the title of Prince of Sansevero. Consequently, it lost its rank as capital, which passed to Lucera, and the governor of the province and the court was transferred.

Accustomed to self-government, the citizens chafed under the tyranny of their new feudal lords. Many families of the old Sanseveresi aristocracy immediately chose to leave the city and those who remained watched helplessly as the era known as the "Regime of Forty" unfolded.

This was an era of decline for the city, despite the promotion of the city to Episcopal seat in 1580. On July 30, 1627, a catastrophic earthquake almost razed the town to the ground and killed eight hundred inhabitants and an unspecified number of foreigners. Reconstruction was slow, and hindered by the plague epidemic of 1656 and 1657 (during which nearly three thousand people died). In the eighteenth century, the city was rebuilt with a markedly Baroque appearance. On April 16, 1797, Ferdinand IV visited San Severo and there he reviewed the Regina regiment. On April 25, Prince Francis I of the Two Sicilies and Queen Maria Carolina, came there to visit and attended a solemn mass in the cathedral. In February 1799, following a fierce reaction to the proclamation of the Jacobin republic, French troops, commanded by Generals Guillaume Philibert Duhesme and La Foret plundered the city with terrible violence. The victims, between citizens and soldiers, were about four hundred and fifty.

=== 19th Century ===
Feudalism was abolished in 1806 and San Severo was the sixth largest city of the kingdom by number of inhabitants. It became the capital of one of the three districts and then sub-prefecture. In 1819, the ancient palace Decurionate inaugurated in the Teatro Real de Bourbon, the first Italian district and one of the first in the south. After the French occupation, the city became a key stronghold of the Carbonari, so that Giuseppe Mazzini long dreamed of making San Severo the starting point of the riots of 1820. In 1826, the monumental cemetery was opened. On May 18, 1847, Ferdinand II of the Two Sicilies visited the city. The large public gardens were dedicated in 1854, while in 1858, there was the dedication of the Ferdinandea Civic Library.

In 1860, San Severo contributed many young people to increase the ranks of the anti Bourbon-militias, when Francis II was still on the throne, and was among the first cities to proclaim allegiance to the Kingdom of Italy and to hoist the tricolor Flag of Italy. On October 21 the same year, the Sanseveresi voted unanimously for a united Italy. From 1862 to 1864, during the riots, the city was the seat of the 49th Regiment unit, who distinguished itself in the suppression. After the unit built the railway station in 1863, and created the high school and technical schools in 1864, they also started two major bands, the "White" in 1879 and "Red" in 1883, who obtained several international awards.

=== Modern ===
On April 29, 1923, the Crown Prince Umberto I of Italy visited the city and inaugurated the school building "Principe di Piemonte". In 1929, the municipal sports field was inaugurated. On October 27, 1931, the Minister of Communications, Costanzo Ciano, dedicated the Ferrovie del Gargano, linking the station of San Severo to a number of places on the Gargano-Peschici line. On December 9, 1937, the curtain of the new Municipal theater was opened for the first time.

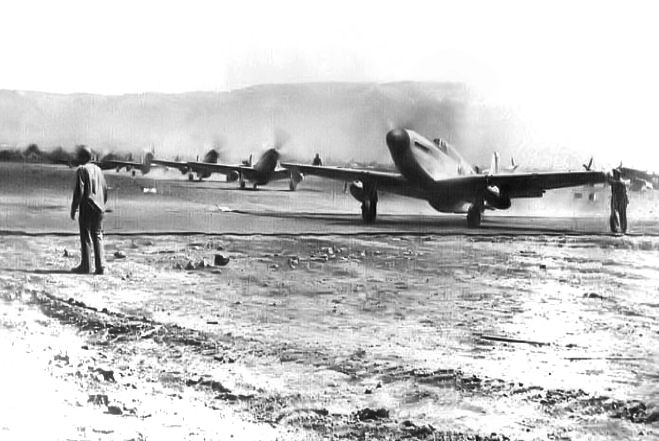
The San Severo Airfield in World War II

During the Second World War, on September 9, 1943, a group of Italian soldiers were involved in an episode of resistance, refusing to surrender to the Germans. By September 28, the Germans blew up the telephone exchange, the Casillo mill and several bridges, including that of the railway. During World War II, San Severo was the home of a US Airfield for the Fifteenth Air Force. P-51 fighters of the 31st Fighter Brigade lead armed escorts and support operations from San Severo on April 2, 1944 to March 3, 1945.

On March 23, 1950, San Severo workers rioted against police, raising barricades and storming the armory and the headquarters of the Italian Social Movement. The clashes caused one death and wounded forty civilians and soldiers and army tanks occupied the main streets of the city. In the following days, an armed insurrection was raised against the powers of the state; people were arrested, acquitted, and a year later released after the trial. Pope John Paul II visited the city on May 25, 1987. In 1996, by special decree, the President of the Republic, Oscar Luigi Scalfaro, confirmed for San Severo the title of city, historically acquired in 1580, and the establishment of the Sanseveresi diocese. In 1999, at the Italian Chamber of Deputies and the Senate, San Severo was presented two bills (respectively 6472 and 4370) for the establishment of the province of San Severo, comprising 22 municipalities in Tavoliere delle Puglie north of Gargano and Subappennino Dauno. Between October 31 and November 2, 2002, a violent earthquake, known as the Molise earthquake, damaged many buildings in the old village and caused the closure of some of its historic churches.

South of San Severo emerged a slum area consisting mainly of Subsaharan irregular immigrants who work in agriculture in the region.

== Miracle of San Severino ==
According to legend, the apparition of St Severino has appeared to the relief of his city on two occasions. In 1522, along with the apparition of St Sebastian, he appeared to warn about a looming army of mercenaries. Six years later, his apparition is credited with driving away the imperial army. During the War of Lautrec, San Severo was besieged and seized by the French general, who then promptly died. The town now feared retribution by the imperial army, who were at the walls. In order to avoid a long siege, the imperial soldiers feigned a withdrawal, intending to storm the town by surprise the next night. Legend holds that when the imperial troops returned the next night, before the walls of San Severo, they came upon a huge army under the command of a knight holding a bright sword in his right hand and a red flag in his left, and fled in fear. The next morning some people, unaware of the miracle, found some of the imperials asleep near the monastery of San Bernardino. The soldiers told the events of the night before, and the people agreed that their patron saint, San Severino, had personally defended them. The people then found that the altar cloth in the church had large hoofprints, a sign of their saintly defenders.

On his feast day, each year, the town donates a hundred pounds of wax to the patron saint, proclaimed Defensor Patriae. From thence, the town's civic emblem is San Severino riding with a red flag in his right hand.

== Etymology ==
The city derives its name from the patron saint San Severino, the owner of the church around which the castellum was formed. The original "Sanctus Severinus" appeared in seven papers written between 1116 and 1266. "Sanctus Severus", however, is first attested in a document dated 1134, also known only in dubious modern transcription. In some documents, the header is read in Latin with the original spelling and the one derived in the text in the vernacular; this suggests that the change is due to ancient agiotoponimo syncope, withdrawal common in the transition from Latin to Italian: Sanctus Severinus> Sanseverinus> Sansevero, especially since no saint named Severus was revered in the city before the end of the seventeenth century. Uncoincidentally, the official name "Sansevero" - acknowledging the uncommon variants San Severo and S. Severo - was always in the univerbata form.

In 1931 the municipality, at the request of the Ministry of Interior, officially adopted the spelling "San Severo", having been taken from the dictionary compiled by the United Town's Central Institute of Statistics (The situation is analogous to that of Sanremo). The change of the name was accepted with little to no resistance, so that today it is used almost universally. An exception is made by Trenitalia and the Autostrade, which represents the city by writing "S. Severe".

== Main sights ==
On February 2, 2006, the town received recognition as an art city. The center retains its medieval labyrinthine street grids, and was once delimited by a perimeter wall punctuated by seven gates. The medieval town suffered from the earthquake of July 30, 1627. It is rich in Baroque palaces (including those of de Petris, del Sordo, de Lucretiis, Fraccacreta, Mascia, Recca, de Ambrosio, Pozzo, and Summantico). It had a number of monasteries, including three Benedictine monasteries (now the seat of the Court), a Celestine monastery (which became the town hall in 1813) and a Franciscans monastery (now the seat of the Municipal Library and Museum).

At the center of the town is the Romanesque church of San Severino, dedicated to the patron of the city. The cathedral, dedicated to Santa Maria Assunta, has undergone many reconstructions. The interior has a 12th-century baptismal font and paintings by eighteenth-century painters such as D'Elia, Primavera, and Solimena). The Church of San Giovanni Battista has paintings by Nicola Menzel. The cupola of the church of Santa Maria del Carmine was frescoed by Mario Borgoni.

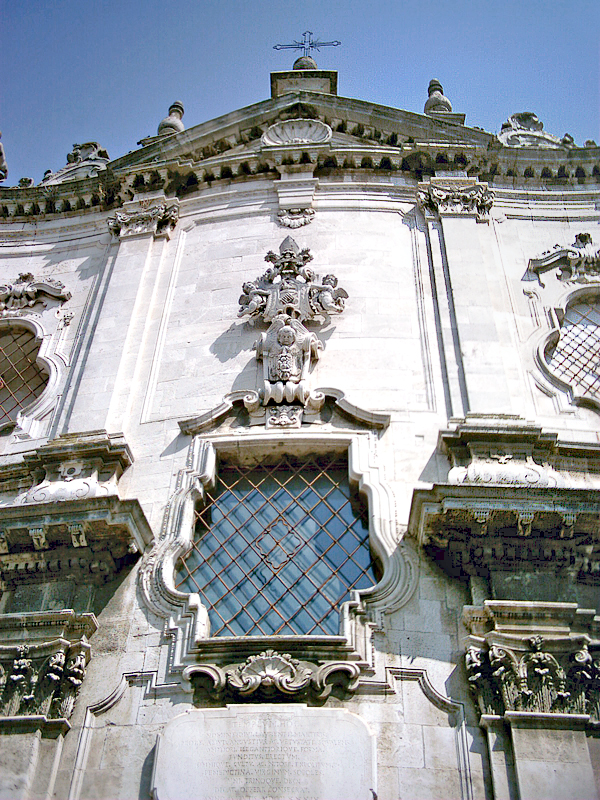
San Lorenzo's Church.

The Teatro Comunale, dedicated to Verdi, is the largest theater building in Capitanata, premiered in 1937. It has a large public garden with century old avenues that converge on an artificial mound called Montagnella, and a platform with bronze statues and a large round stage for concerts. A number of small monuments are dispersed throughout the flower beds, including the marble bust (1837) of Matteo Tondi by Tito Angelini.

After the earthquake of 1627 and the gradual removal of walls, the town expanded with the creation of new districts. To contain the damage caused by frequent earthquakes, most of the buildings do not exceed two floors (and often were reduced to low ground floors and whitewashed gable roofs). The expansion of the city continued into the late nineteenth and early twentieth century.

== Dialect ==
Because of its geographic location, San Severo has had direct contact for centuries with the dialects of Gargano, northern Apulia, Molise, and Campania. As a result, the Sanseverese dialect is overall very close to that of Naples. Among the various dialects of Apulia, it differs somewhat from that of nearby Foggia and has little relationship with that of the city of Bari. As an example, the sentence, "The dog bites the bottom," in standard Italian would be "Il cane morde lo straccione," whereas in Sanseverese it would be "U chen mòccëchë 'u straccet," and in the Foggian dialect it would be "U chen muccichèjë 'u stracce."

== San Severo DOC ==
The Italian wine DOC around San Severo produces red, white and rose wines, as well as the occasional sparkling spumante. Grapes are limited to a harvest yield of 14 tonnes/ha throughout the 2,000 ha (5000 acre) production zone. The red and rose wines are made from 70-100% Montepulciano with Sangiovese permitted by up to 30%. The white and spumante wines are produced with 40-60% Bombino bianco, 40-60% Trebbiano and up to 20% Verdeca.

== Events ==
=== Patronal feast ===
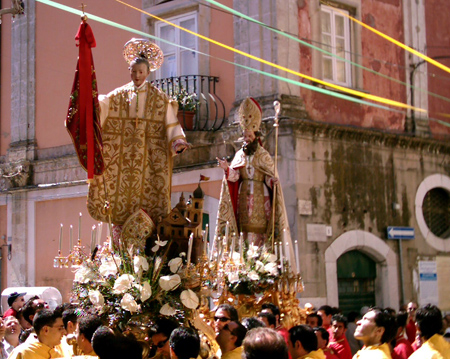
Procession of the Saints in San Severo

San Severo is famous for its yearly festival held on the third Sunday of May. Called "La Festa del Soccorso" (The Festival of Help/Aid), it is held in honor of the patron saints of San Severo, "La Madonna del Soccorso" (The Madonna of Help/Aid), Saint Severinus Abbot, and Saint Severus Bishop. During this festival, San Severo features nighttime and daytime fireworks in order to celebrate the Madonna; the daytime fireworks are a major attraction. Extremely loud firecracker chains are placed along the city streets. In many cases they extend for kilometers. A common practice is for young males to run along the firecrackers as they explode down the street (an analogue tradition, called "Correfoc", exists in Spain). These people are called "fuejentes" (people who enjoy running through the fireworks). For this reason San Severo is called "the city of fireworks".

=== Rituals for Good Friday ===
Among the many traditions are the rites of the Holy Week. At dawn on Good Friday, a procession starts simultaneously from the three churches. From the Church of the Pieta, the procession carries the eighteenth-century statue of Our Lady of Sorrows (confraternity of prayer and death); from the Trinity Church, the procession carries a wooden effigy of Christ bound to the column (Arch-confraternity of the rosary), and from the Church of St. Augustine a procession of hooded penitents carries the heavy cross of Simon of Cyrene on their shoulders (confraternity of help). The three sacred processions converge in the ancient Piazza del Castello, where the statues proceed towards each other, but the embrace of the Mother and the Son is blocked by the Cross, which arises suddenly between them.

=== Other religious holidays ===
Other festivals with processions include the Lady of Mount Carmel festival (July 16), San Rocco (August 16) and the Madonna del Rosario (the third Sunday in October), as well as the recurrence of Concetta, namely the Immaculate Conception (December 8). There are also the feasts of St. Lucy (December 13) and Saint Anthony Abbot (January 17), the latter with the historic blessing of the animals. The patron saints are, respectively, Severino and Severo, and are celebrated on September 25 and the Saturday before the fourth Sunday in October. Moreover, the solemn ceremony of the vote in San Severino is celebrated annually on January 8 by the Municipal Administration, during which it remembers the apparition of the patron saint.

=== Carnival ===
During the time of the annual carnival, it is customary to prepare awkward puppets that are arranged in comical sitting positions on small chairs by the doors of houses. On Shrove Tuesday, at dusk, the people celebrate the colorful "funeral" of the puppets, which ends with the burning of the puppets, which are sometimes stuffed with firecrackers. The city does not seem to have a real typical mask, however, a more widespread traditional outfit requires that men wear flashy clothes.

=== Wine festival ===
In recent years, the old Grape Festival celebrates one of the main products of the Sanseveresi, during the Feast of St. Martin, (or Festival of New Wine) which is held in the historic heart of the city for several days around November 11, with exhibition of local products, wine tasting and local cuisine and various cultural performances (concerts, exhibitions, folklore shows, etc.).

== Culture ==
=== Museums, libraries and archives ===
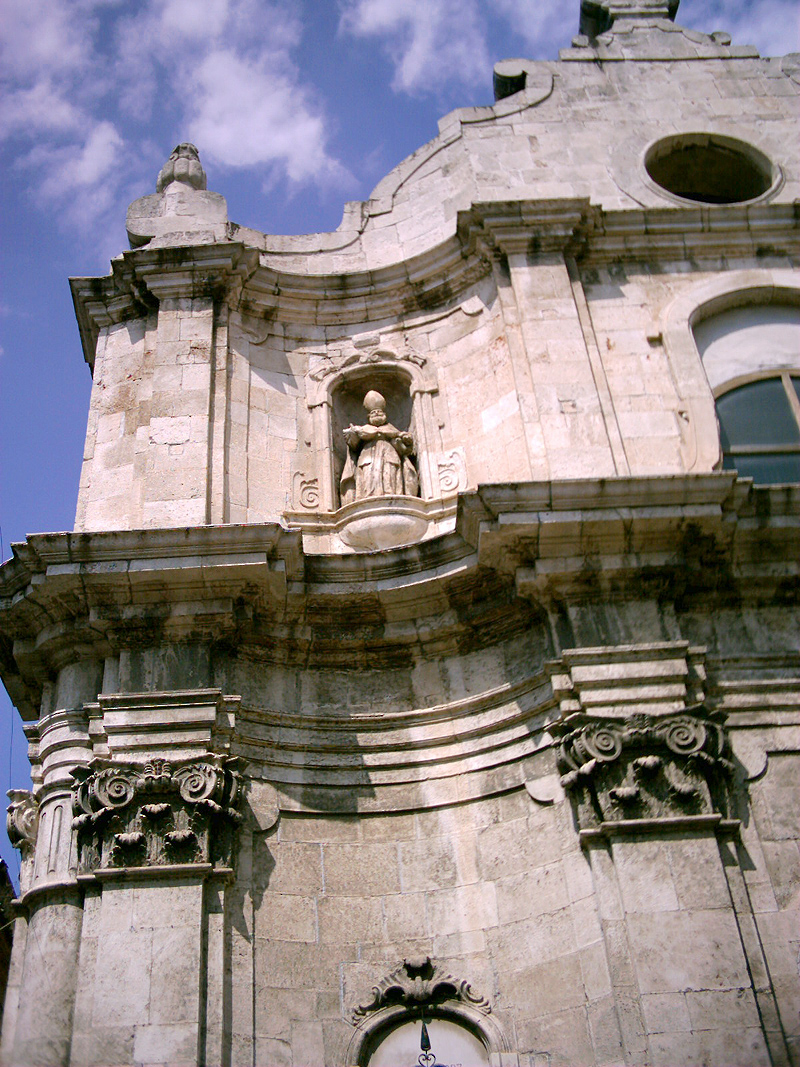
Saint Augustine's Church

The preservation and promotion of artistic heritage, the city's books, and periodicals are the raison d'être of a number of important public and private institutions that promote the cultural development of San Severo and its surroundings.

- The Museum of the Tavoliere (MAT) is set in an eighteenth-century Franciscan monastery, also known as Palazzo San Francesco. It retains a considerable archaeological heritage, with exhibits from the Paleolithic to the Middle Ages, and a gallery with works of the modern age.
  - Pinacoteca "Luigi Schingo" is a section of MAT, with headquarters in Palazzo San Francesco; it holds some works of the Sanseveresi artist Louis Schingo.
  - The community library "Alexander Minutia" is now located temporarily in the Palazzo San Francesco. The historic institution, originally called Ferdinandea, boasts a heritage of over ninety thousand volumes of books and a prestigious background of ancient writings, as well as many rare incunabula.
- The Diocesan Museum contains sacred art, housed in the basement of the Palazzo del Seminario, with silver, vestments, and works of different eras. Among the most significant artifacts are a collection of medieval collection plates embossed with copper, and some medieval and Renaissance polychrome wooden statues.
- A permanent display of carriages and finishes of the eighteenth century was built in 2007 on Viale Matteotti. It is part of the cultural initiatives promoted by the banking group BancApulia.
- The "Father Benedetto Nardella" of Friars Minor Capuchin Library, housed in the seventeenth-century convent of Santa Maria of Constantinople, holds twenty thousand volumes on mysticism, spirituality, St. Pio of Pietrelcina, and patriotic history.
- The "Felice Chirò" economic-legal Library, made from BancApulia Gramsci, holds over fifty thousand texts and journals used frequently by students and scholars.
- Historical Archives: The Municipal Library, contains a vast collection of documents on civil and administrative life of the city in modern and contemporary art.
- Archival diocesan Trotta is housed in the Palace, near the Cathedral, and boasts a rich documentary of heritage, conservation, and a significant number of parchments and episcopal archives.
- The Music Fund of the Benedictine monastery of San Lorenzo includes autographs of important Italian composers of the eighteenth century.

Exhibitions of various kinds (archeology, painting, photography etc.) are more or less regularly staged at the Museum, the Diocesan Museum and the Gallery of Modern Art in Palazzo San Lorenzo.

=== Theater and music ===
The city is home to three public theaters: the Decurionate (1750 ca.), the Real Bourbon (1819), and the Teatro Verdi (designed by Cesare Bazzani in 1937). Throughout each year, alongside a full season of concerts curated by the Friends of Music, performances such as Verdi operas, a series of shows of prose (in collaboration with the consortium Teatro Pubblico Pugliese) and evenings at the ballet are featured. Concerts of sacred music are held regularly in the churches of the historic center. The iconic Cantina D'Araprì features many music performances, including jazz shows.

== Education ==
=== University ===
San Severo's University of Foggia has active courses in nursing, business, viticulture and enology (the science and technology of winemaking). At the former "Pascoli" school building a citadel that will host economics courses is under construction; these courses are currently held temporarily in the Istituto commercial Fraccacreta Angel, while courses on agriculture will be held at the Michele di Sangro Agricultural Institute.

=== Public schools ===
There are five primary schools, four middle schools, and eight high schools (the Gymnasium High School, Liceo Scientifico, Istituto Tecnico Agrario, Commercial Technical Institute, Institute Industrial Technical Professional Institute, Institute for Teaching and Technical Institute for Surveyors).

== Media ==
The city has several different local newspapers (Il Corriere di San Severo, San Severo Il Giornale, La Gazzetta di San Severo, and the bell tower), and the broadcaster Tele Radio San Severo, which produces Sansevero television and radio broadcastings.

== People ==
=== Letters and Science ===
- Joseph Annese (1932–1979), writer and poet
- Mario Carli (1888–1935), writer and poet
- Nino Casiglio (1921–1995), writer
- Joseph Rispoli Checchia (1877–1947), geologist and paleontologist
- Augustine Colombrita (1500 ca.), zoologist
- Michele (Michael) DiCesare (born 1965), Police Officer
- Gaetano de Lucretiis (1745–1817), scientist
- Angelo Fraccacreta (1882–1951), economist
- Matthew Fraccacreta (1772–1857), historian
- Umberto Fraccacreta (1892–1947), poet
- Alessandro Minuziano (1450 ca.-1532), publisher and printer
- Vincenzo Pirro (1938-2009), historical
- Gualberto Titta (1906–1999), writer and actor
- Matteo Tondi (1762–1835), mineralogist
- Michele Zannotti, mathematician

=== Artists ===
- Matteo Germano (1937–2004), sculptor
- Andrea Pazienza (1956–1988), cartoonist and painter
- Salvatore Postiglione (1905–1996), sculptor
- Luigi Schingo (1891–1976), painter and sculptor
- Gianluigi Tosto (born 1964), actor

=== Politicians ===
- Luigi Allegato (1896–1958), trade unionist, senator and founding father
- Umberto Delle Fave (1912–1986), deputy and senator, minister, president of RAI
- Mario Fasino (1920–2017), former president of the Sicilian Region
- Raffaele Recca (1900–1954), lawyer and founding father
- Pasquale Iantoschi, mayor of the City (from 1962 to 1967)

=== Musicians and singers ===
- Luigi Capotorti, composer and maestro di cappella (1767–1842), who spent his final years in San Severo and died there in 1842
- Franco Cassano (born 1922), musician
- del Re Ferdinand (1839–1887), composer and band director
- Rosanna Fratello, pop singer (1950)
- Dante Morlino (1909-1978), composer
- Luca Sardella (born 1956), pop singer and television presenter
- Matteo Sassano (1667–1737), opera singer
- Jacopo Sol (born 2002), singer-songwriter

=== Sports ===
- Luigi Castiglione (born 1967), boxer
- Carmen Fiano (born 1968), ultramarathoner
- Walter Magnifico (born 1961), basketball player
- Michele Pazienza (born 1982), soccer player
- Alessandro Potenza (born 1984), basketball player

=== Bishops ===
- Anthony, Bishop of Lucera in the fourteenth century
- Sparano, Bishop of Venafro from 1306 to 1326
- Giacomo Bruno, Bishop of Dragonara in the sixteenth century
- Germanico Malaspina, Nuncio and Bishop of San Severo from 1583 to 1603
- Francesco Antonio Sacchetti, Bishop of San Severo in 1635, and of Troy after 1650
- Francesco Antonio Giannone, Bishop of Boiano from 1685 to 1707
- Carlo de Ambrosio, Bishop of Larino from 1775 to 1785

== Economy ==
=== Agriculture and typical products ===
San Severo is at the forefront in the world for the production and marketing of wine, but also produces large quantities of high quality grain, grapes, and olives. Large agricultural resources have generated a lively system of small and medium-sized industrial products grown and exported to international markets. In 1968 the Sanseveresi wine became the first in Apulia to obtain the Designation of Origin Control. The varieties are white San Severo, San Severo sparkling white, red, and Rosé San Severo.

San Severo is also noted for its production of Peranzana (Dauno) olives, which have received the Protected Designation of Origin designation (PDO). The Vase Sanseveresi is a centuries-old traditional method of pruning olive trees like inverted cones, with the focus on horizontal rather than height-based arrangement.

== Transport ==
San Severo railway station is a relatively important station of the Adriatic railway, and is the western terminus of the San Severo–Peschici line.

The town is served by the A14 motorway Bologna-Taranto at the homonymous exit, and is crossed by the national highways SS16, SS89 and SS272.

== Sports ==
San Severo is home to several different sports teams.

There are two basketball teams, currently active and playing on the parquet floor of Palasport "Falcone e Borsellino" (4000 seats). The Basketball Association, founded in 1966, boasts a notable list of players of the past, including the pivot Walter Magnifico. Its colors are yellow and black, but for fans of the team the standard color is simply black. The team plays in the Lega A2 event in 2010/2011. Another amateur club is the San Severo Marvin School club.

There are three city soccer teams. The historic U.S.D. San Severo, founded in 1922 (colors: yellow-grenade), competes at the Field Stadium. The Ricciardelli was recently renovated with synthetic grass. The other teams are GS Apocalypse, which was formed by Michele Pazienza, and Pol Sanseveresi, founded in 2008.

The men's team San Severo Volleyball and women's GS Intrepid Volleyball (colors: blue) play on the field of PalaMarconi.

== Twin towns ==
San Severo is twinned with:

- Bourg-en-Bresse, France
- Pamplona, Spain

== See also ==
- Roman Catholic Diocese of San Severo
