= Arcangelo Scacchi =

Italian mineralogist and natural scientist (1810–1893)

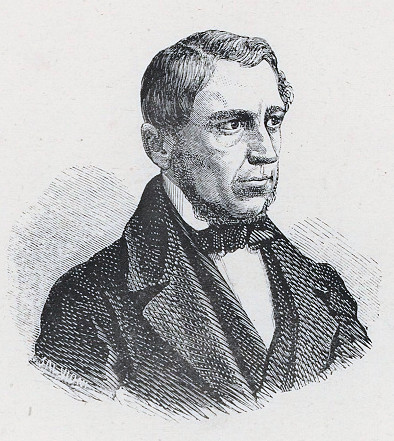
- Arcangelo Scacchi
- Born: 9 February 1810; Gravina, Kingdom of Naples
- Died: 11 October 1893 (aged 83); Naples, Kingdom of Italy
- Education: University of Naples Federico II
- Scientific career
- Fields: Mineralogy
- Workplaces: University of Naples Federico II; Real Museo Mineralogico of Naples

President of the Accademia nazionale delle scienze
- In office 6 April 1875 – 23 January 1893
- Preceded by: Francesco Brioschi
- Succeeded by: Luigi Cremona

Arcangelo Scacchi (9 February 1810 – 11 October 1893) was an Italian physician, mineralogist, malacologist, and naturalist. He served as a professor of mineralogy at the University of Naples. Between 1841 and 1884 he explored the volcanic lava flows of Mount Somma and named several minerals claimed as new forms from the deposits although they were subsequently re-identified as being already described. He also contributed to the study of volcanoes and molluscs.

== Life and work ==
Scacchi was born in Gravina, Puglia to lawyer Patrizio and Giovanna Pentibove. He was educated at the Bari seminary before joining the University of Naples in 1827, graduating with a degree in medicine in 1831. He practiced medicine in Naples where he met Leopoldo Pilla and took an interest in mineralogy and geology, and following the death of Matteo Tondi, Pilla appointed Scacchi as an assistant in 1835. He described several new minerals on the basis of morphological measurements using a Wollaston protractor provided by Teodoro Monticelli. These minerals included brocchite, which was found to be the same as a humite discovered by Jean-Louis de Bournon. Another mineral that he called voltaite turned out to have been described already by Scipione Breislak in 1792. He discovered what is now called as Afghanite.

In 1844 Scacchi was appointed professor of mineralogy at the University of Naples, and curator of the Real Museo Mineralogico (Royal Museum of Mineralogy). Here he was involved in acquiring several private collections into the Vesuvian collection. In 1845 he served as secretary during the 7th congress of Italian scientists held in Naples, leading an excursion to the Phlegraean Fields. Here he pointed out the volcanic cones and argued that they were formed by eruption and not local arching as suggested by the lifting theory of Leopold von Buch. His idea was examined by Charles Lyell. He was involved in studies of Vesuvius along with Luigi Palmieri and Giuseppe Guarini and interpreted the Melfi earthquake of August 1851 as being unrelated to volcanic activity nearby.

Scacchi was not favoured by the Bourbons and he was forced out of the Mineralogy Museum in 1848 and asked make it available for the Neapolitan Parliament. He however resisted and was punished by Giuseppe Garibaldi, but the public education minister Francesco de Sanctis could not remove him from his position as professor, since he was too well known internationally. When Naples was unified into the Savoy Kingdom, Scacchi was appointed senator in 1861. He continued his mineralogical studies and his studies included mirror symmetry in crystal forms or chirality. He described nearly 71 taxa of molluscs of which about 18 continue to be considered valid.

Scacchi married Giovanna Cassola in 1845 and they had nine children of whom two died young. He died in Naples on 11 October 1893. Scacchi was a member of several leading European academies. In 1861 he was elected a corresponding member of the Göttingen Academy of Sciences. In 1875 he became a member of the Accademia dei Lincei. Since 1867 he had been a foreign member of the Bavarian Academy of Sciences. In 1872 he was appointed a corresponding member of the Prussian Academy of Sciences, in 1887 of the French Academy of Sciences in Paris and in 1890 of the Russian Academy of Sciences in Saint Petersburg.

== Bibliography ==
- Ceglie, Rossella De (2009). "The scientific correspondence of Arcangelo Scacchi". Annals of Geophysics. 52 (6): 605–614.
- Mottana, Annibale (2018). "Scacchi, Arcangelo". Dizionario Biografico degli Italiani (in Italian). Vol. 91: Savoia–Semeria. Rome: Istituto dell'Enciclopedia Italiana. ISBN 978-88-12-00032-6.
