= Antonio D'Achiardi =

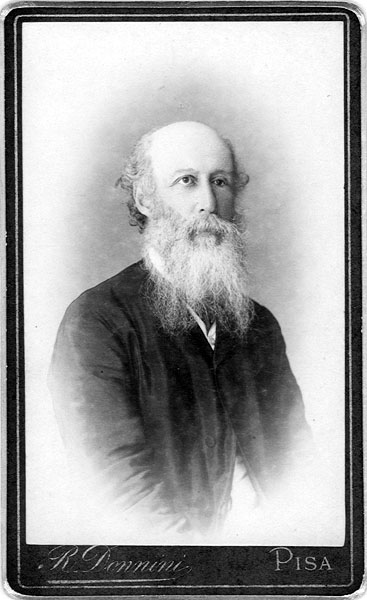
- Born: 28 November 1839; Pisa, Italy
- Died: 10 December 1902 (aged 63); Pisa, Italy
- Education: University of Pisa
- Occupations: Geologist, mineralogist
- Spouse: Marianna Camici
- Children: Giovanni D'Achiardi; Pietro D'Achiardi
- Parent(s): Giuseppe D'Achiardi (father); Virginia Ruschi (mother)
- Scientific career
- Workplaces: University of Pavia; University of Pisa

Antonio D'Achiardi (28 November 1839 in Pisa – 10 December 1902 in Pisa) was an Italian geologist, paleontologist and mineralogist known for his mineralogical and paleontological studies of Tuscany. He was the father of the mineralogist Giovanni D'Achiardi, and the artist, Pietro D'Achiardi.

In 1859 he received his doctorate in sciences from the University of Pisa, afterwards working as an assistant for chemistry (from 1861). Three months after this appointment, he lost the use of his left eye due to a laboratory accident involving nitric acid. He subsequently abandoned his career in chemistry, and instead devoted his attention to geology and mineralogy, becoming a student of Giuseppe Meneghini. He later became a professor of geology at Pavia and in 1874 was appointed a professor of mineralogy at the University of Pisa. In 1881 he established a laboratory of mineralogy at Pisa.

== Honors and recognitions ==
The mineral dachiardite honors his memory. In 1906, his son Giovanni D'Achiardi described and named the mineral after he discovered it in a granitic pegmatite.

A street in Rome is named after him.

== Selected works ==
- Coralli fossili del terreno nummulitico delle Alpi Venete, 1868.
- Sulle Calcarie lenticolare e grossolana di Toscana, 1874.
- Bibliografia mineralogica, geologica e paleontologica della Toscana, 1875.
- Sull'origine dell'acido borico e dei borati, considerazioni ..., 1878.
- I metalli loro minerali e miniere, 1883.
- Guida al corso di mineralogia, 1900.
