= Teodoro Monticelli =

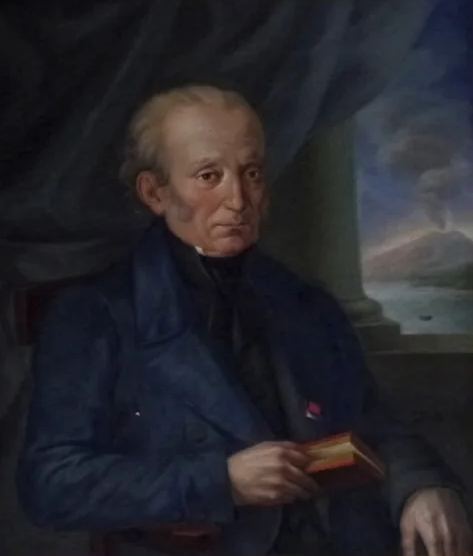
1843 portrait by Rocco Bovi

Teodoro Monticelli (October 5, 1759 – October 7, 1845) was an Italian Benedictine monk and geologist. He served as a professor of morality at the University of Naples and was involved in collecting minerals from the Vesuvius region and wrote about it in collaboration with Nicola Covelli.

Monticelli was born in Brindisi in a family of minor nobility, Francesco Antonio, Baron of Nicoletta and Cerreto, and Eleonora of Sala. As a younger son he was chosen to join the church rather than military service and was educated at Brindisi, Lecce, Naples and Rome. He became a monk in the Benedictine order and was appointed as a professor of morality at the University of Naples in 1792. Monticelli had studied under followers of Antonio Genovesi and in this period he became a radical Jacobin and freemason, joining the Società patriottica napoletana where a former priest Carlo Lauberg taught chemistry and mathematics for use in revolution. Monticelli was arrested in 1794, released and arrested again in 1795. He was offered a pardon if he revealed his collaborators but chose instead to stay in prison for six years at the Saint Elmo Castle and then on the island of Favignana. He was freed in 1801 as part of an amnesty in the Treaty of Florence. He then went to Rome to study geology and became a professor of ethics in Naples in 1806. He became head of the Collegio del Salvatore in 1807 and in 1808 he became secretary to the Academy of Sciences and given the title Cavaliere. He also dealt with the commission on general statistics and his first work was on bee-keeping for small farmers and on agriculture. He also worked on water supplies in the Kingdom of Naples. In 1822, following an eruption of Vesuvius, he examined the rocks and minerals and wrote a Prodromo della mineralogia vesuviana in collaboration with Nicola Covelli. The described the occurrence of minerals such as apatite and wollastonite. They classified volcanic material and began to correspond with Alexander von Humboldt and Humphry Davy. His position at the Società Reale Borbonica and the Academy of Science made him correspond widely. In 1814 he hosted Sir William Gell at his country house on the southern slope of Vesuvius. He assisted Davy in 1814-15 and lent instruments to Humboldt when he visited Naples in 1822. He also accompanied Charles Lyell who visited Vesuvius in 1828. He helped William Buckland visit with his wife in 1826. He helped Charles Jurgensen-Thomsen, guided the Duke of Buckingham in 1828 and sent his assistant Emmanuele Donati as a guide. He attended a meeting of Italian scientists following the inauguration of an observatory on the slopes of Mount Vesuvius. On the last day of the meeting, he died and his funeral in Pozzuoli was attended by many of the scientists.
