= Appio-Latino =

Q. IX Appio-Latino
- Quartiere of Rome
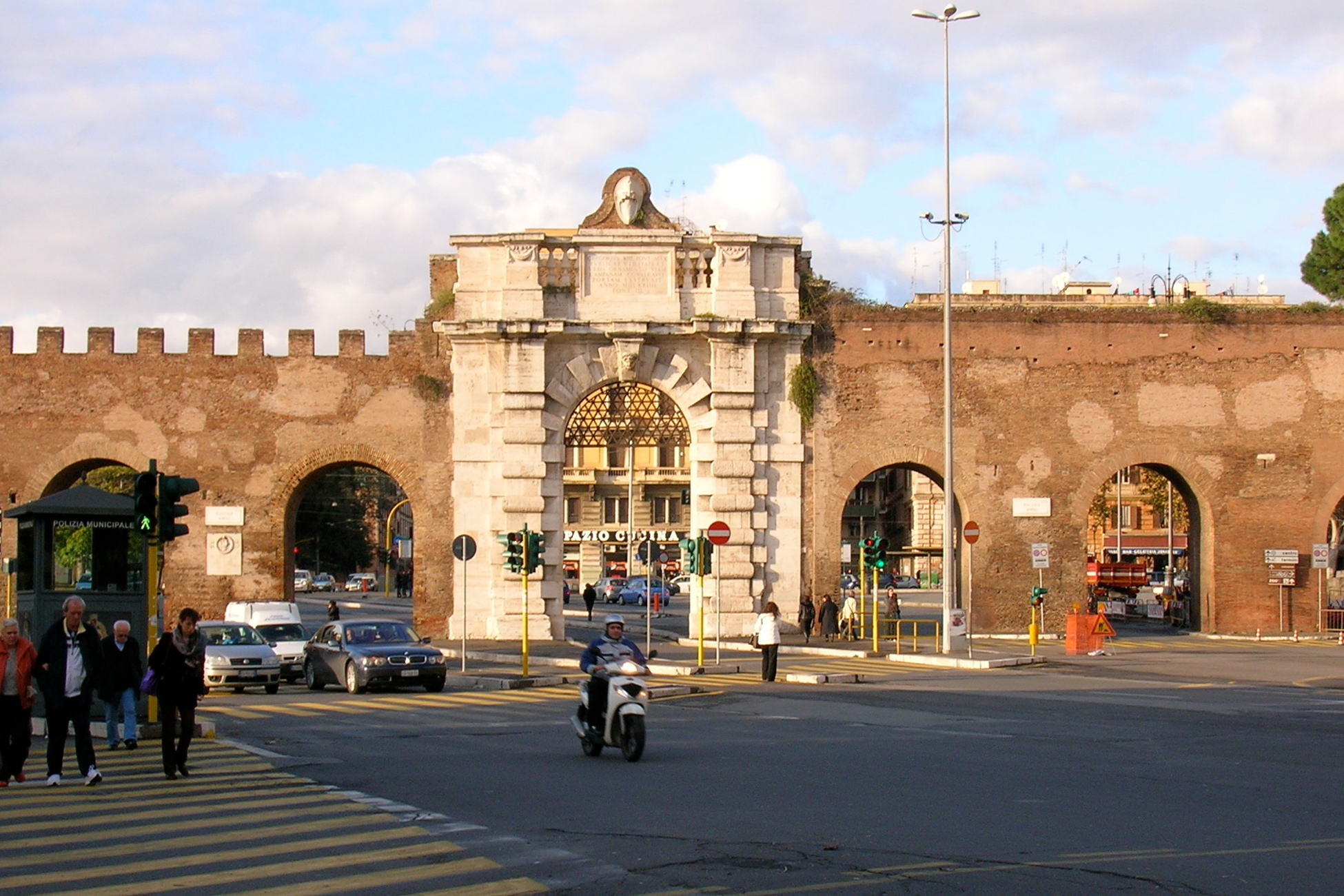
- Porta San Giovanni

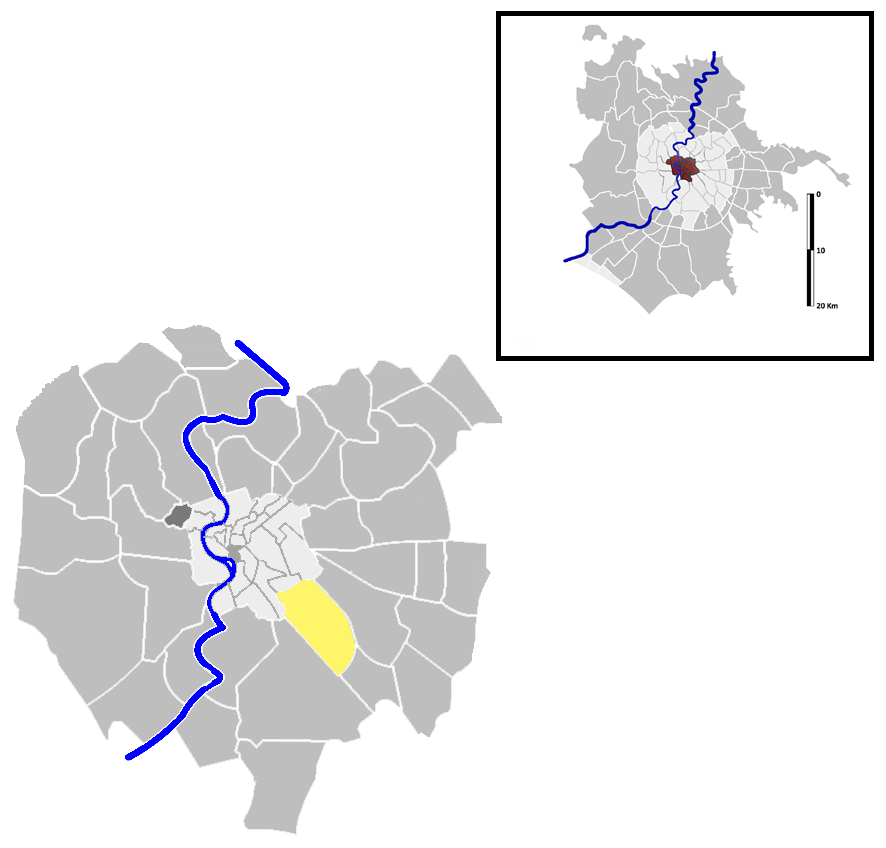
- Position of the quartiere within the city of Rome
- Country: Italy
- Region: Lazio
- Metropolitan City: Rome
- Comune: Rome
- Municipio: Municipio VII; Municipio VIII
- Established: 20 August 1921

Area
  - Total: 2.2584 sq mi (5.8491 km^{2})

Population (2016)
  - Total: 59,325
- Time zone: UTC+1 (CET)
  - Summer (DST): UTC+2 (CEST)

Appio-Latino is the 9th quartiere of Rome (Italy), identified by the initials Q. IX. The name derives from the ancient roads Via Appia and Via Latina. It belongs to the Municipio VII and Municipio VIII.

== History ==
The origins of the territory can be dated back to the early Roman age. The ancient Via Latina, that gives the name to the quarter, has been an important road axis linking Rome to Old Latium and to Campania and was already used by the Etruscans. The Via Appia, which was called longarum Regina viarum (i.e. "queen of the long roads") by Caecilius Statius, was built centuries after, in 312 BC. The territory of the quarter is crossed by five imposing aqueducts built between 144 BC and 212 AD: Aqua Marcia, Aqua Tepula and Aqua Iulia, gathered together within the same structure, Aqua Claudia and Anio Novus, as well as the Aqua Antoniniana, an offshoot of the Aqua Marcia.

The Roman heritage in the area is proved by a system of sumptuous patrician villas, a network of irrigation ditches, factories and defensive buildings, such as the Aurelian Walls. After the Gothic War the territory was gradually abandoned.

== Geography ==
The territory of Appio-Latino includes the urban zones 9D Appio and 9E Latino, as well as part of the urban zone 11X Appia Antica Nord.

=== Boundaries ===
The quarter borders northward with rione Monti (R. I), whose boundary is outlined by the stretch of the Aurelian Walls between Porta Metronia and Porta San Giovanni.

To the east, Appio-Latino borders with Quartiere Tuscolano (Q. VIII), from which it is separated by the stretch of Via Appia Nuova between Porta San Giovanni and Via dell'Almone.

Southward, the quarter borders with Quartiere Appio-Pignatelli (Q. XXVI), whose border is marked by Via dell'Almone and by Via Cecilia Metella.

Westward, it borders with Quartiere Ardeatino (Q. XX), from which it is separated by the stretch of Via Appia Antica between Via Cecilia Metella and the Aurelian Walls; and with Rione Celio, whose boundary is outlined by the Aurelian Walls, between Porta San Sebastiano and Porta Metronia.

=== Historical subdivisions ===
==== L'Alberone ====
The quarter includes the area traditionally known as L'Alberone, which is located on the right side of Via Appia Nuova, among the railway, the park of Villa Lazzaroni and Via Latina. It was built between the first years of the 20th century and the 1940s, becoming one of the first working class neighborhood in Rome.

The name toponym came from a centuries-old holly oak, which was nicknamed Alberone ("the big tree") because of its majestic appearance and its height. It grew near the corner between Via Appia Nuova and Via Gino Capponi and used to be a distinctive feature of the area even before the first edifices were built.

The tree, already assaulted by parasites and supported by a brick wall, ultimately died in 1980–81 and was torn down in the presence of many inhabitants of the quarter. To replace what was felt as a traditional symbol of the area, another centuries-old holly oak was planted in 1986 and lived until a violent storm tore it down in 2014. The current alberone has been planted in 2015 and it is still perceived as a symbol of the area, differentiating it from the remaining part of Appio-Latino.

==== Borghetto Latino ====
Next to the Valle della Caffarella, the current Via Latina hosted, until the 1970s, a shanty town known as Borghetto Latino. It hit the headlines in 1969, when the inhabitants, longing for more respectable housing conditions, occupied some buildings of a big real estate company in the rione Esquilino. The protest drew the attention of the New York Times when the inhabitants burnt down their old shacks to symbolize the fight for a better future.

=== Odonymy ===
Streets and squares of Appio-Latino are mainly named after renowned historians and after Roman and Greek regions and cities. Odonyms of the quarter can be categorized as follows:

- Ancient Roman and Greek cities, e.g. Via Ardea, Via Cerveteri, Via Elvia Recina, Via Ercolano, Via Faleria, Via Farsalo, Via Fregene, Via Gabi, Piazza Galeria, Via Imera, Piazzale Ipponio, Via Olbia, Piazza and Via Pompei, Piazza Roselle, Via Satrico, Via Sibari, Via Solunto, Via Stabia, Piazza Tarquinia, Piazza Tuscolo, Via Urbisaglia, Via Veio, Via Vescia, Via Vetulonia, Piazza Zama;
- Ancient Roman and Greek regions, e.g. Via Acaia, Via Britannia, Via Cappadocia, Via Cilicia, Via Dacia, Piazza Epiro, Via Etruria, Via Gallia, Via Illiria, Via Lidia, Via Macedonia, Via Magnagrecia, Largo Mesia, Via Mesopotamia, Via Pannonia, Via Siria, Via Tracia;
- Historians, e.g. Via Michele Amari, Piazza Scipione Ammirato, Via Cesare Baronio, Piazza Cesare Cantù, Via Gino Capponi, Via Giulio Cesare Cordara, Via Cesare Correnti, Largo Gaetano De Sanctis, Via Carlo Denina, Via Tommaso Fortifiocca, Via Paolo Giovio, Largo and Via Ferdinando Gregorovius, Via Stefano Infessura, Via Teodoro Mommsen, Piazza Paolo Diacono, Via Ludovico Pastor, Via Bartolomeo Platina, Via Camillo Porzio, Via Carlo Sigonio, Via Famiano Strada, Largo Pietro Tacchi Venturi, Via Tommaso da Celano, Via Luigi Tosti, Via Ferdinando Ughelli, Via Benedetto Varchi, Via Giovanni Villani;
- Italian cities, near the border with quarter Tuscolano, e.g. Via Acqui, Via Albenga, Via Cividale del Friuli, Via Domodossola, Via Ivrea, Via Mondovì, Via Novi, Via Pomezia, Via Susa, Via Tortona;
- Local toponyms, e.g. Piazza dell'Alberone, Piazzale Appio, Via della Caffarella, Via della Caffarelletta, Via dei Cessati Spiriti, Viale Metronio, Via delle Mura Latine, Via di Vigna Fabbri, Via di Villa Aquari.

== Places of interest ==
=== Civil buildings ===
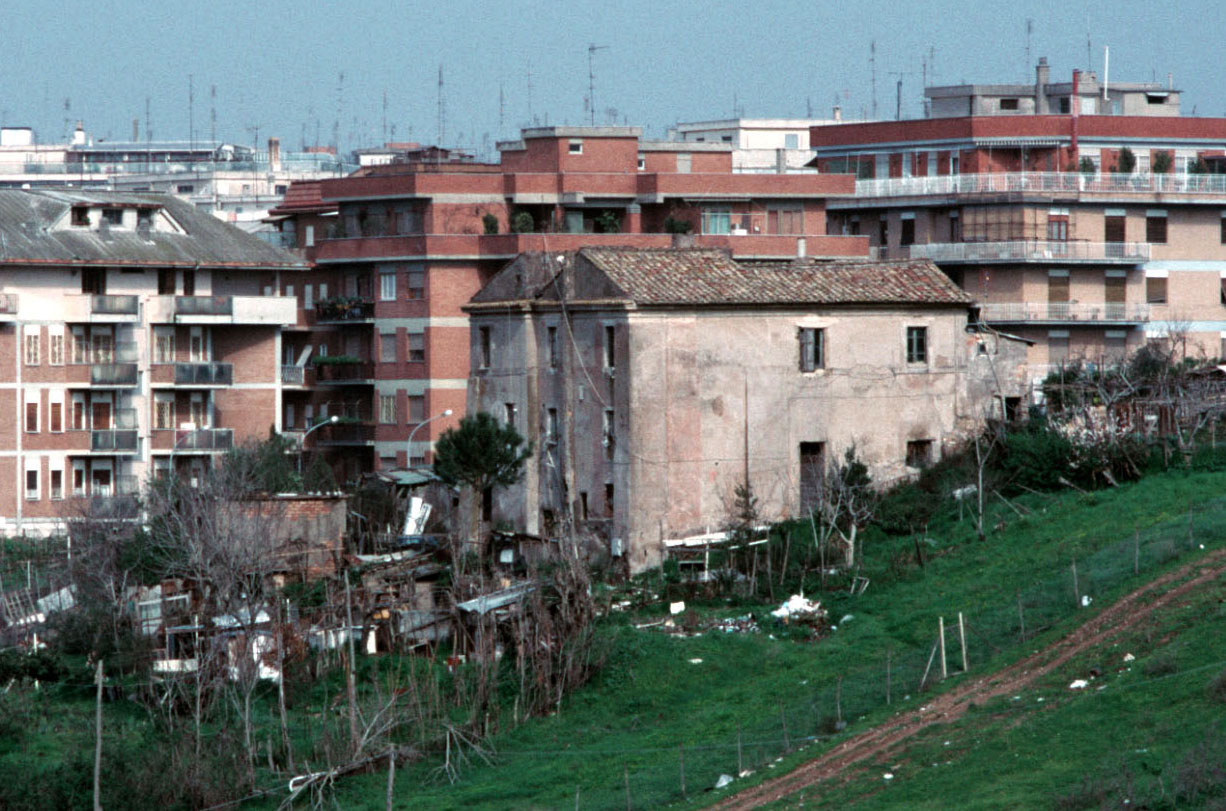
Casale Tarani (17th century) on the hill overlooking the Valle della Caffarella, surrounded by the quarter Appio Latino

- Turret-farmstead, in Via Antonio Coppi. Medieval farmstead. 41.869288°N 12.512867°E
- Tower of the Casale della Vaccareccia, in the Caffarella park. 13th-century tower. 41.863565°N 12.521470°E
- Valca intermedia, near the temple of Rediculus, in the Caffarella Park. 16th-century farmstead. 41.865334°N 12.516530°E
- Casale della Vaccareccia, in the Caffarella park. 17th-century farmstead. 41.863772°N 12.521265°E
- Villa Casali, in Via Appia Antica. 17th-century villa. 41.861775°N 12.510026°E
- Casale di Vigna Cardinali, in Via Latina. 17th-century farmstead. 41.867425°N 12.524130°E
- Casale Cenci near the Villa of Massenzio, in Via Appia Antica. 17th-century farmstead. 41.855120°N 12.518260°E
- Casale Tarani, in Via della Caffarella. 17th-century farmstead. 41.867165°N 12.521251°E
- Hosteria del Colombario dei Liberti di Augusto, in Via Appia Antica. 18th-century inn and farmstead. (1724). 41.864310°N 12.507316°E

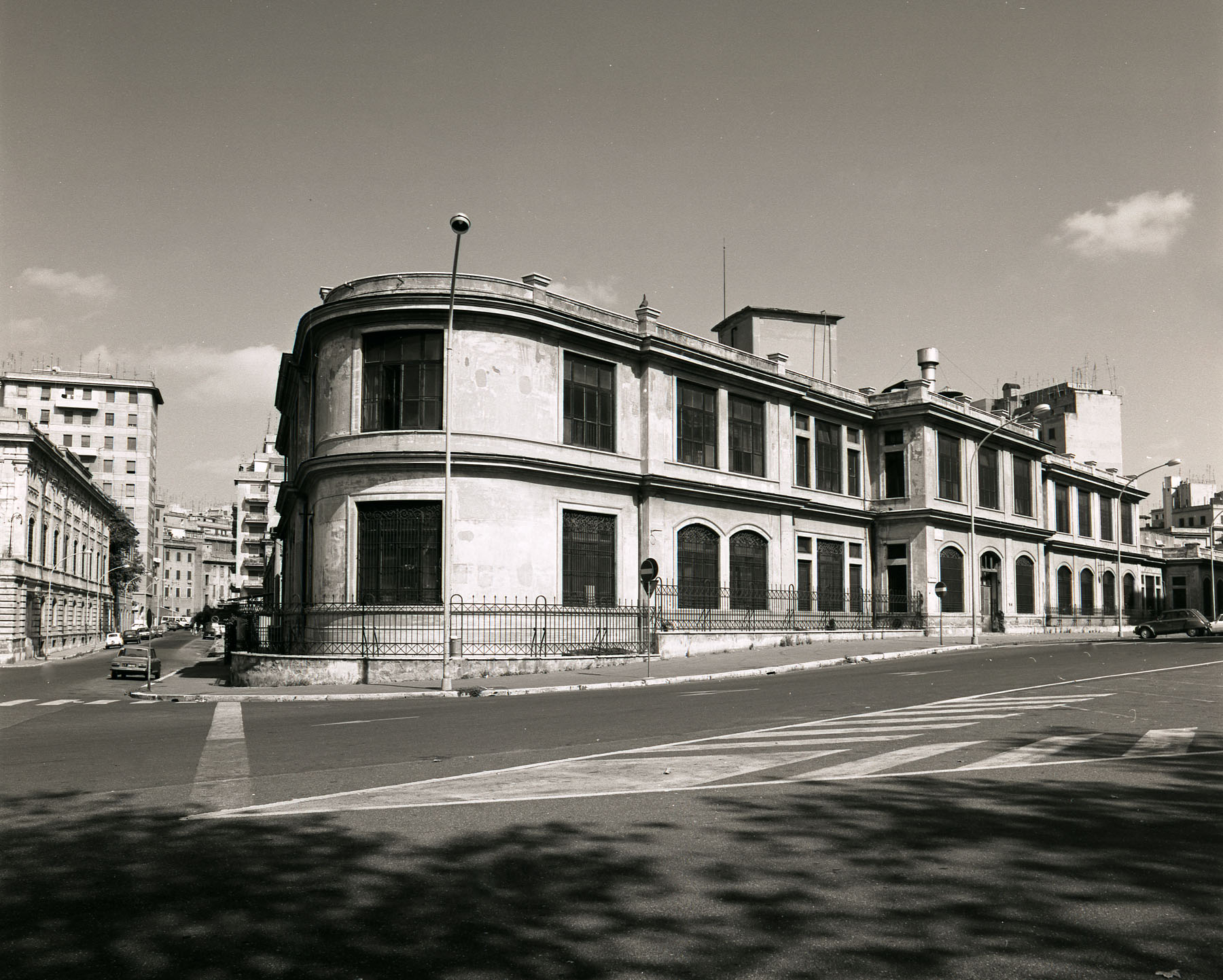
The Poligrafico dello Stato on Via G. Capponi in a 1985 picture

- Villa Lazzaroni, in Via Appia Nuova. 19th-century villa.
- Residential buildings of the Istituto Autonomo Case Popolari Appio I, among Piazza Tuscolo, Via Soana and Via Astura. 20th-century public housing buildings (1923–26). 41.880456°N 12.509007°E

complex in barocchetto romano style, designed by architect Camillo Palmerini.

- Public housing buildings of Viale Metronio. 20th-century public housing buildings (1895–1934).

28 buildings in barocchetto romano style.

- Residential buildings of the Istituto Autonomo Case Popolari Appio III, among Via Magna Grecia, Via Faleria and Via Ardea. 20th-century public housing buildings (1925–30).

complex in barocchetto romano style, designed by architects Martini and Angelo Vicario.

- Palazzetto della Telefonica Tirrena, on the corner between Via Sannio and Via Corfinio. 20th-century building (1925–28).

office building in barocchetto romano style, designed by architect Vittorio Ballio Morpurgo. It was the former seat of the Telefonica Tirrena phone company.

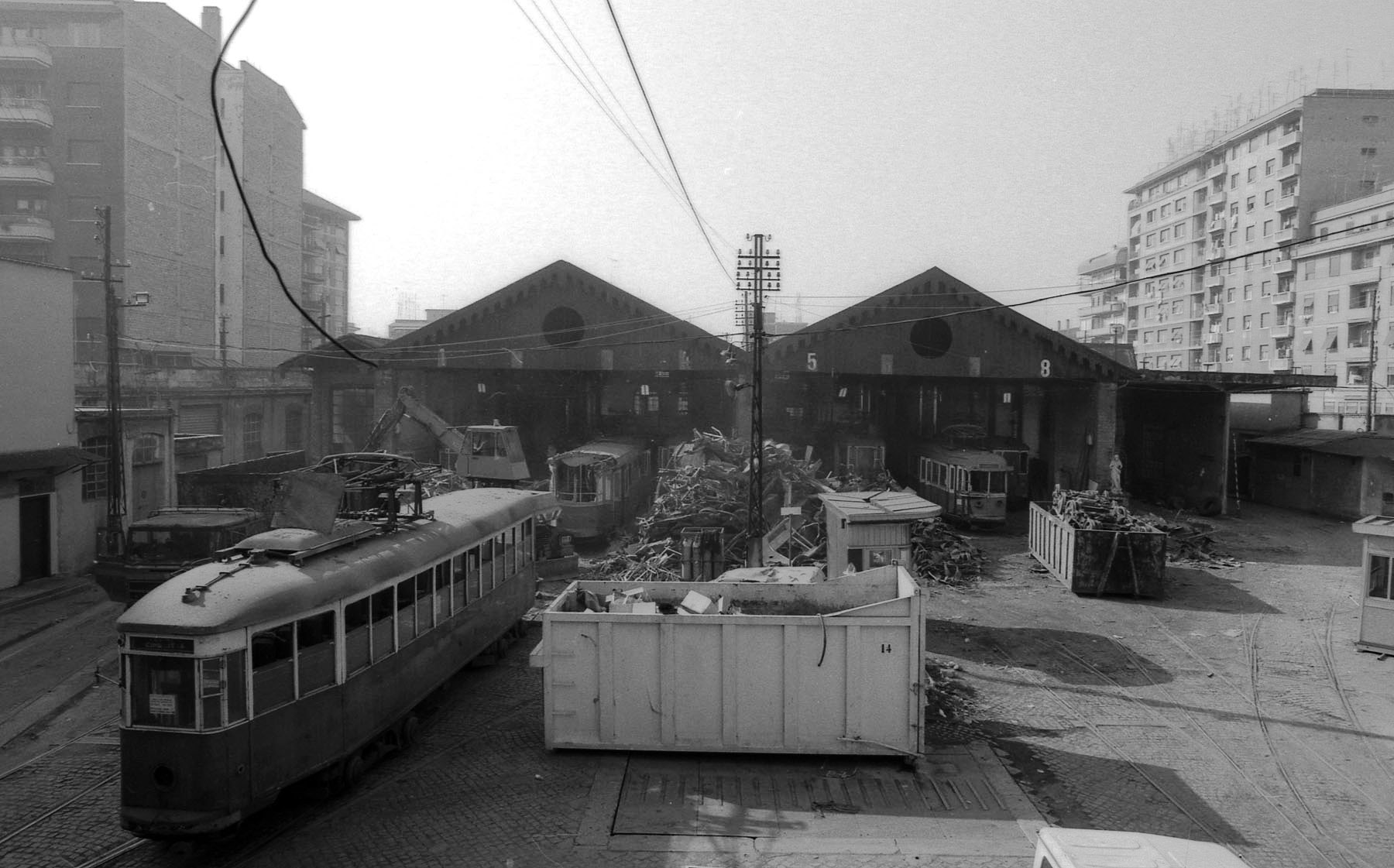
The STEFER Appio storage in Via Appia Nuova in 1992 during the demolition of some trams

- Condominium by Pietro Lombardo, in Via Domodossola. 20th-century residential building (1930). 41.879551°N 12.514230°E

Rationalist residential building designed by architect Pietro Lombardo.

- Former Casa del Fascio, in Via Sannio. 20th-century building (1930–31). 41.882911°N 12.506283°E
- Condominium in barocchetto romano style, in Via Antonio Coppi. 20th-century residential building. (1931). 41.869958°N 12.514428°E
- Villa Alfano, in Via Appia Pignatelli. 20th-century villa (1940). 41.857231°N 12.518460°E

designed by architect Raffaele De Vico.

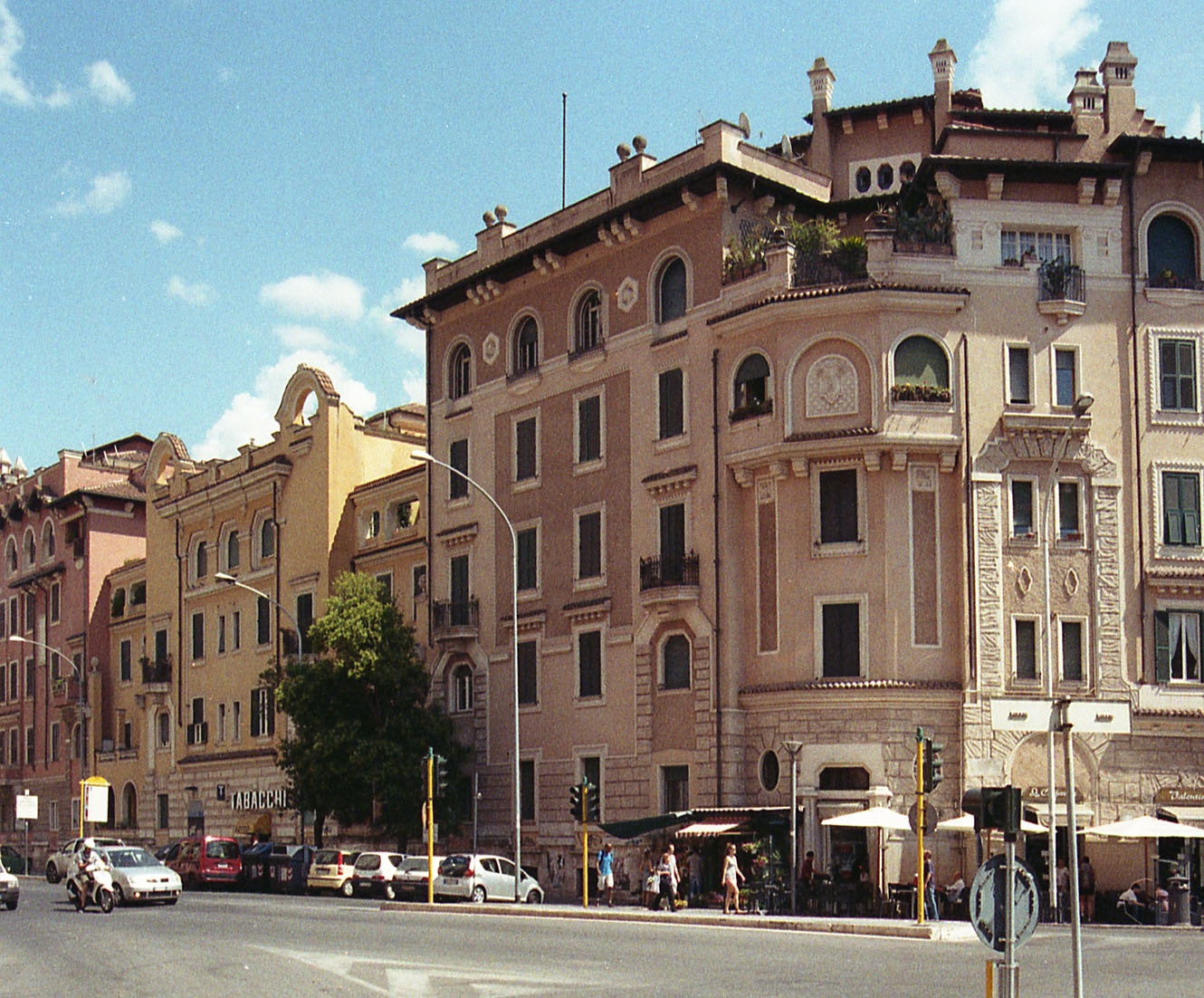
Public house buildings in Via Soana.

- Istituto Poligrafico e Zecca dello Stato, in Via Gino Capponi. 20th-century building.
- Modernist building, in Via Magna Grecia. 20th-century building (1952). 41.884310°N 12.509521°E

designed by architect and sculptor Angelo Di Castro.

- Palazzina Ridolfi, in Via Populonia. 20th-century building (1952–53). 41.876088°N 12.505361°E

Modernist building designed by architect Mario Ridolfi.

- Mercato Metronio, in Via Magna Grecia. 20th-century building (1956–57).

Modernist marketplace designed by architect Florestano Di Fausto and realized by Riccardo Morandi.

- Former STEFER Appio storage, in Via Appia Nuova. 41.873972°N 12.522392°E

Storage facility and workshop of the local public tram company STEFER, it was turned into a mixed-use building in the 1990s.

=== Religious buildings ===
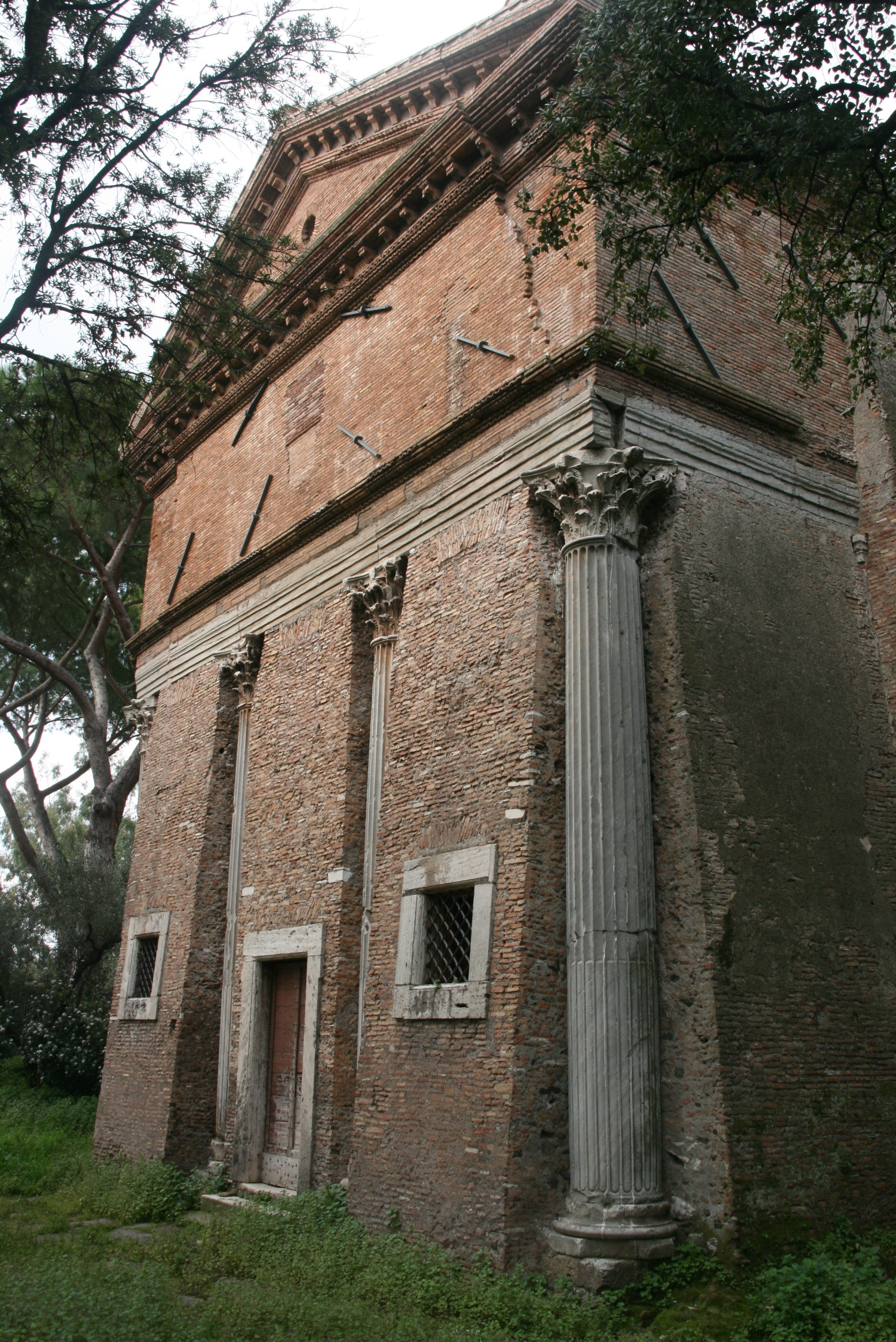
Sant'Urbano alla Caffarella

- Sant'Urbano alla Caffarella, within the Caffarella park. 6th-century church.
- Chapel of Reginald Pole, in Via Appia Antica. 16th-century votive niche. 41.865823°N 12.505337°E
- Domine quo vadis, in Via Appia Antica. 18th-century church.
- Natività di Nostro Signore Gesù Cristo, in Via Gallia. 20th-century church.
- Ognissanti, in Via Appia Nuova. 20th-century church.
- Sant'Antonio di Padova a Circonvallazione Appia, in Circonvallazione Appia. 20th-century church (1938).
- San Giovanni Battista de Rossi, in Via Cesare Baronio. 20th-century church (1940).
- Preziosissimo Sangue di Nostro Signore Gesù Cristo, in Largo Pannonia. 20th-century church (1943).
- San Giuda Taddeo ai Cessati Spiriti, in Via Amedeo Crivellucci. 20th-century church (1960).
- Santissimo Nome di Maria in Via Latina, in Via Centuripe. 20th-century church (1980).
- Santa Caterina da Siena a Via Populonia, in Via Populonia. 21st-century church (2013).

=== Archaeological sites ===
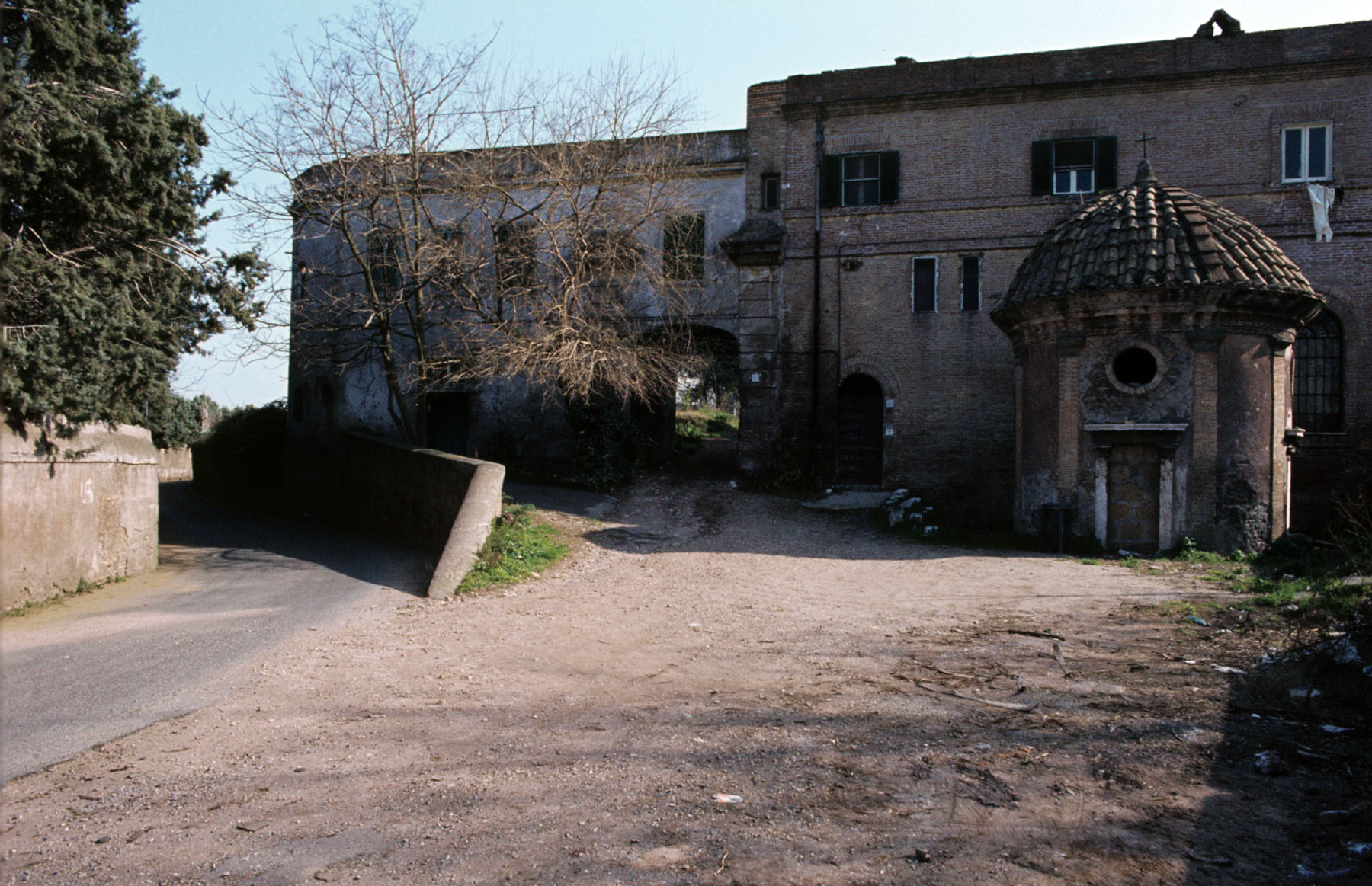
The crossroads between Via della Caffarella (on the left) and Via Appia Antica, with the chapel of Reginald Pole (on the right)

- Villa of Via Populonia, in Via Populonia. Republican age villa. 41.876964°N 12.506522°E
- Roman cistern, in Via Elea. Republican age cistern. 41.881868°N 12.503607°E
- Roman villa near Casale Tarani, in Via Carlo de Bildt. Imperial age villa. 41.867799°N 12.518550°E
- Cistern near Casale Tarani, in Via della Caffarella. Imperial age cistern. 41.866119°N 12.521006°E
- Roman villa near Casale di Quo Vadis, in Via Appia Antica. Imperial age villa. 41.866179°N 12.505277°E
- Nymphaeum of Egeria, within the Caffarella park. 41.859336°N 12.524270°E
- Temple of Cerere and Faustina, within the Caffarella park. Tempo del II secolo. 41.857952°N 12.524297°E
- Fountain in Via Cesare Baronio. Imperial age cistern. 41.871026°N 12.517908°E
- Roman cistern, in Via Latina. Imperial age cistern. 41.866347°N 12.526481°E
- Castra of Amba Aradam-Ipponio. 2nd-century castra. 41.882949°N 12.502738°E
- Torre Valca, within the Caffarella Park. 13th-century tower. 41.858174°N 12.529246°E
- Tomb of Caecilia Metella, in Via Appia Antica.
- Villa of Maxentius, in Via Appia Antica.
- Hypogeum of Vibia.
- Hypogeum of Trebius Justus
- Via Dino Compagni Hypogeum
- Vigna Randanini catacombs.

=== Parks ===
- Caffarella park.
- Appian Way Regional Park.
