= Via dei Cessati Spiriti (Rome) =

Street in Rome, Italy

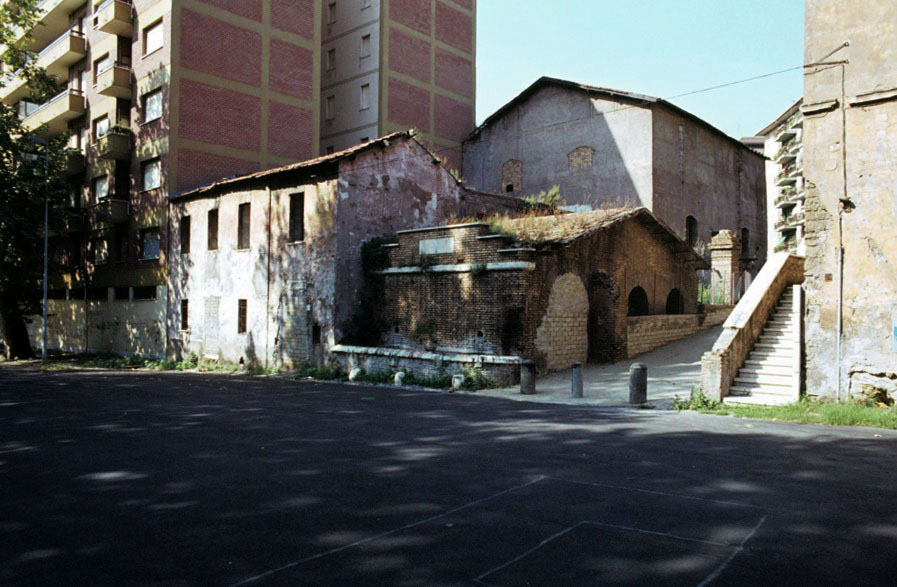
- The ruins of the former Fonderie Bruni (1983).
- Interactive map of Via dei Cessati Spiriti
- Type: Driveway
- Length: 0.470 km (0.292 mi)
- Location: Municipio VIII, Rome (Italy)
- Quarter: Q. IX Appio-Latino
- Postal code: 00179
- From: Via Appia Nuova
- Major junctions: Via Latina
- To: Via Appia Nuova

Construction
- Inauguration: 1940s

Via dei Cessati Spiriti is a street in Rome (Italy), established as a result of an adjustment of the route of Via Appia Nuova, which took place in the 1940s.

== Name ==
The new street was entitled "Via dei Cessati Spiriti" by Resolution of the Municipal Council nr. 14 of February 2, 1945, which reads:

«The stretch of Via Appia Nuova which, following the adjustment of the route of the same, has come to form a road in its own right which, departing from Via Appia Nuova itself, almost in front of the Velodrome, and precisely at the street number 618, reaches again Via Appia Nuova at Arco di Travertino.»

The odonimy of Rome describes the name as follows: "From the evildoers and people of ill repute who infested the area".

== History ==
The area of the Caffarella valley, close to the junction between the Via Latina and the former route of the Via Appia Nuova, had been called delli Spiriti (Italian for "of the Spirits") since the 16th century, due to unpleasant nighttime meetings.
It is said, in fact, that many wanderers stopped with their carriage and horse to eat and rest in an old tavern that was there; when they left the tavern, both carriage and horse had disappeared.
Since nobody could ever see who carried out these thefts, and because of the noises that were heard at night, the responsibility was attributed to the spirits that haunted the valley.

The legend survived until 19th century when, to chase away such 'spirits', a statuette of the Madonna was placed on the front of a building.
The end of the thefts of carriages and horses generated the rumor that the spirits had 'ceased', so that a tavern of the place took the name of Osteria dei Cessati Spiriti ("Tavern of the Ceased Spirits").

On July 2, 1910, Adriano Bennicelli – a Roman nobleman who lived between 1860 and 1925 and was nicknamed il Conte Tacchia – called an electoral rally at the Osteria dei Cessati Spiriti, by putting up a large number of posters, after having decided to run for the elections for the Chamber of Deputies in the lists of the Liberal Party. However, the rally had little response and the low number of votes did not allow him to be elected.

=== Fonderie Bruni ===
In 1890 – as attested by the marble plaque above the abreuvoir – the Bruni company moved to the street from its former headquarters in Via Tiburtina: the firm operated in the casting of statues until its shutdown in 1965.
The abandoned and damaged building, in need of maintenance and with no intended use, appeared as a ruin of industrial archeology in danger of collapse until the end of 2018; during 2019, the two buildings of the complex saw the start of the restoration and renovation works, aimed at the construction of lofts and apartments.

== In popular culture ==
The road appears in Fellini's film La Dolce Vita, in the scene in which Marcello and Maddalena take the prostitute Ninni to her house by car.

== Transports ==
Metro stop (Colli Albani, line A)

== Bibliography ==
- Claudio Rendina; Donatella Paradisi (2004). Le strade di Roma. Vol. first volume A-D. Rome: Newton & Compton editori. ISBN 88-541-0208-3.
- Tullio Kezich; V. Boarini (2009). "Un affresco alla Picasso". Federico Fellini. Il libro dei film. Rome: Rizzoli. ISBN 978-88-17-03282-7.
