= Hypogeum of Trebius Justus =

The Hypogeum of Trebius Justus is a catacomb on the ancient via Latina, now at the junction of via Latina and via Mantellini in the modern Appio-Latino quarter. It is named after a young man buried in its main chamber.

It was accidentally rediscovered in March 1911 when the owner of a small villa decided to carry out works to check the state of his property. This unearthed the entrance to an underground cubiculum which led to a completely frescoed main burial chamber. He informed the Pontificia commissione di archeologia sacra and at the end of March the same year its secretary Rudolf Kanzler inspected the complex - he did not find any traces of Christianity but produced an accurate photographic record of it. Once the works ended the cemetery was closed up, with the present quarter built over it with new palazzi and streets.

It was reopened in 1976, this time through a ground floor trapdoor in the small villa - the Sovrintendenza alle Antichità di Roma produced another photographic survey, but then closed up the complex again. A third inspection was carried out in 1996 to begin restoration work. An expropriation case is underway and in the meantime it is privately run with the small villa on top of it rented by the Sovrintendenza Archeologica del Lazio.

== Bibliography ==
- Maria Andaloro (2006). "Le pitture dell'ipogeo di Trebio Giusto". L'orizzonte tardoantico e le nuove immagini, corpus I. Milano: Jaca Book. pp. 259–263. ISBN 978-88-16-60371-4.
- Pio Franchi De' Cavalieri (1912). Iscrizioni graffite nel vestibolo dell'ipogeo di Trebio Giusto.
- Leonella De Santis; Giuseppe Biamonte (2011). Le catacombe di Roma. Roma: Newton Compton Editori. ISBN 978-88-541-2771-5.
- R. Kanzler R. (1911). "Scoperta del sepolcro di Trebio Giusto sulla via Latina". Nuovo Bullettino di Archeologia Cristiana. pp. 201–207.
- Orazio Marucchi (1911). "L'ipogeo sepolcrale di Trebio Giusto recentemente scoperto sulla via Latina e proposta di spiegazione gnostica delle sue pitture". Nuovo Bullettino di Archeologia Cristiana. pp. 209–235.
- Orazio Marucchi (1911). Scoperta del sepolcro di Trebio Giusto sulla via Latina.
- Orazio Marucchi (1912). Ulteriori osservazioni sull'ipogeo di Trebio Giusto in conferma dell'ipotesi sulla natura gnostica del monumento.
- Mario Petrassi (1976). "Torna alla luce l'ipogeo di Trebio Giusto". Capitolium. anno LI (2–3). Roma: Edizione del Comune di Roma: 17–32. Archived from the original on 23 September 2015.
- Rossella Rea, ed. (2004). L'ipogeo di Trebio Giusto sulla via Latina: scavi e restauri. Roma: Pontificia commissione di archeologia sacra. ISBN 978-88-88420-03-5.
