= Arcosolium =

Place for burial

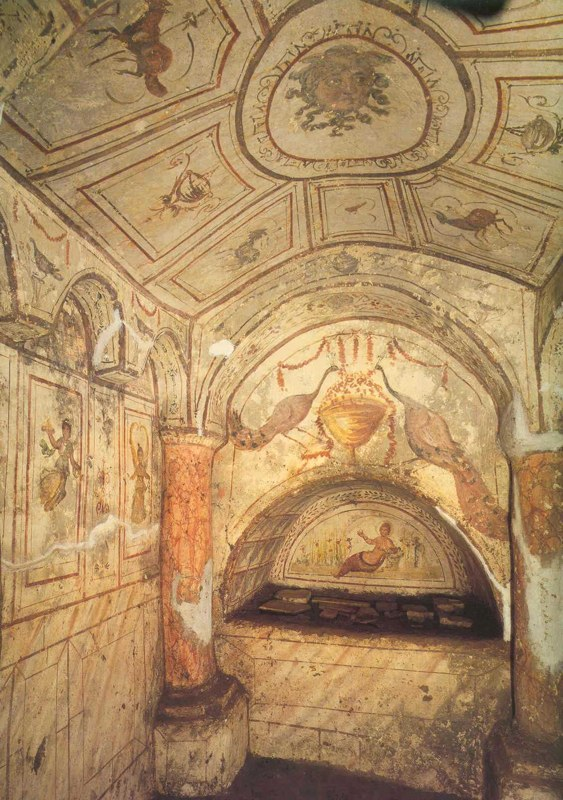
A 4th-century arcosolium in the hypogeum of Via Dino Compagni (Via Latina Catacomb), Rome. The figure of the frescoes is the goddess Tellus, after whom this tomb is named.

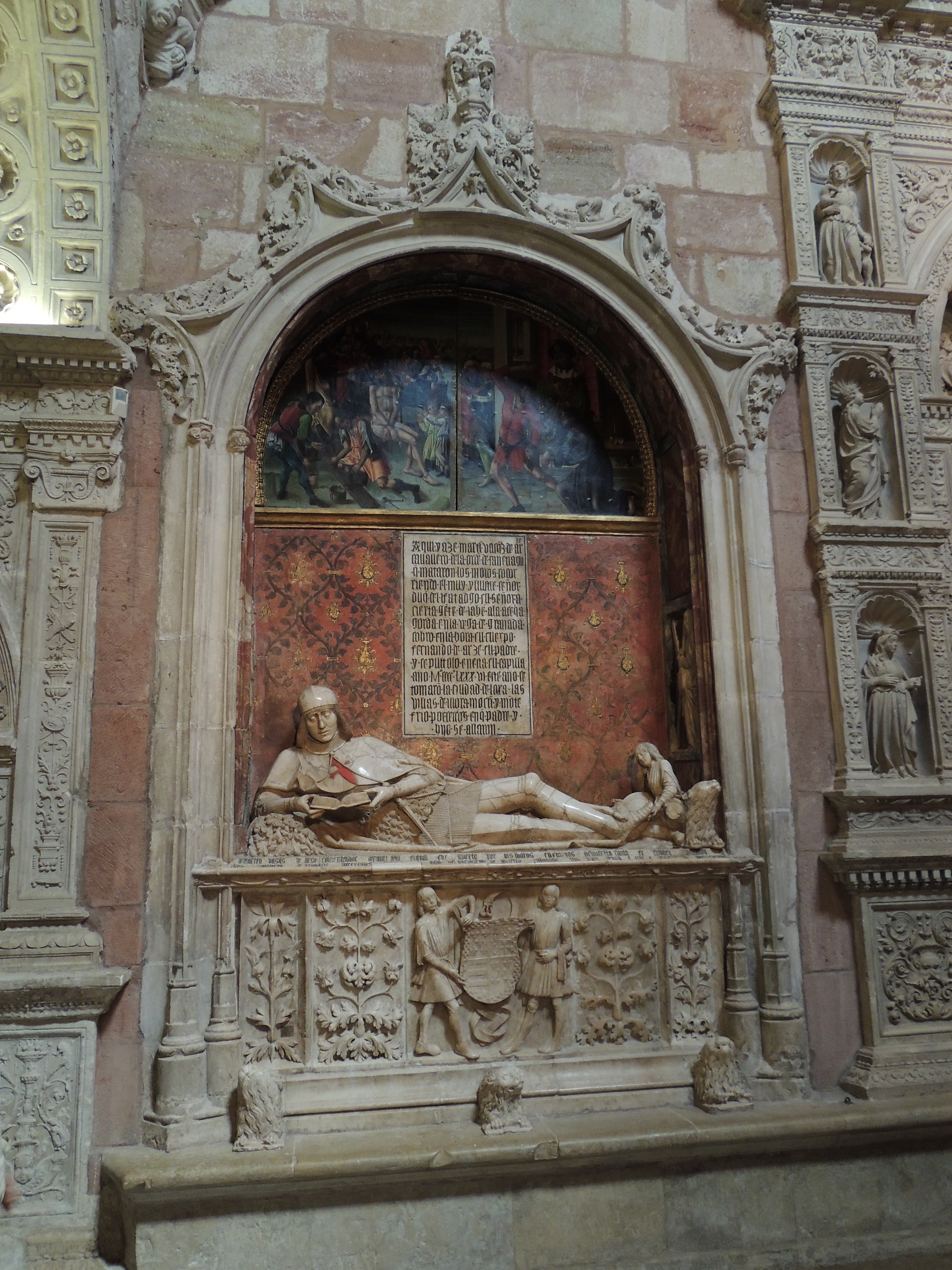
The 15th-century arcosolium of the doncel Martín Vázquez de Arce, in the Sigüenza Cathedral, Spain. Like most post-Roman era arcosolia, it is aboveground.

An arcosolium, plural arcosolia, is an arched recess used as a place of entombment. The word is from Latin arcus, "arch", and solium, "throne" (literally "place of state") or post-classical "sarcophagus".

Early arcosolia were carved out of the living rock in catacombs. In the very earliest of these, the arched recess was cut to ground level. Then a low wall would be built in the front, leaving a trough (the cubiculum, "chamber") in which to place the body. A flat stone slab would then cover the chamber containing the body, thus sealing it. The stone slab occasionally also served as an altar, especially for Christians, who celebrated Mass on them. In the later arcosolia, the arched recess was carved out to about waist height. Then the masons cut downwards to make the chamber into which the corpse would be placed. In effect, the trough was then a sarcophagus with living rock on five of its six faces. As before, a flat stone slab would then seal the cubiculum.

From the 13th century onwards, and continuing into the Renaissance, arcosolia were built above ground, particularly in the walls of churches. In these post-Roman era recesses, which were built of brick and marble, the sarcophagi are usually separate from the arch. These tombs are highly ornamented in the styles of those periods; the Flamboyant Gothic, Plateresque, and High Renaissance styles are all represented.

== See also ==
- Loculus (architecture): also niche-like
- Kokh (tomb): also rock-cut

== References and bibliography ==
- Leclercq, H. (1907) in: Dictionnaire d'archéologie chrétienne et de liturgie; v. 1, i, coll. 2774–87
- Schulte, A.J. (1907). Altar (in Liturgy). In The Catholic Encyclopedia. New York: Robert Appleton Company. https://www.newadvent.org/cathen/01346a.htm
