= Hypogeum of Vibia =

- Location within Italy
- 41°51′42.84″N 12°30′36.72″E
- Periods: Late Antique
- Location: Italy
- Region: Metropolitan City of Rome Capital, Lazio

Site notes
- Archaeologists: Giovanni Gaetano Bottari, Giuseppe Marchi, Antonio Ferrua
- Management: Pontifical Commission for Sacred Archaeology

The Hypogeum of Vibia is part of a small complex of pagan burial chambers in Rome which were constructed along the Via Appia in the late 4th century CE. It is named for the burials of a woman named Vibia and her husband Vincentius, a priest of the Thraco-Phrygian god Sabazios. The hypogeum is notable for the paintings that show the deceased figures in mythological scenes and in the underworld, and for their accompanying inscriptions. Numerous other decorated tombs and inscriptions were found in the complex.

== Location ==
The Hypogeum of Vibia is located in the Appio-Latin quarter of Rome (QIX). The Via Appia is well known for the many funerary monuments, tombs, catacombs, and other hypogea which line the road. This hypogeum is located on the left side of the street, approximately 1.5 kilometers outside the Aurelian Walls, where the Via Appia passes through the Porta San Sebastiano as it leaves the boundaries of the ancient city. It is about 250 meters north-east from the large Catacomb of Callixtus complex, which is found on the opposite side of the Via Appia and in which many popes and saints were interred in the 2nd-4th centuries. There are many other small hypogea and tombs neighbouring the Hypogeum of Vibia, as well as the notable early Christian catacombs of San Sebastiano and the large Catacombs of Praetextatus a short way down the Via Appia. Another nearby landmark is a plaque across the street, marking where the Via Appia's second milestone would have been in antiquity.
The entrance to the catacombs can be accessed now at the address 101 Via Appia Antica, but in ancient times it would have been reached by a lane that branched off from the main road.

== Structure and layout ==
This catacomb was constructed in approximately 350 CE, and includes three main galleries which were carved out of the bedrock. The passageways of the catacomb diverge from a 25-meter stairway that leads down from the original entrance towards a well. The main burials are located approximately 7–9 meters below the surface level, and to the south-west of the stairway to the well. The gallery with the burials of Vibia, Vincentius, and Caricus is roughly at the center of the complex. The so-called arcosolium of the Vintners is north-west of these. Further down the passageway south of Vibia's burial, there is a burial for some priests of Mithras; branching off just before this, there is a separate square chamber which includes multiple burials in both arcosolia and slot graves. The chamber is supported by columns in each corner that were carved out of the tufa and form a cross-vault overhead.

The complex shows a lack of deliberate planning, and is a good example of privately owned hypogea which became connected in later time periods. This was common in late antiquity; as the popularity of inhumation burials increased, previously separate hypogea became connected, sometimes even linking Christian and pagan burial spaces.

== Arcosolium of Vibia and Vincentius ==
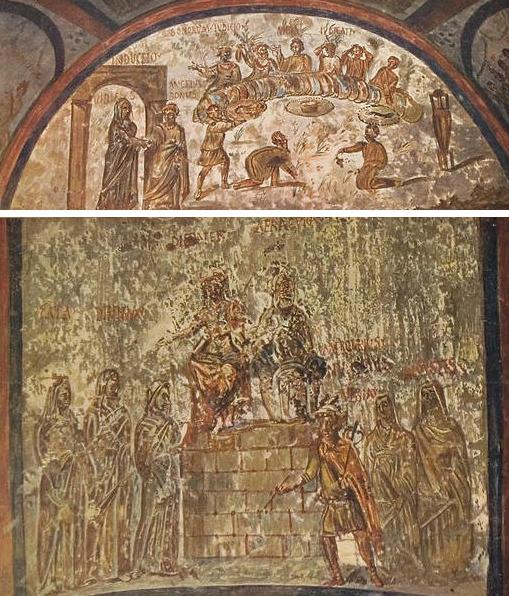
Lunette in the Vibia arcosolium featuring the Banquet Scene (above) and arch panel featuring the final judgement of Vibia (below)

Vibia and Vincentius were buried in the same arcosolium, which dates to the late 4th century CE and is decorated with multiple painted scenes. There are three scenes on the underside of the arch. The first of these depicts Vibia as Proserpina being abducted by Pluto on a quadriga, a scene which was a common visual metaphor for death in Roman art. The painted caption of the scene explains that it is the "Abduction and Descent of Vibia," which is further reinforced by the presence of Mercury in the scene, fulfilling his role as a psychopomp. The center scene here shows the final judgement of Vibia by Pluto and Proserpina (labelled Dispater and Aeracura); she is led into the scene by Mercury and Alcestis, and the Fata Divina, or the shades of the Dead, look on. The third scene in the arch shows Vincentius in a happy afterlife, as one of "seven devout priests" reclining and banqueting together.

The lunette of the arcosolium is captioned inductio Vibies, and it shows Vibia being led by an angelic figure into the afterlife. She is then shown, like Vincentius above, reclining on a stibadium couch and feasting with six other figures, who, according to the caption, were also judged to be righteous (bonorum iudicio iudicati). During its early investigations, the hypogeum was also called the cimitero delle monachelle or "cemetery of the little nuns," since the six other figures were mistaken for nuns due to their veils.

Vincentius is named in an inscription above the graves that reads: "Here you see the peaceful harbour of Vincentius. Many have preceded me and I await you all. Eat, drink, be merry and come to me. Here is buried the priest of the Sabazius, Vincentius, who practised the sacred rites with devotion."

== Other burials ==
The arcosolium across the gallery from that of Vibia and Vincentius was also decorated with paintings, although they have not been well-preserved. A nude depiction of Venus is painted on the underside of the arch, flanked by 4 figures. There are two figures on the wall into which the niche is carved, which are damaged and difficult to identify. While some claim that this burial is also connected to the cult of Sabazios, others have interpreted them as references to the Mithraic Mysteries. This is due to the figures flanking Venus on the right side of the arch, one of which is an armed figure which seems to represent the miles (soldier) level of Mithraic initiation. The soldier stands next to a woman kneeling and holding a garland. The figures on the left side of Venus are too damaged to identify. The name of the deceased is unknown for this burial.

Beside the unknown "soldier's" burial is another arcosolium, with an inscription to Caricus, a priest (sacerdos) of Mithras.

In another gallery down the corridor from Vibia and Vincentius, a funerary inscription was found dedicated to two more priests of Mithras (sacerdotibus dei Solis Invicti Mitrae). It identifies Aurelius Faustinianus and Aurelius Castricius as the priests, and a woman named Clodia Celeriana who is apparently the wife of Faustinianus and the mother of Castricus. The inscription was dedicated by multiple people, suggesting a relatively large family with a strong connection to the Mithraic cult.

The arcosolium of the "Vintners" has some well-preserved paintings relating to the production and transportation of wine, and is found in the latest part of the complex. The underside of the arch shows three scenes respectively featuring a figure with wineskins, a flute player, and stacked wine barrels. The central lunette features a cargo ship, presumably transporting wine.

There are many other small tombs which were connected to this complex by both ancient and modern passages. Some other inscriptions found include an epitaph for Clemens, an imperial freedman; an epitaph for Leontius, set up by his wife Laea; and an epitaph for Caelestina, set up by her husband Victorinus. Ferrua identified some of the burials as Christian, although it seems that the majority were pagan.

== Archaeology and research ==
The hypogeum was first recorded by Giovanni Gaetano Bottari in 1754, but he did not publish details about its archaeology or location, and he assumed that it was part of the nearby catacombs of Callixtus. He noted only that it was found beneath the "Casale della Torretta" estate. The site was rediscovered by Giuseppe Marchi in the 1840s, who misidentified it instead as the catacombs of Praetextatus. By the end of the 19th century, archaeologists realized that the burials were in fact pagan, and that they were originally placed in separate private hypogea that were joined together in later times.

More complete excavations were carried out from 1951-1952 by Antonio Ferrua, a Jesuit priest working on behalf of the Pontifical Commission of Sacred Archaeology. Ferrua published his findings in 1971 and 1973, and these reports contain some black and white photographs of the paintings and inscriptions in the tombs as well as sketch plans of the structure. It was also discovered that the area had been used as a pozzolana quarry in later times, although this took place at shallower levels than the burials. The hypogeum is still under the care of The Pontifical Commission for Sacred Archeology, and its website includes more images of the inscriptions and tomb decoration.

== See also ==
- Vibia gens
