= Via Dino Compagni Hypogeum =

The Via Dino Compagni Hypogeum or Via Latina Catacomb is an underground cemetery on via Dino Compagni in Rome, near via Latina, in the Appio-Latino quartiere. Built in late antiquity but appearing in no ancient sources, it is now privately-run.

It was rediscovered during the construction of foundations for a new palazzo in 1956 and was kept secret until the palazzo was complete, leading to damage to its frescoes and structures from tombaroli and concrete casting. Only in November 1956 did engineer Mario Santa Maria inform the Pontificia commissione di archeologia sacra of the catacomb's discovery. Father Antonio Ferrua was ordered to visit the site and immediately discovered its exceptional nature, followed by months of excavation until the following June.

On a single-level, it was first dug to house the tomb of one or more families related to each other (their name or names are unknown), not all of whose members had converted to Christianity, as shown by the frescoes featuring both Christian and pagan subjects. For the richness of its decoration, many scholars such as Leonella De Santis have referred to the catacomb as a true "4th century art gallery".

They were only in use for around fifty years, from the early 4th century until c.350-360 AD. Two parallel galleries, about 18 metres apart, are crossed at right angles by another gallery which ends in a series of cubiculi and crypts, which are the most interesting from the art historical and architectural point of view. The ancient entrance is now blocked by a recent overhanging structure - the modern entrance is through a manhole cover on the pavement of via Latina.

== External links (in Italian) ==
- Alberto Angela, Ulisse - Il piacere della scoperta: Roma sotto Roma: i segreti nascosti della città, Rai 3, 5 May 2018, at 00 h 15 min 30 s.
- Alessio Lo Conte. "Ipogeo di Via Dino Compagni". Roma Sotterranea.
- "Mappa dell'Ipogeo di via Dino Compagni". International Catacomb Society. Archived from the original on 12 April 2009.
- "Filmato della trasmissione SuperQuark sull'ipogeo di via Dino Compagni". YouTube.
