= Municipio VIII =

Coordinates: 41°53′35″N 12°28′58″E

Municipio VIII di Roma
- Municipio of Rome
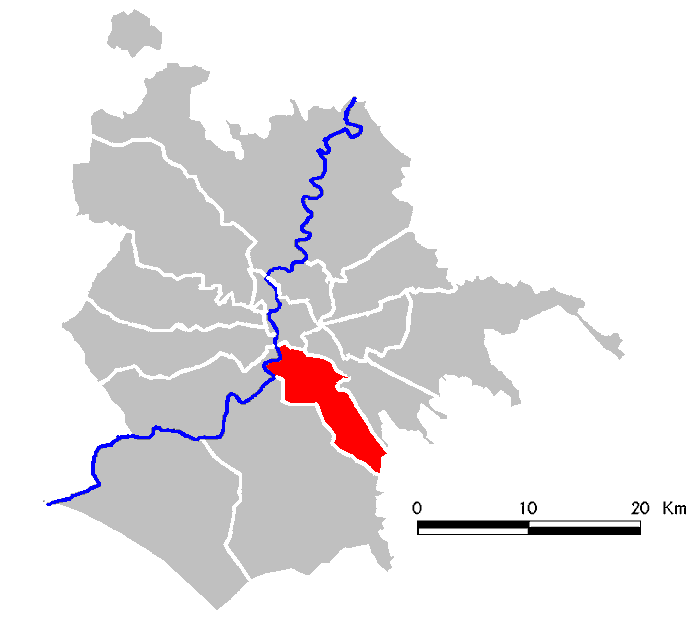
- Location of Municipio VIII of Rome
- Country: Italy
- Region: Lazio
- Comune: Rome
- Established: 19 January 2001; 11 March 2013 (renamed)

Government
  - President: Amedeo Ciaccheri (SI)

Area
  - Total: 1,826 sq mi (4,729 km^{2})

Population (2023)
  - Total: 130,089
  - Density: 7,184.1/sq mi (2,773.79/km^{2})
- Time zone: UTC+1 (CET)
  - Summer (DST): UTC+2 (CEST)
- Website: Municipio VIII of Rome

Municipio VIII is one of the 15 administrative subdivisions of the city of Rome, Italy.

It was first created by Rome's City Council on 19 January 2001 as Municipio XI and features a president who is elected during the mayoral elections. On 11 March 2013, following a municipal reorganization, its designation was officially changed to Municipio VIII.

== Subdivision ==
Municipio VIII is divided into 9 urban zones:

Urban zone	Population
11A. Ostiense	7,673
11B. Valco San Paolo	7,488
11C. Garbatella	43,601
11D. Navigatori	5,124
11E. Tor Marancia	33,026
11F. Tre Fontane	11,836
11G. Grottaperfetta	15,636
11X. Appia Antica North	2,641
11Y. Appia Antica South	755
Not localized	2,309
Total	130,089

== Municipal Government ==
The area has its own local authority called Consiglio di Municipio (Municipal Council), composed by a president and 25 members directly elected by citizens every five years. The council is responsible for most local services, such as schools, social services, waste collection, roads, parks, libraries and local commerce in the area, and manages funds (if any) provided by the city government for specific purposes, such as those intended to guarantee the right to education for poorer families.

The current president is Amedeo Ciaccheri (SI). He was elected in the 2021 Rome municipal election together with the 25-member Municipal Council, whose composition is shown below:

Alliance or political party	Members	
Alliance or political party	2021–2027	
Centre-left (PD-SI)	16	16 / 25
Brothers of Italy (FdI)	5	5 / 25
Action (A)	2	2 / 25
Five Star Movement (M5S)	2	2 / 25

Here is a list of presidents of the Municipio VIII since 2001:

President	Party	Coalition	Term of office	
Massimiliano Smeriglio	PRC	Centre-left	30 May 2001	30 May 2006
Andrea Catarci	PRC/SEL	Centre-left	30 May 2006	20 June 2016
Paolo Pace	M5S		20 June 2016	10 April 2017 (Note: Resigned.)
Special Commissioner (2017–2018)
Amedeo Ciaccheri	SI	Centre-left	10 June 2018	Incumbent

== Geography ==
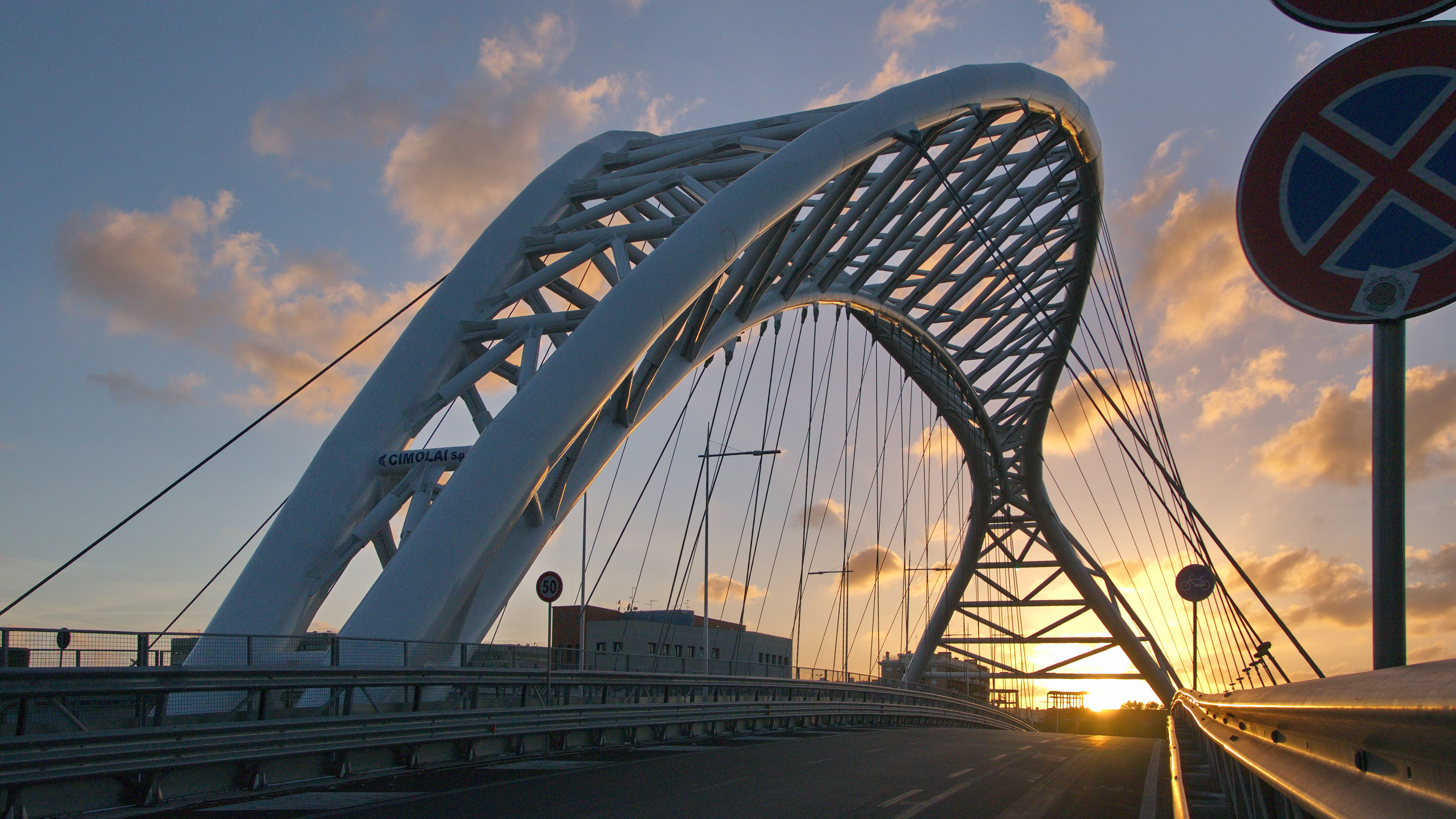
The iconic Settimia Spizzichino bridge between Ostiense and Garbatella is considered the symbol of Municipio VIII.

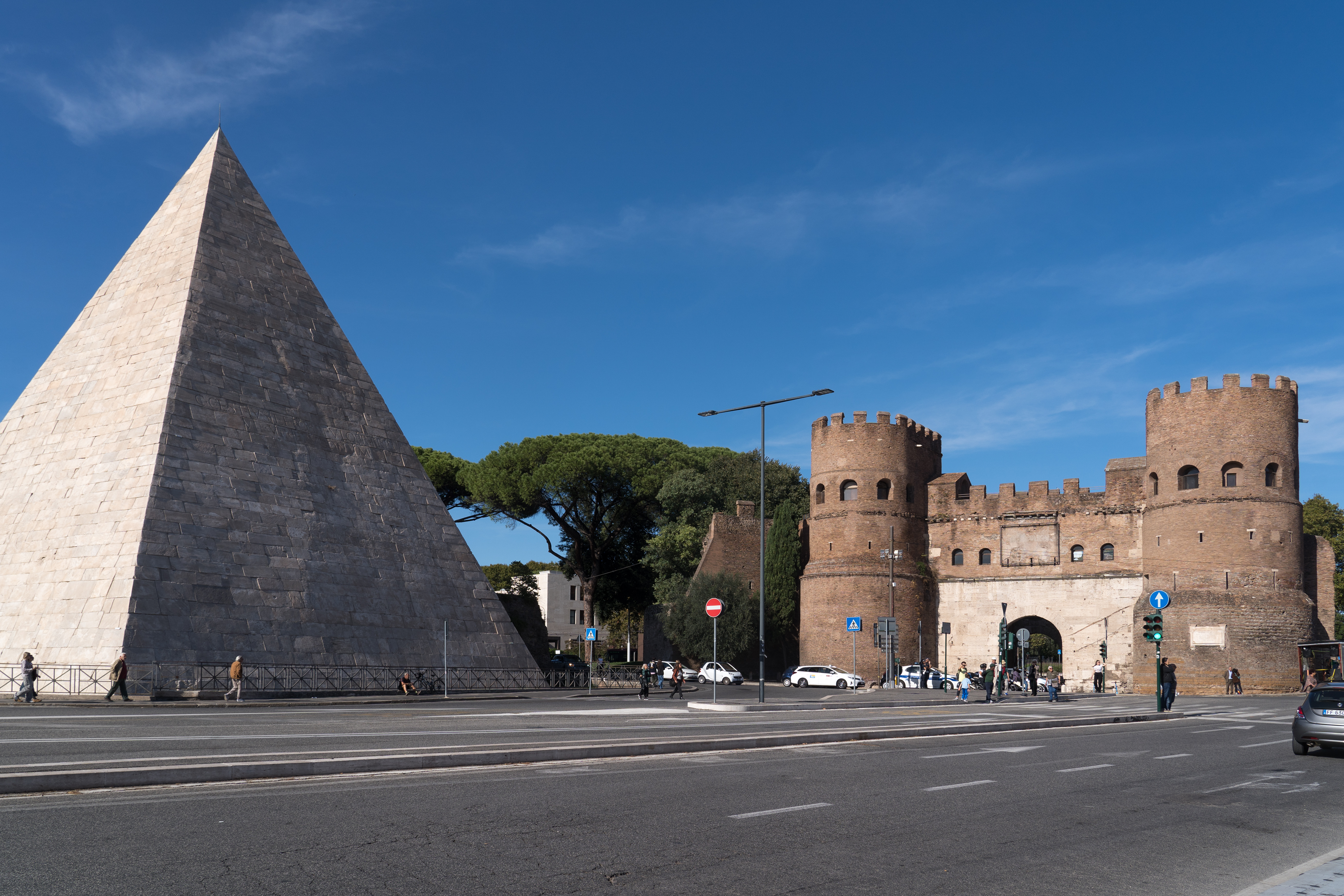
Porta San Paolo and the Pyramid of Cestius in Ostiense.

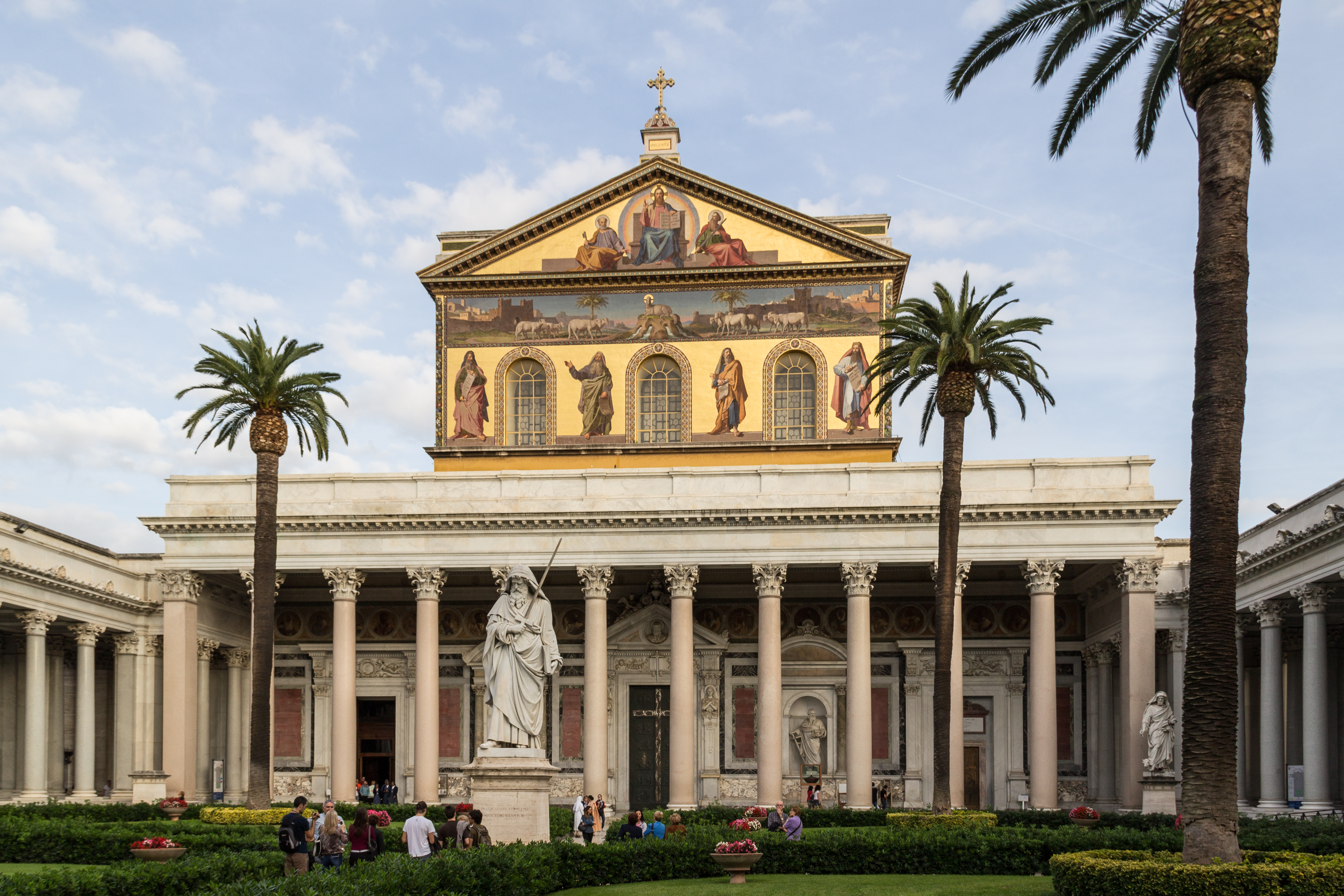
The Papal Basilica of Saint Paul Outside the Walls is considerate an extraterritoriality of the Holy See.

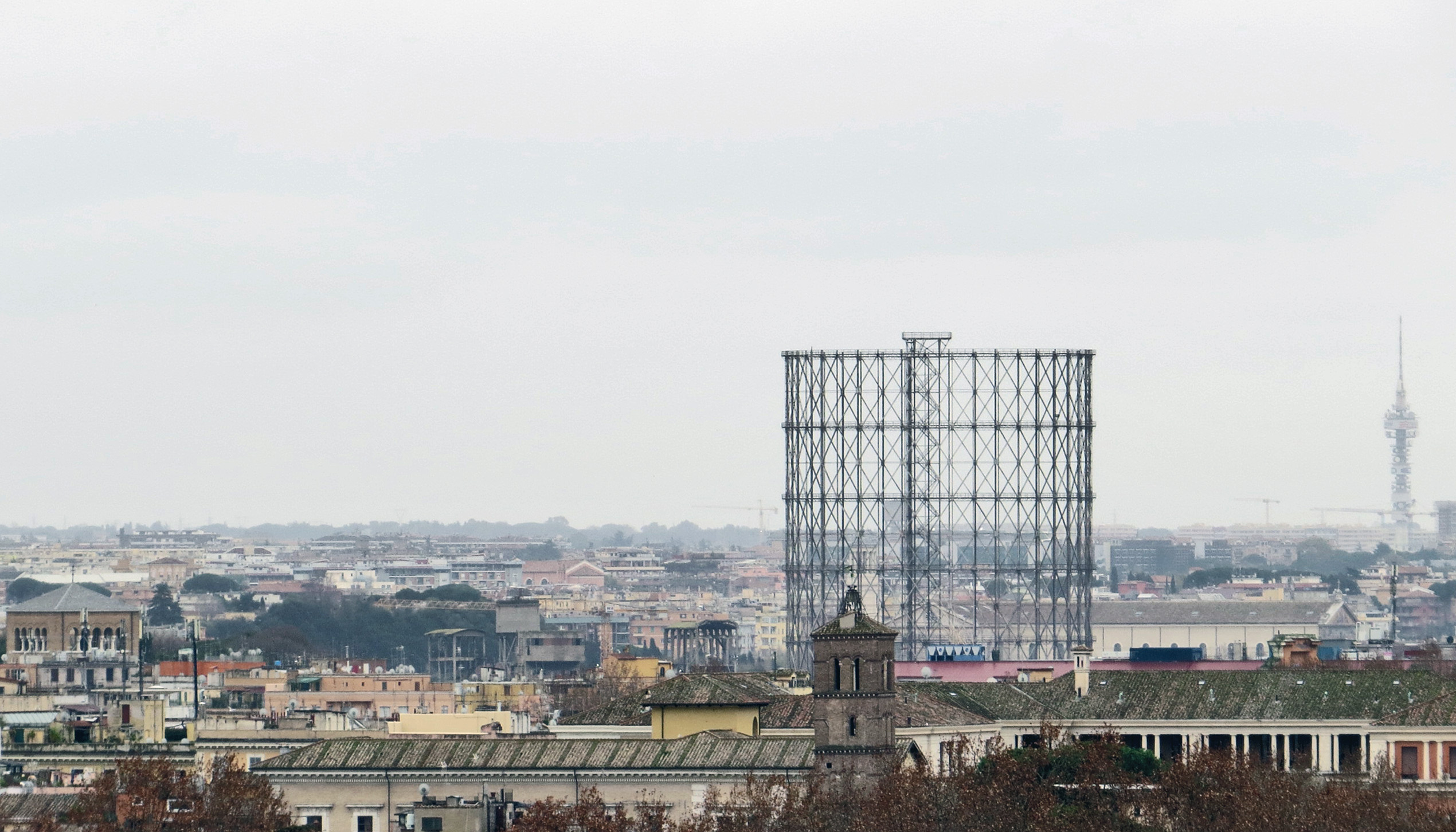
Gazometro of Rome (1937) in Ostiense is one of the most famous examples of industrial archaeology.

The territory of Municipio VIII extends across the southern quadrant of Rome, covering an area of 47.23 square kilometers and acting as a transition zone between the city's historic center and its southern suburban expansion. Its geographical boundaries are defined by a mix of natural elements, ancient infrastructure, and modern transport lines. To the north, the boundary is marked by the Aurelian Walls near Porta San Paolo and Piazzale Ostiense, separating the district from Municipio I. The western border is naturally formed by the urban course of the Tiber, which divides Municipio VIII from Municipio XI, running along the Marconi and Ostiense districts. To the east, the boundary follows the valley of the Caffarella Park and the initial stretch of the Via Appia Antica, bordering Municipio VII. Topographically, the landscape is characterized by the low alluvial plains near the riverbanks and the typical Roman tuff hills, such as those hosting the historic garden-city of Garbatella, alongside heavily urbanized areas like San Paolo and Montagnola, and vast protected green zones like Tor Marancia.

=== Ostiense ===
The Ostiense district is located in the northern area of Municipio VIII, positioned immediately outside the ancient city walls of Rome. Topographically, the district occupies a flat alluvial valley formed by the slow loop of the Tiber, a geographical element that historically favored its development as an industrial and logistical hub for the capital. The boundaries of Ostiense are strictly defined by both natural and man-made infrastructure. To the north, the quarter is separated from the historic center (rione Testaccio and rione San Saba) by the layout of the Aurelian Walls, stretching between Porta San Paolo and the Campo Boario area. Its western border is entirely formed by the path of the Tiber, which separates Ostiense from the Portuense and Gianicolense quarters, while its southern limit extends down to Via delle Sette Chiese and the massive complex of the Basilica of Saint Paul Outside the Walls. To the east, the district's boundary runs along the historical route of the Via Ostiense and the Rome-Lido railway line, which divides it from the neighboring Garbatella and Tor Marancia areas, creating a highly interconnected urban corridor.

=== Garbatella ===
Garbatella represents one of the most distinctive urban anomalies in Rome, dualistic in its classification as both a historic neighborhood and an official administrative entity. Geographically, it is located within the northern section of Municipio VIII, sitting on a system of rolling tuff hills adjacent to the Basilica of Saint Paul Outside the Walls. While the layperson colloquially refers to it as a "quartiere," it legally constitutes Urban Zone 11C and sits entirely inside the broader, official limits of the Ostiense district.

The physical boundaries of Garbatella are carved out by massive infrastructural barriers and historical thoroughfares. Its western perimeter is bounded by the route of the Via Ostiense and the parallel Rome-Lido railway line, which isolates the neighborhood from the heavy industrial docks of the Tiber River. To the east, the neighborhood is strictly framed by the massive transit corridor of Via Cristoforo Colombo, which separates it from the Appia Antica system and the Tor Marancia zone. Its northern frontier is defined by the Circonvallazione Ostiense and the Settimia Spizzichino bridge, while the southern boundary tapers off along the ancient pilgrimage route of Via delle Sette Chiese. This precise insulation allowed the core area to develop its iconic, insular "Garden City" layout—consisting of private, low-rise architectural blocks or "lotti" grouped around shared courtyards—which stands in stark contrast to the surrounding dense, high-rise urban expansion.

The historical origin of Garbatella is deeply connected to the industrial development of Rome during the early twentieth century, specifically linked to the construction of the river port in the adjacent Ostiense district. On 18 February 1920, King Victor Emmanuel III laid the foundation stone at Piazza Benedetto Brin, officially initiating a project spearheaded by the Istituto Case Popolari (ICP) under the guidance of Alberto Calza Bini. The initial societal objective was to provide affordable, decent housing for the working-class families employed in the nearby maritime harbor and factories, drawing inspiration from Ebenezer Howard's British "Garden City" movement. However, the demographic nature of the neighborhood shifted dramatically following the Fascist regime's urban demolitions in the historic center of Rome during the late 1920s; the newly displaced families from rioni like Borgo and Monti were mass-relocated to Garbatella, forcing the sudden construction of large-scale collective housing blocks, such as the iconic "Alberghi Suburbani" (Suburban Hotels).

From an architectural standpoint, Garbatella serves as an open-air museum for the "Barocchetto Romano," a unique stylistic compromise engineered by prominent architects and urban planners of the era, including Gustavo Giovannoni, Innocenzo Sabbatini, and Costantino Costantini. This style rejected the cold, monotonous geometry of traditional working-class tenements, opting instead for low-rise, organic residential units known as "lotti" that harmonized with the natural curves of the tuff hills. The buildings feature an eclectic mix of elements borrowed from Roman Renaissance, Baroque, and medieval vernacular traditions, utilizing affordable yet highly decorative plasterwork, friezes, stuccoes, and whimsical moldings representing local flora and fauna. The core layout is centered around shared, semi-private inner courtyards and public gardens, which were designed not only to maximize natural light and ventilation but also to deliberately foster a tight-knit communal lifestyle among the residents, a social fabric that remains exceptionally vibrant to this day.

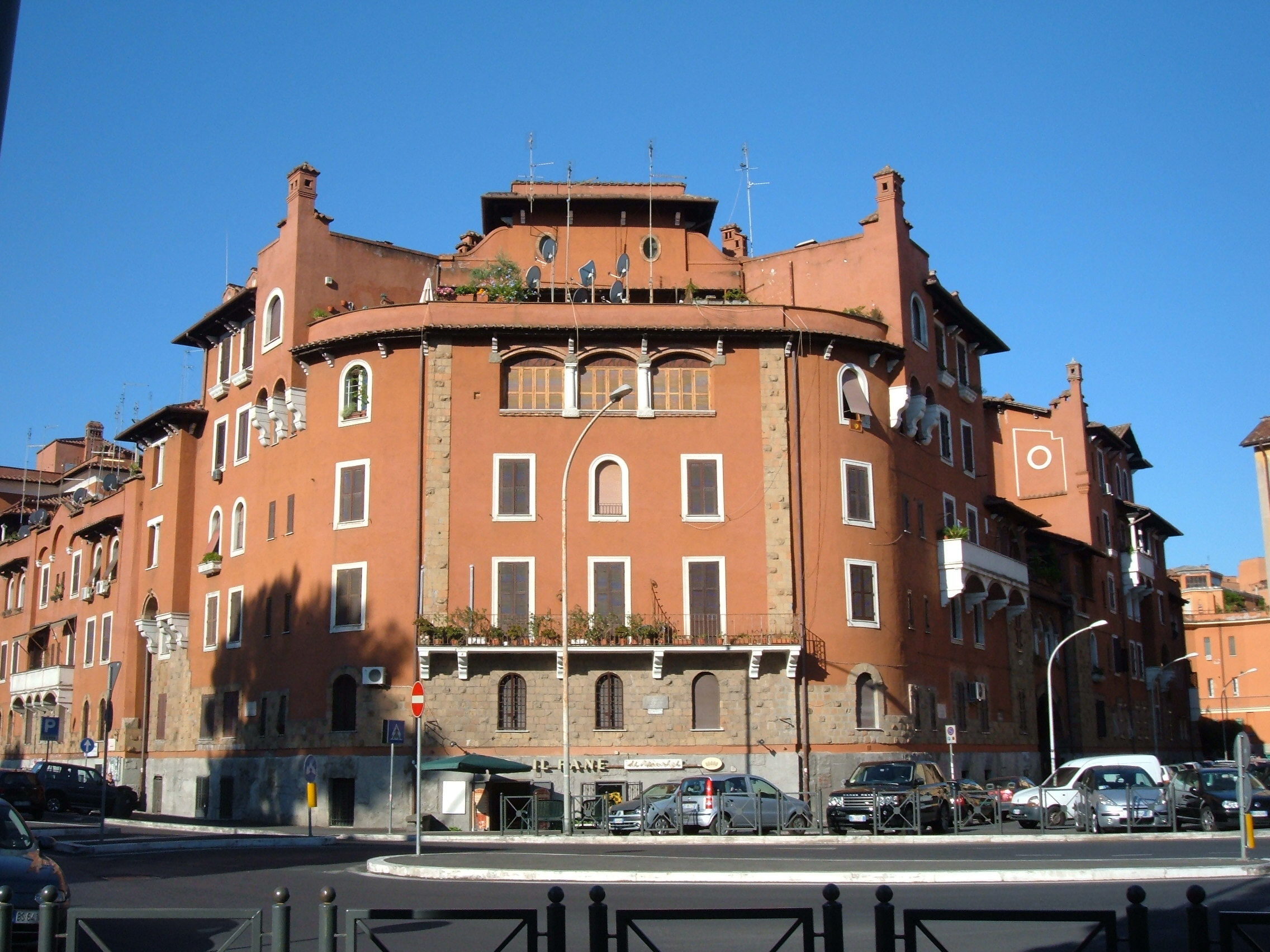
Suburban Hotel in Garbatella

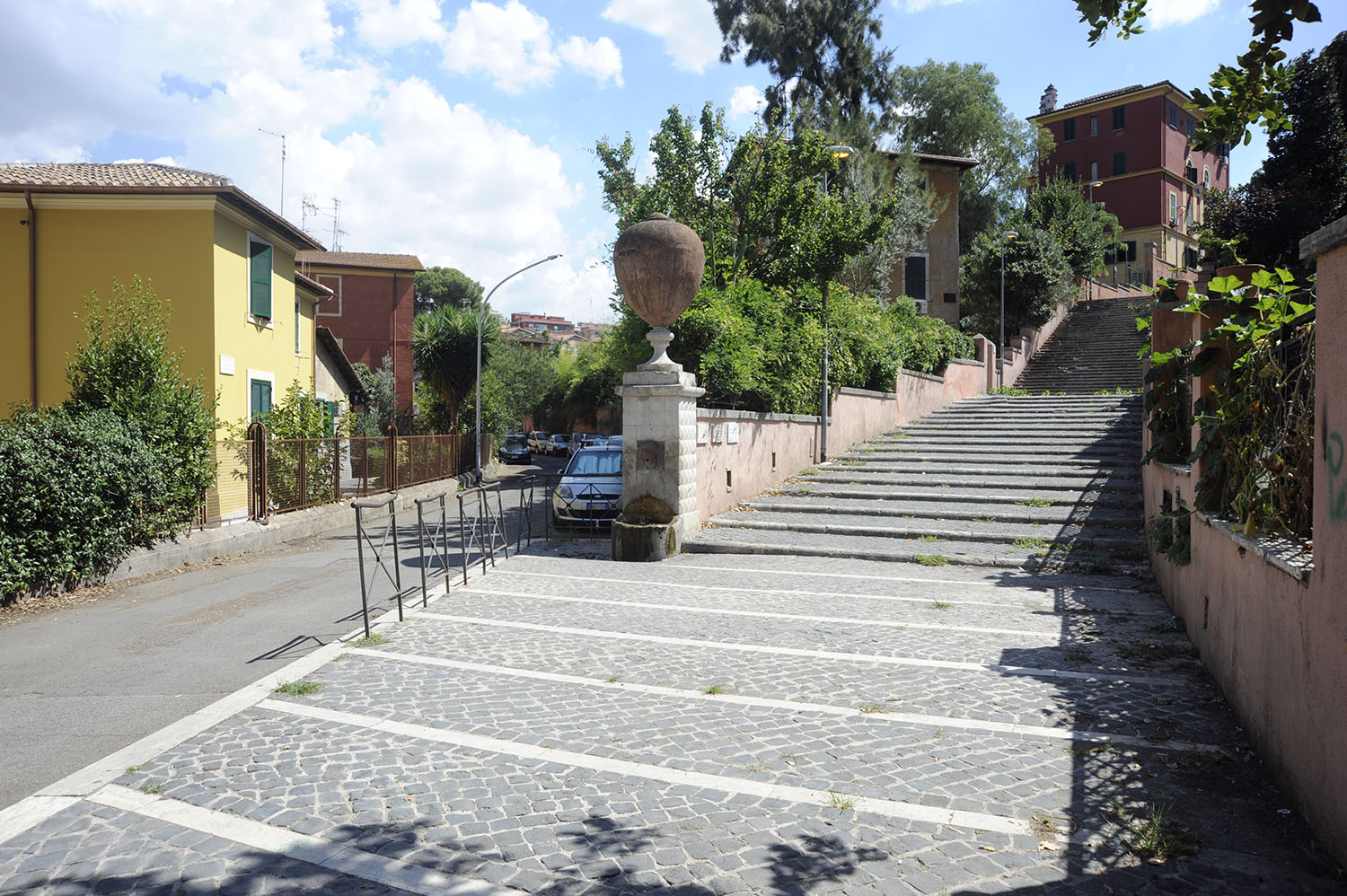
The Lovers' Staircase

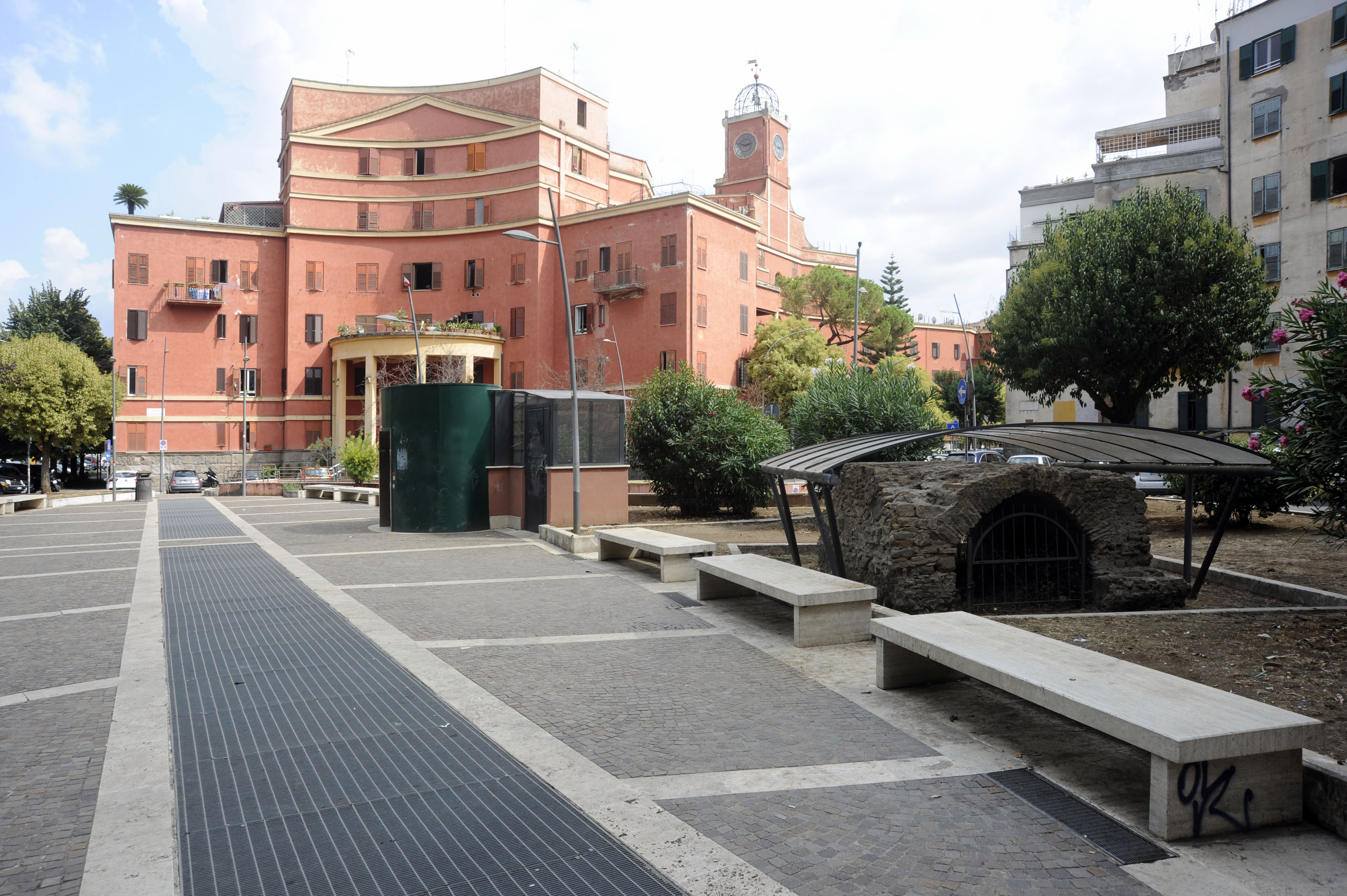
Public square and Suburban Hotel in Garbatella

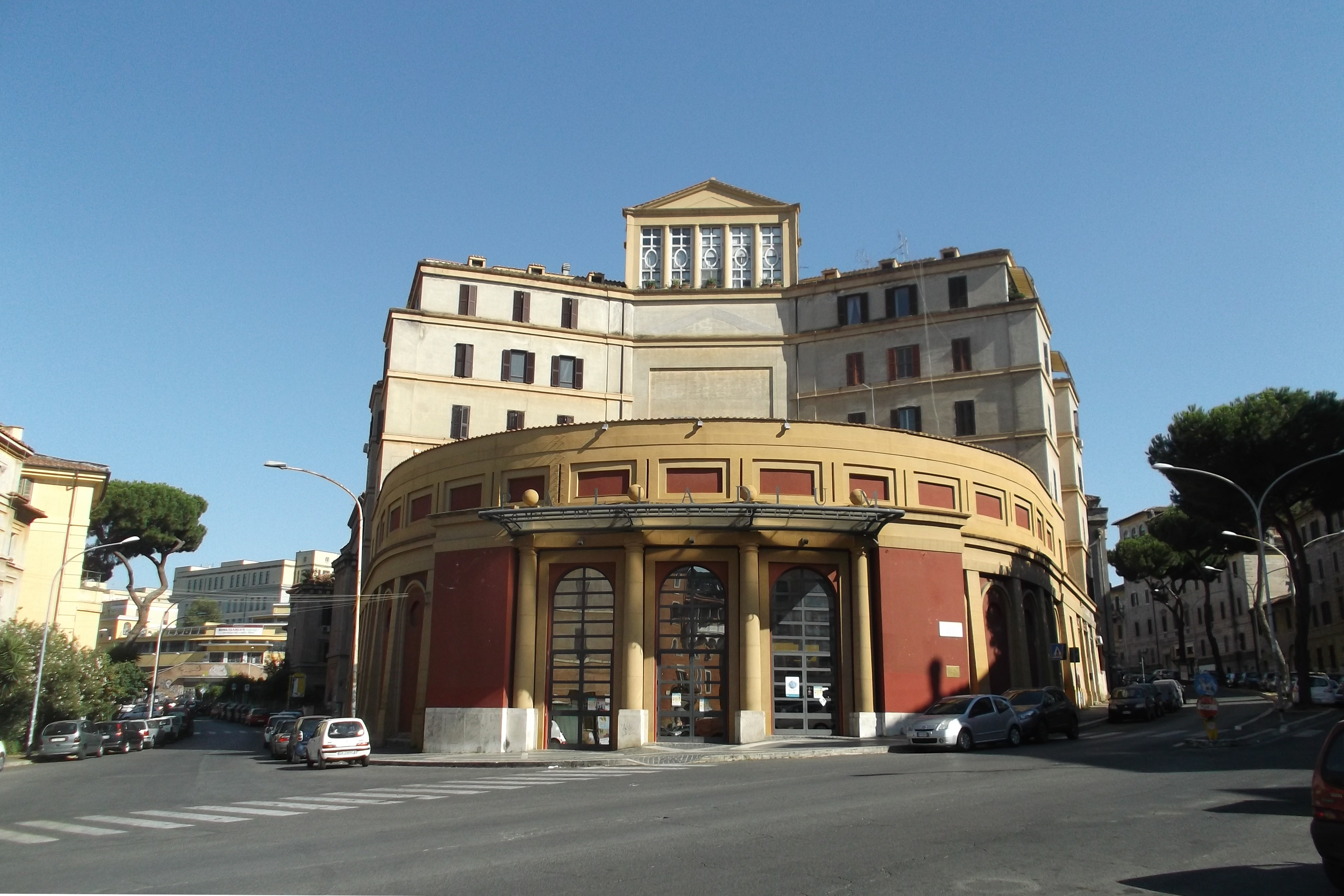
Palladium Theatre

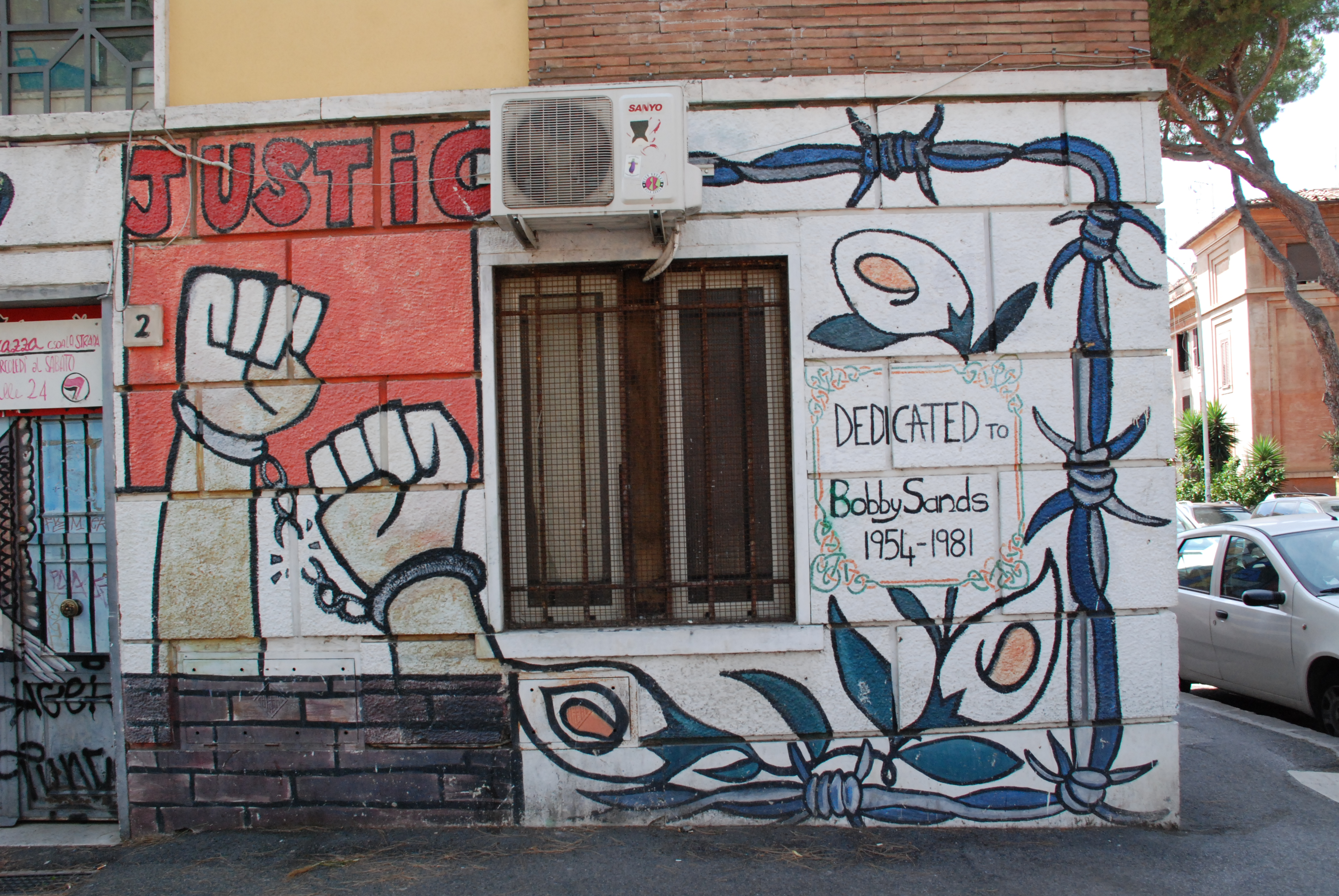
Typical street art in Garbatella

=== Appia Antica ===
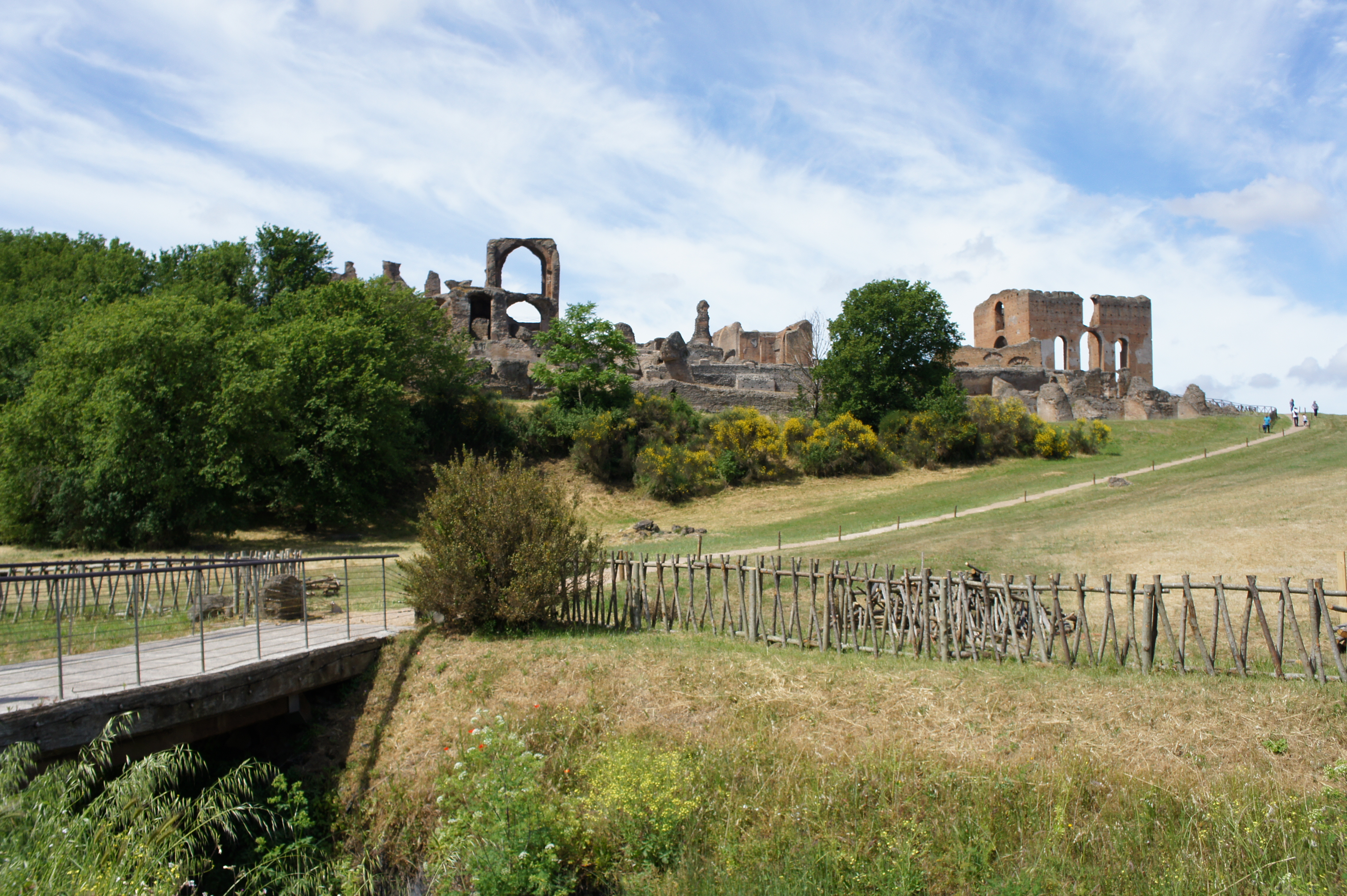
Appian Way Regional Park.

The easternmost boundary of Municipio VIII is defined by the initial stretch of the Via Appia Antica, historically renowned as the "Regina Viarum" (Queen of Roads), which was originally laid out in 312 BC by the censor Appius Claudius Caecus. Within the context of modern municipal geography, this ancient infrastructural axis separates the urban zones of Municipio VIII from the dense residential quarters of Municipio VII, acting as a protected green buffer and a monumental open-air museum. Topographically, the road runs parallel to the alluvial valley of the Caffarella, traversing a landscape dominated by volcanic pozzolana and tuff formations deposited by the ancient Latium Volcano.

This specific municipal sector contains an extraordinary density of archaeological and sepulchral monuments that reflect the ancient Roman law prohibiting burials within the city walls. Near the northern apex, where the road originates close to the Aurelian Walls and Porta San Sebastiano, lies the complex of the Catacombs of Saint Callixtus, a massive underground cemetery network that serves as the official burial site for early popes. Moving further south along the municipal border, the ancient paved stones lead to the monumental complex of Maxentius, which encompasses the imperial palace, the remarkably preserved Circus of Maxentius, and the dynastic Mausoleum of Romulus. Immediately adjacent to this complex stands the iconic Tomb of Caecilia Metella, a circular concrete and travertine mausoleum that was later transformed into a medieval fortified castle (the Caetani Castrum), showcasing how the physical geography of the Appia Antica shifted from a sacred funerary highway to a strategic military bottleneck guarding the southern access to Rome.

== Education ==
=== Higher Education ===
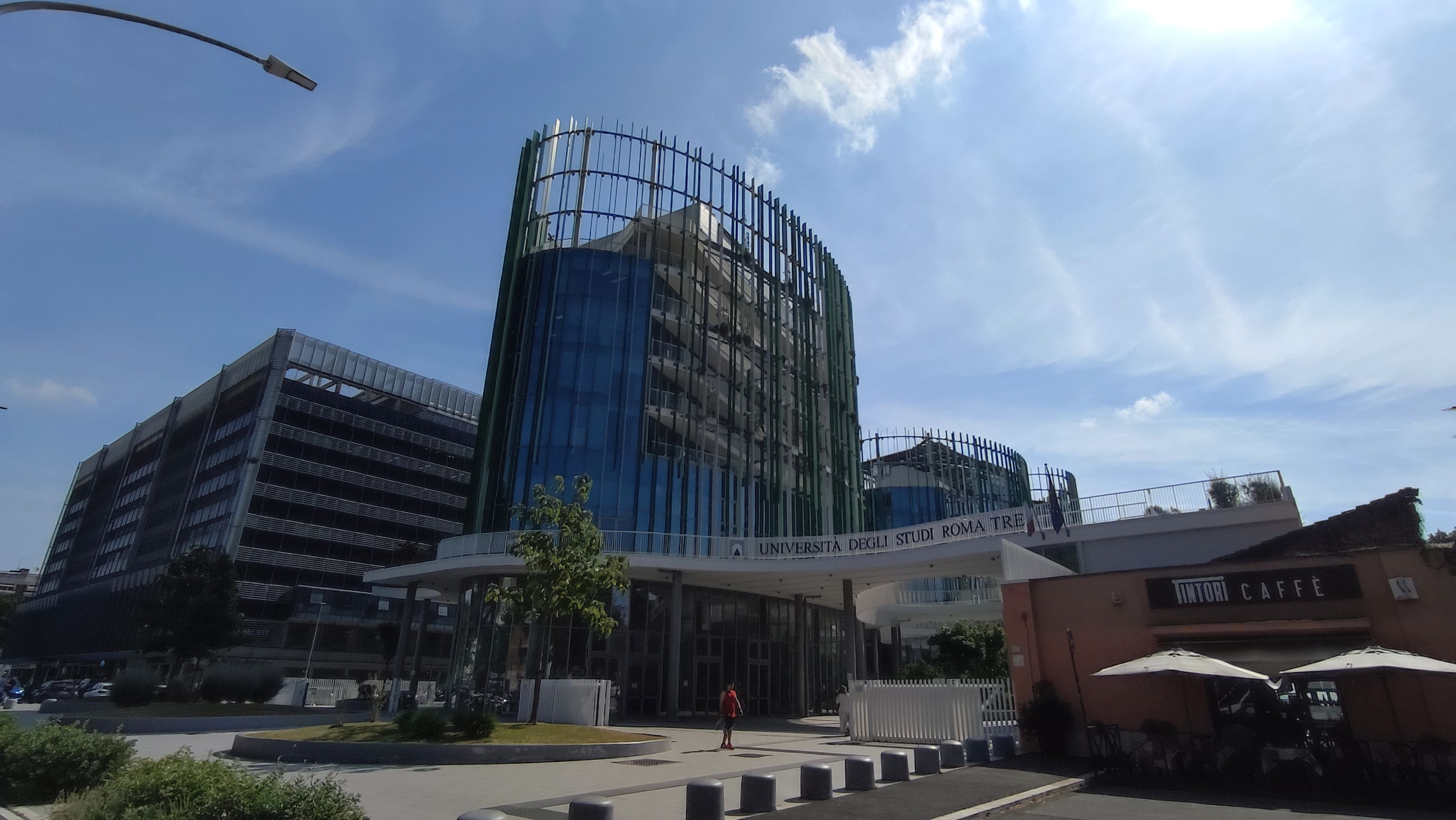
Roma Tre University campus.

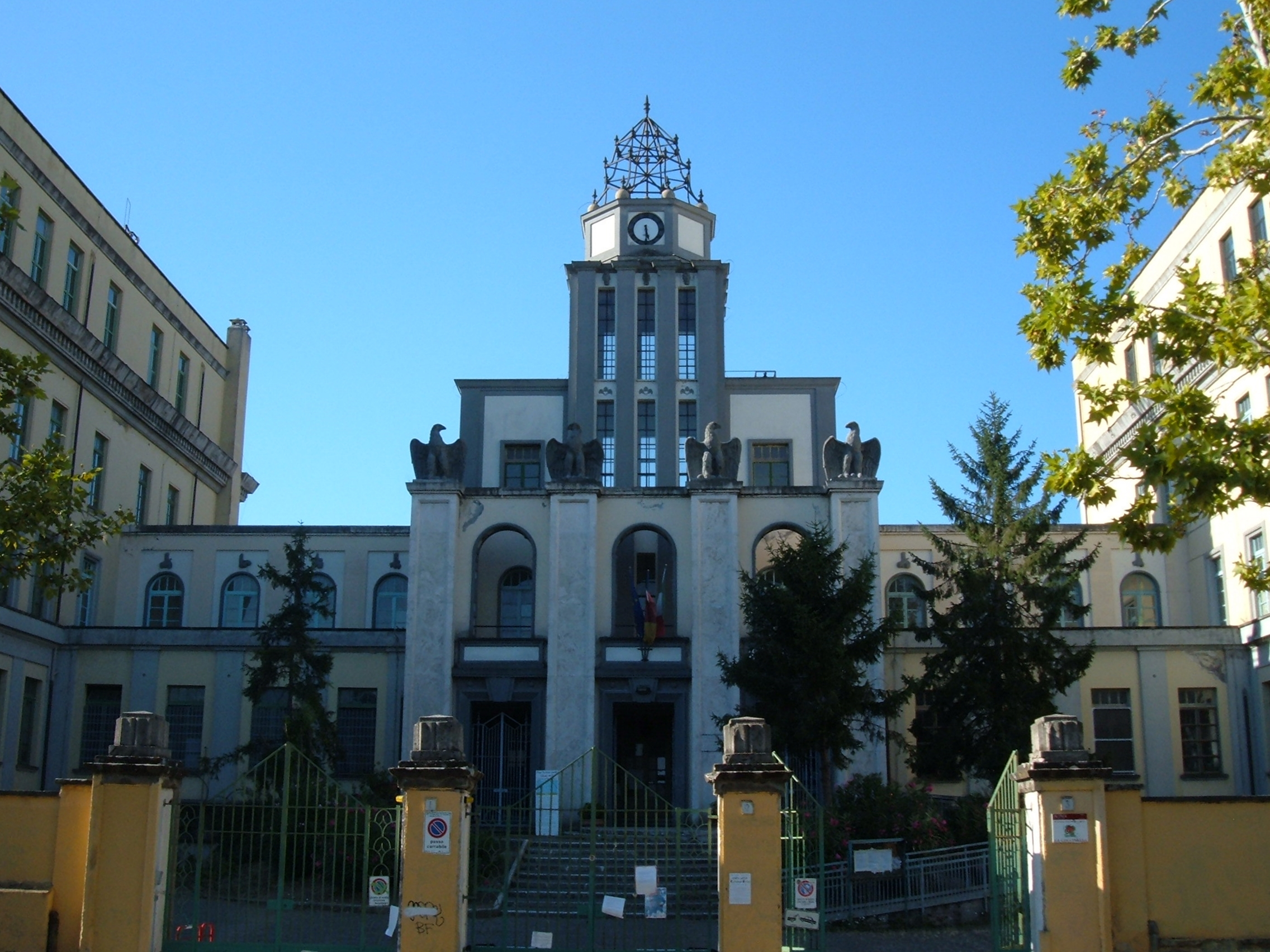
Public school in Garbatella.

The territory of Municipio VIII hosts a dense concentration of high schools and public university facilities. One of the universities in the area is the Roma Tre University (Università degli Studi Roma Tre), which was founded in 1992.

== Culture ==
=== Public Libraries ===
The public library network within Municipio VIII provides essential cultural services, research facilities, and community spaces.

- Biblioteca Joyce-Lussu – Located in the San Paolo area near Villa Certosa, this library specializes in modern literature, gender studies, and intercultural projects, offering large reading rooms and hosting frequent public book presentations.
- Biblioteca Hub Culturale Garbatella – Situated within the historic core of the Garbatella garden-city, this innovative space combines traditional lending services with digital co-working areas, focusing heavily on local history, urban planning archives, and civic community workshops.
- Biblioteca Area Umanistica (Roma Tre) – While primarily a university infrastructure located along Via Ostiense, this academic library opens its consultation spaces to the local public.

=== Museums ===
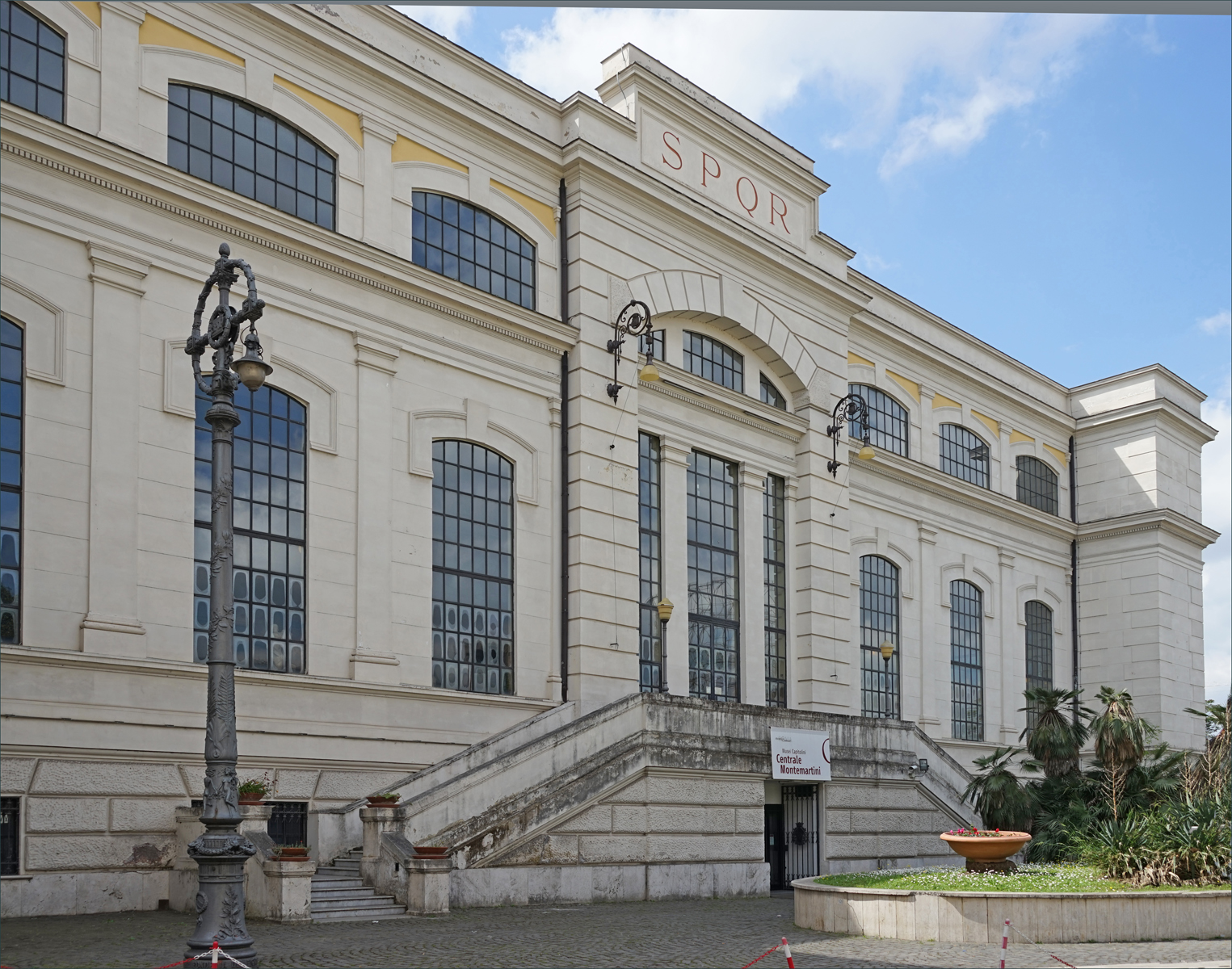
Centrale Montemartini in Via Ostiense.

==== Centrale Montemartini ====
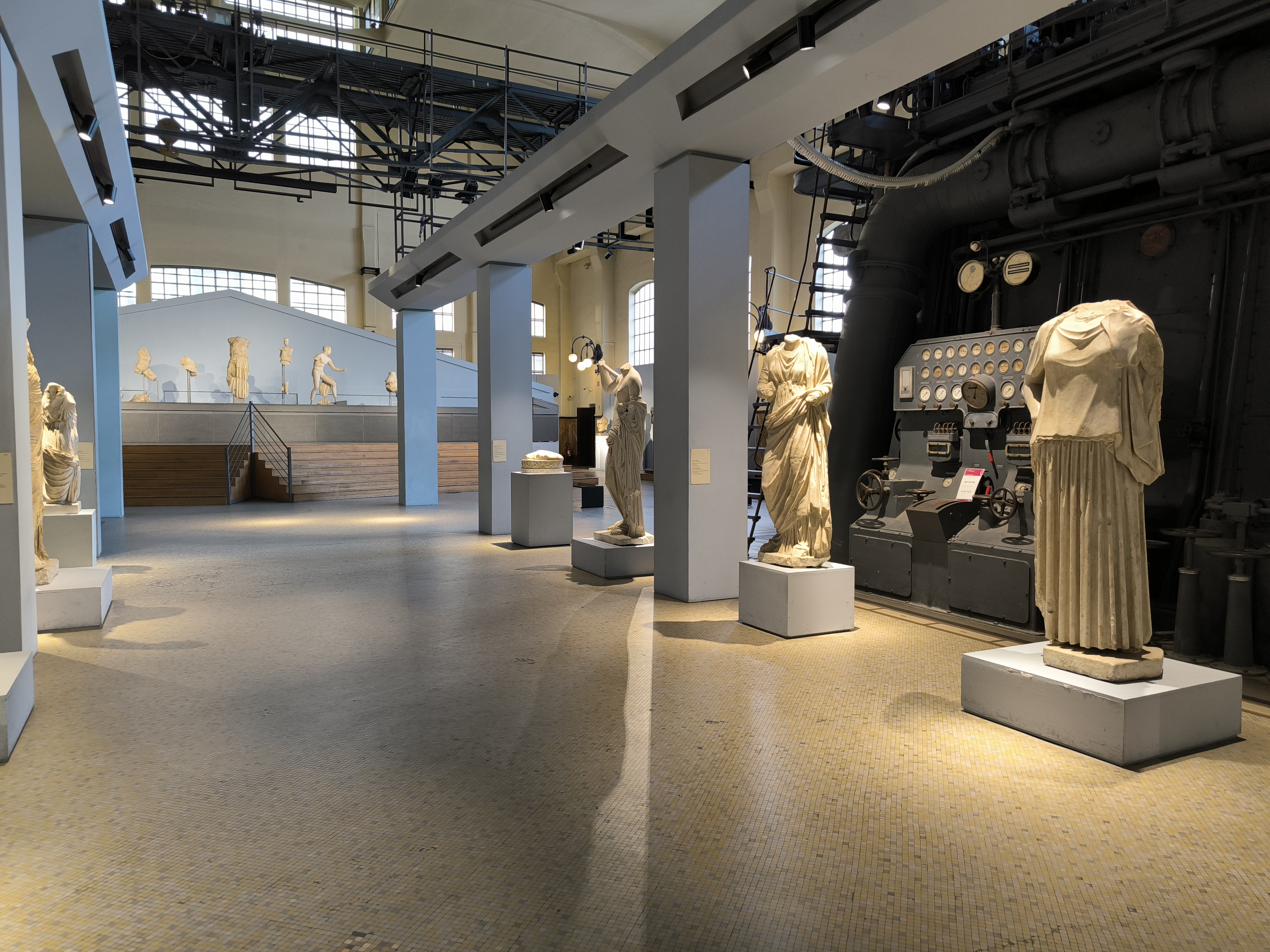
Centrale Montemartini exhibition.

The Centrale Montemartini is located along Via Ostiense. The complex originally opened in 1912 as Rome's very first public thermoelectric power plant, named after Giovanni Montemartini, an economist and theorist of municipal public services.

The building's architectural fate changed dramatically in 1997, when it was selected to temporarily host a massive collection of ancient Roman sculptures during the structural renovation of the main Capitoline complexes on the Capitoline Hill. The collection would later be permanently hosted in the building.

== Transport ==
Stations of Rome Metro in the Municipio VIII are:

- Piramide, Garbatella, Basilica San Paolo, Marconi.

Stations of Lazio regional railways in the Municipio II are:

- Roma Ostiense
- Roma Ostiense
- Roma Ostiense

Other major infrastructures are:

- Roma Ostiense railway station – It serves as one of the largest railway station in Rome.

== Public parks ==
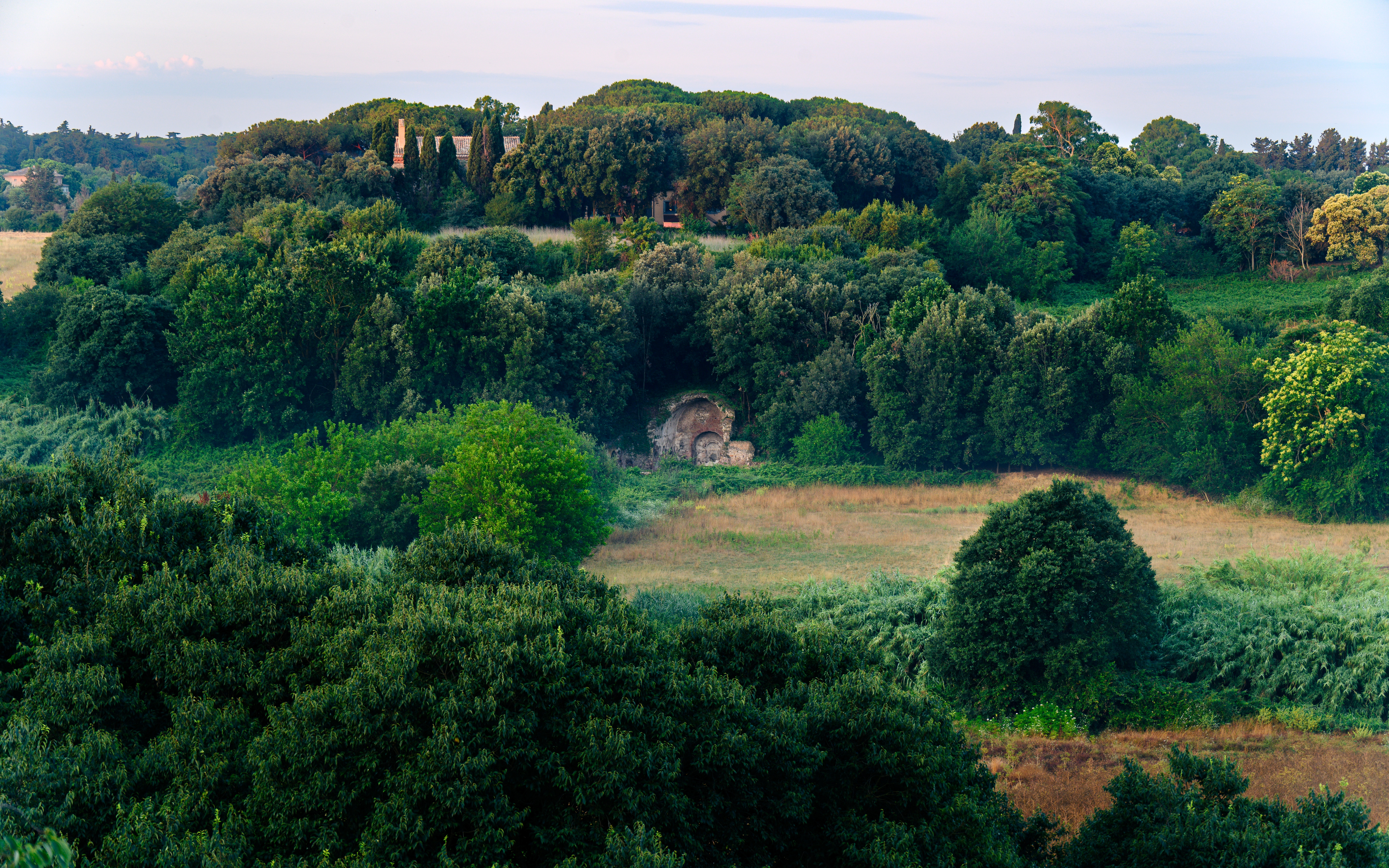
Park of the Caffarella.

The territory of Municipio VIII features an exceptional wealth of green spaces, acting as one of the primary ecological lungs of Rome by blending vast natural landscapes with protected archaeological environments. While the broader regional reserve of the Appian Way connects this area to neighboring districts—including the famous Parco degli Acquedotti which sits entirely further east within the borders of Municipio VII—the green infrastructure within the strict administrative boundaries of Municipio VIII provides vital regional biodiversity sanctuaries.

- Parco della Caffarella – Sprawling across the eastern border, this massive alluvial valley represents one of the largest urban parks in Europe, containing functioning historic farms, the Almone river, and unique wildlife habitats alongside Roman ruins.
- Tenuta di Tor Marancia – This protected area covers over 200 hectares of raw Roman countryside inside the city, featuring dense oak woodlands, ancient Roman villas, and natural valleys that were saved from building speculation through public preservation movements.
- Parco di Commodilla – Located in the heart of the San Paolo district, this urban park serves as an essential neighborhood garden and rests directly on top of the ancient Catacombs of Commodilla, blending daily community recreation with underground historical heritage.
- Parco Schuster – Situated immediately adjacent to the Basilica of Saint Paul Outside the Walls, this large lawned park serves as a highly popular social gathering spot for university students and families, hosting cultural events, concerts, and local civilian memorials.

== Gallery ==
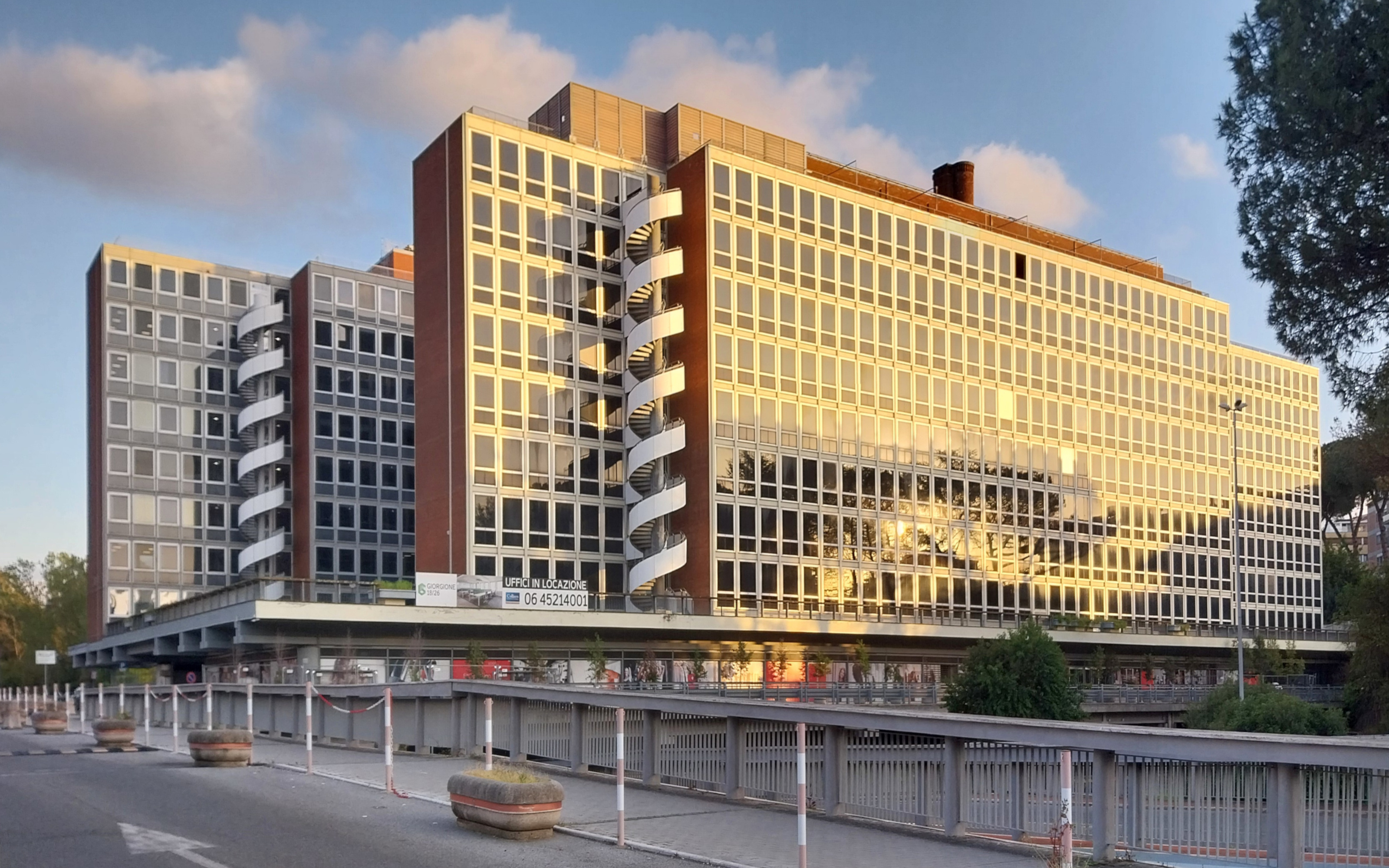
Business Centre in Appio-Latino

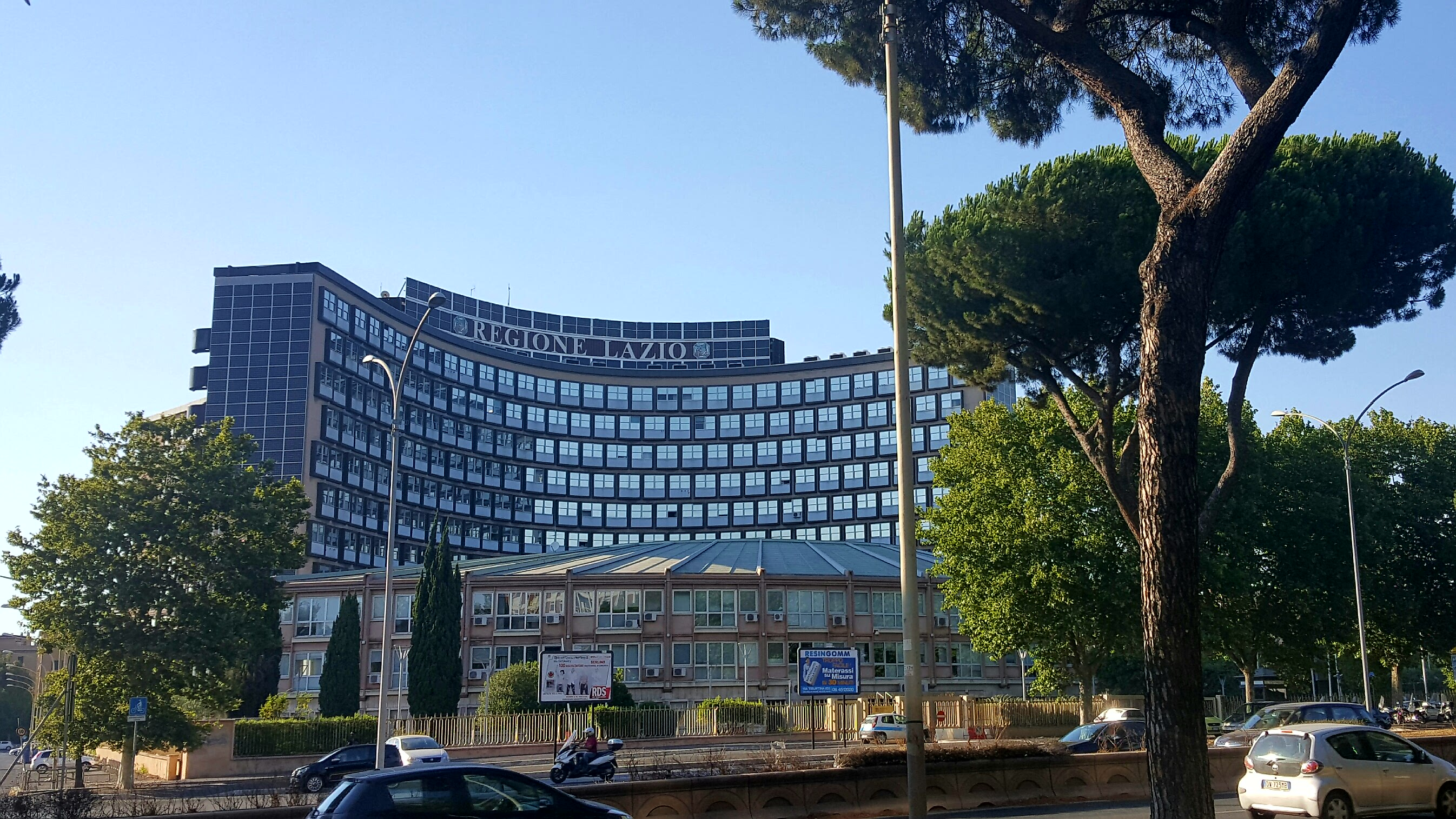
Seat of Regional Government of Lazio

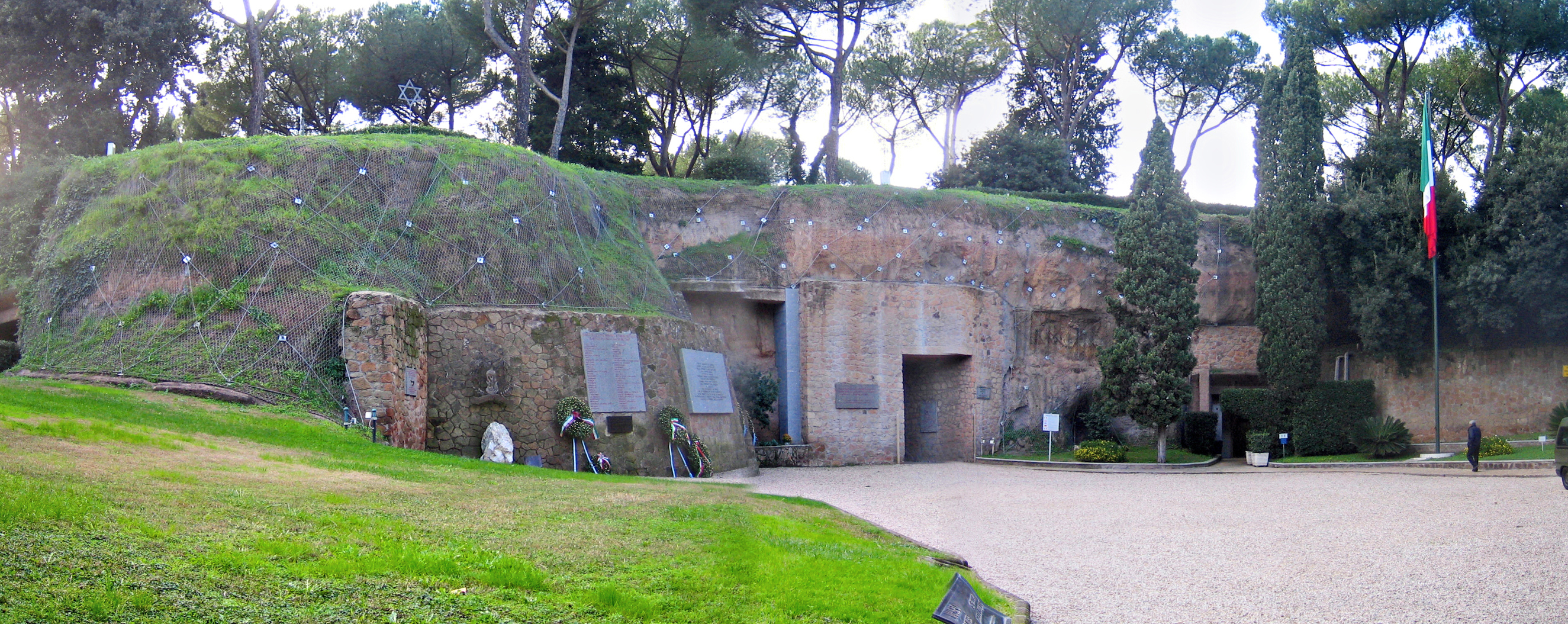
Ardeatine massacre monument

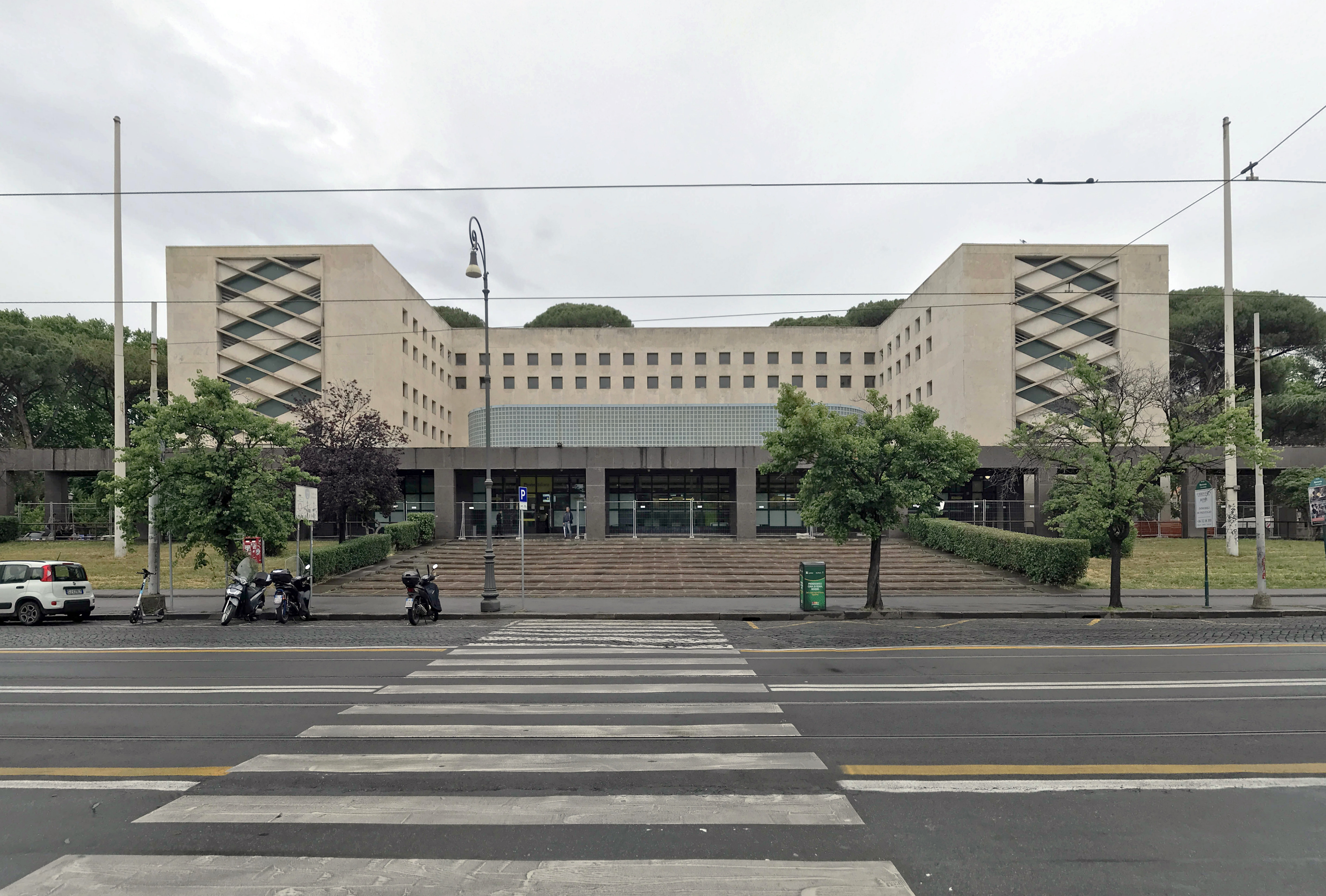
Ostiense post office

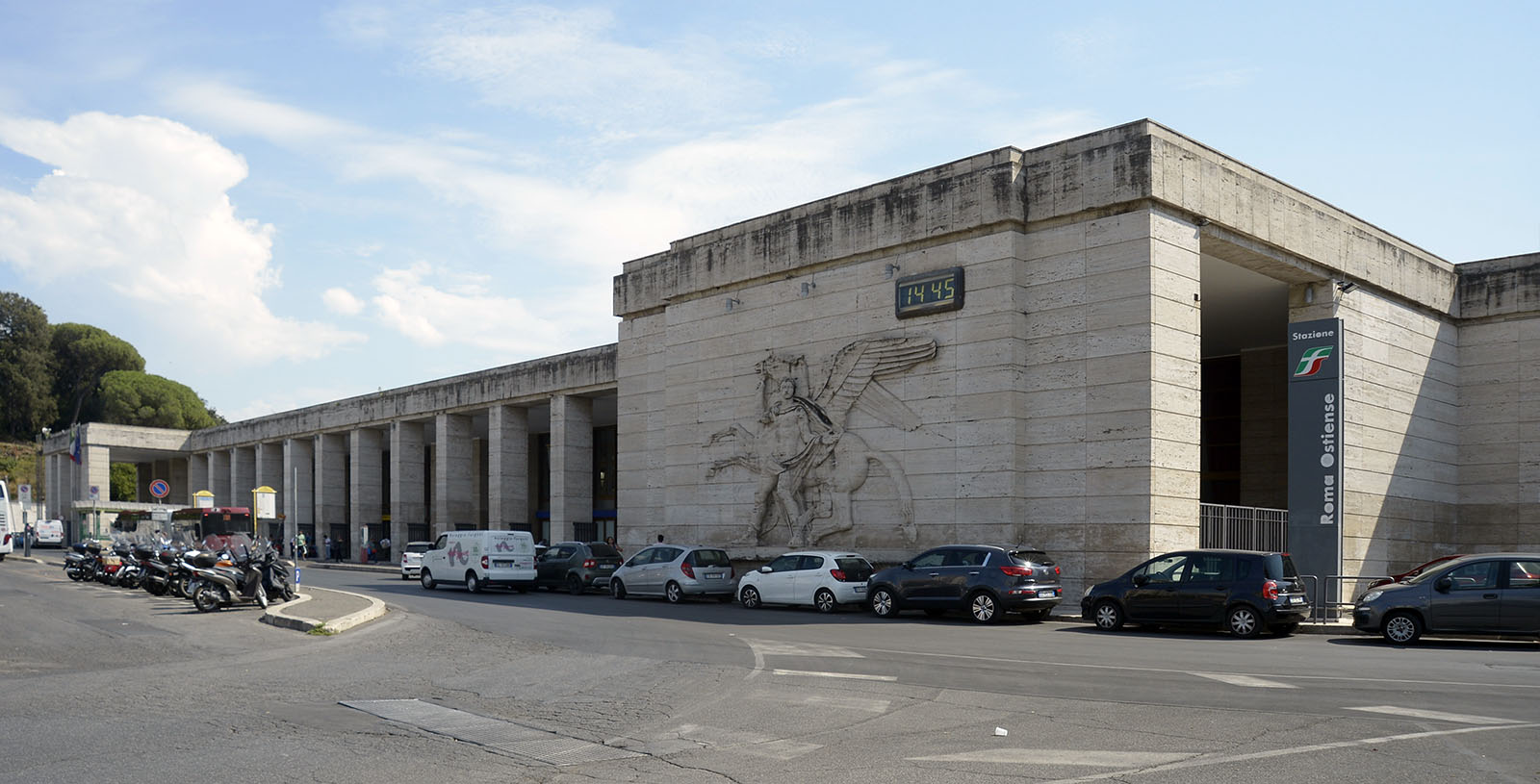
Roma Ostiense railway station
