= Baldo degli Ubaldi (Rome Metro) =

Rome metro station

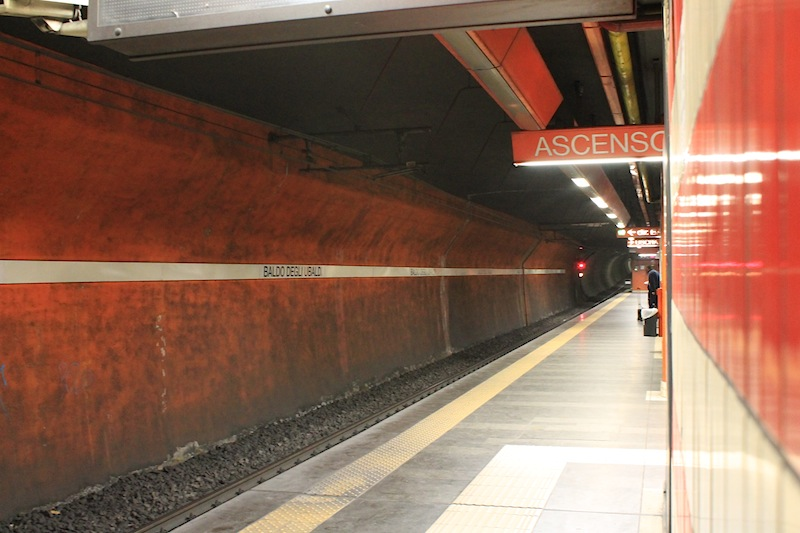

General information
- Coordinates: 41°53′56″N 12°25′58″E
- Owner: ATAC
- Platforms: 1 island platform
- Tracks: 2

Construction
- Structure type: Underground

History
- Opened: 1 January 2000; 26 years ago

Services
Preceding station	Rome Metro	Following station
Cornelia towards Battistini	Line A	Valle Aurelia towards Anagnina
Location
- Click on the map to see marker

Baldo degli Ubaldi is a station on Line A of the Rome Metro, situated on Via Baldo degli Ubaldi, near the crossroads with Via Bonaventura Cerretti. The station was inaugurated, along with the others between Valle Aurelia and Battistini, was inaugurated on 1 January 2000.

== Services ==
This station has:

- Access for the disabled.
- Escalators

== Located nearby ==
- Istituto Dermatologico dell'Immacolata
