= Subaugusta (Rome Metro) =

Rome metro station

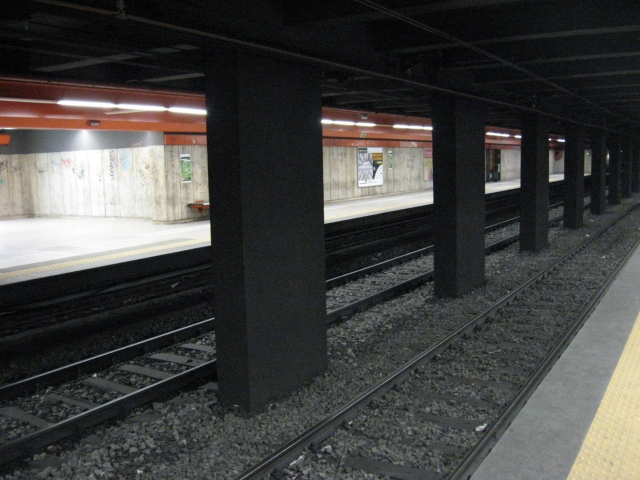

General information
- Coordinates: 41.8535°N 12.5682°E
- Owner: ATAC
- Line: Line A
- Platforms: Side platforms

Construction
- Structure type: Underground

Services
Preceding station	Rome Metro	Following station
Giulio Agricola towards Battistini	Line A	Cinecittà towards Anagnina
Location
- Click on the map to see marker

Subaugusta is an underground station on Line A of the Rome Metro. This station in located in Piazza di Cinecittà, at the intersection of Via Tuscolana with Viale Tito Labieno and Via Orazio Pulvillo.
