= Giulio Agricola (Rome Metro) =

Rome metro station

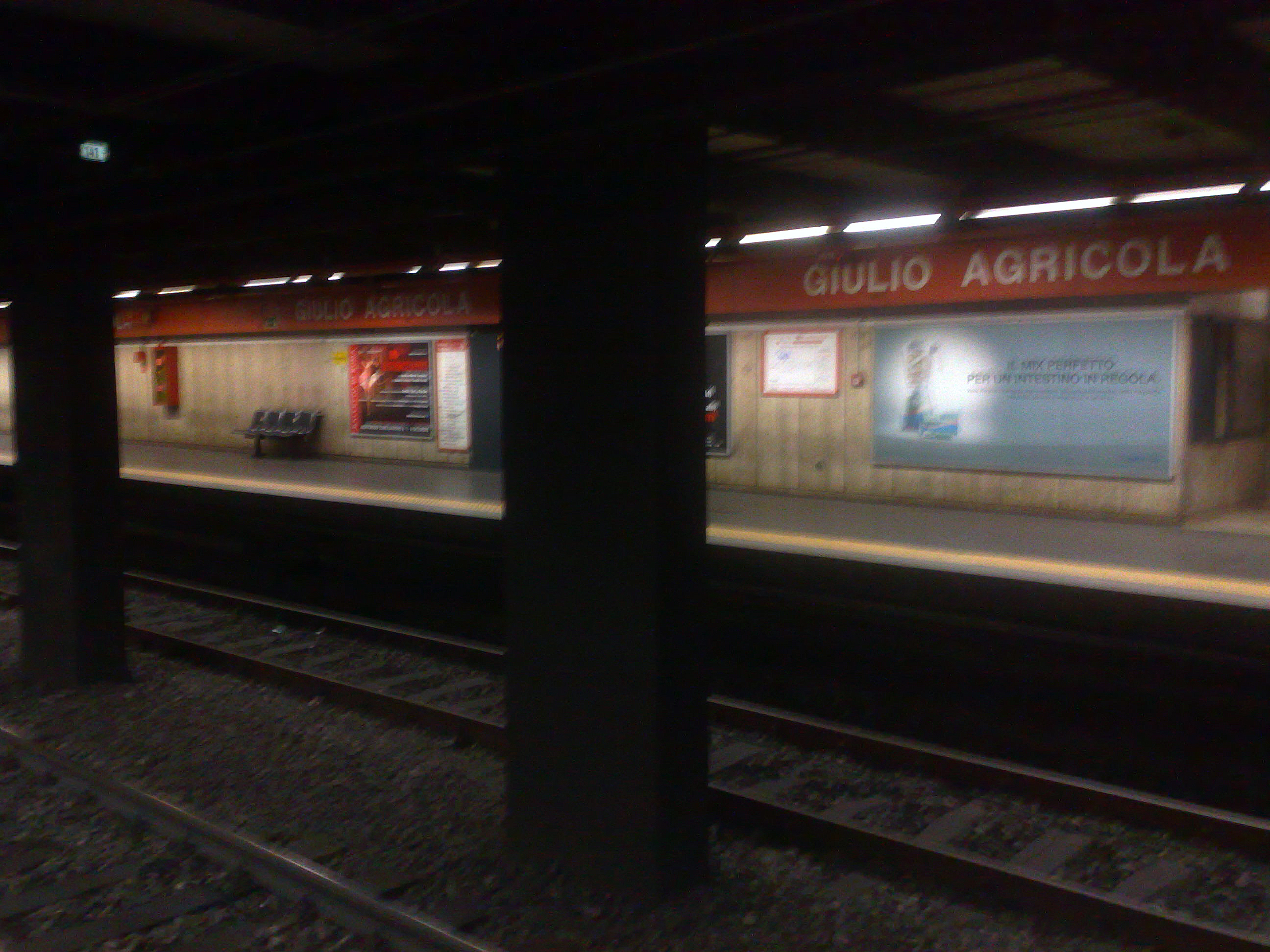

General information
- Location: Via Tuscolana, Rome
- Coordinates: 41°51′24″N 12°33′45″E
- Owner: ATAC

Construction
- Structure type: Underground

Services
| Preceding station | Rome Metro | Following station |
|---|---|---|
| Lucio Sestio towards Battistini | Line A | Subaugusta towards Anagnina |
Location
- Click on the map to see marker

Giulio Agricola is an underground station on Line A of the Rome Metro. It is located on Via Tuscolana, on the junction with Viale Giulio Agricola and Viale Marco Fulvio Nobiliore, in an area where roads and squares are named after Roman commanders and consuls.

== History ==
The construction of Line A around the Giulio Agricola station encountered some flooding and subsistence.

The station is the setting for the short film Ultimo Metro with Debora Calì.

== Amenities ==
In December 2022, the station was one of the first on the Rome Metro to have Amazon lockers installed for pickup of online orders. Bike parking was added in 2023. This was done to prevent the longtime crime of bicycle theft, and to increase intermodal journeys.

== Nearby amenities ==
The station is in walking distance from many cafes, restaurants and shops. Primarily a "suburban" residential area, the main site is the Parco degli Acquedotti, a 10-minute walk from the station.

The station was re-named to "Giulio Agricola, Aqueduct Park" in 2024 for the 2025 Jubilee, during which 70 million pilgrims and tourists were expected; the hope was that tourists would be encouraged to visit this station to see the out-of-the-way sites in the suburbs.
