= Manzoni – Museo della Liberazione (Rome Metro) =

Rome metro station

Manzoni Museo della Liberazione
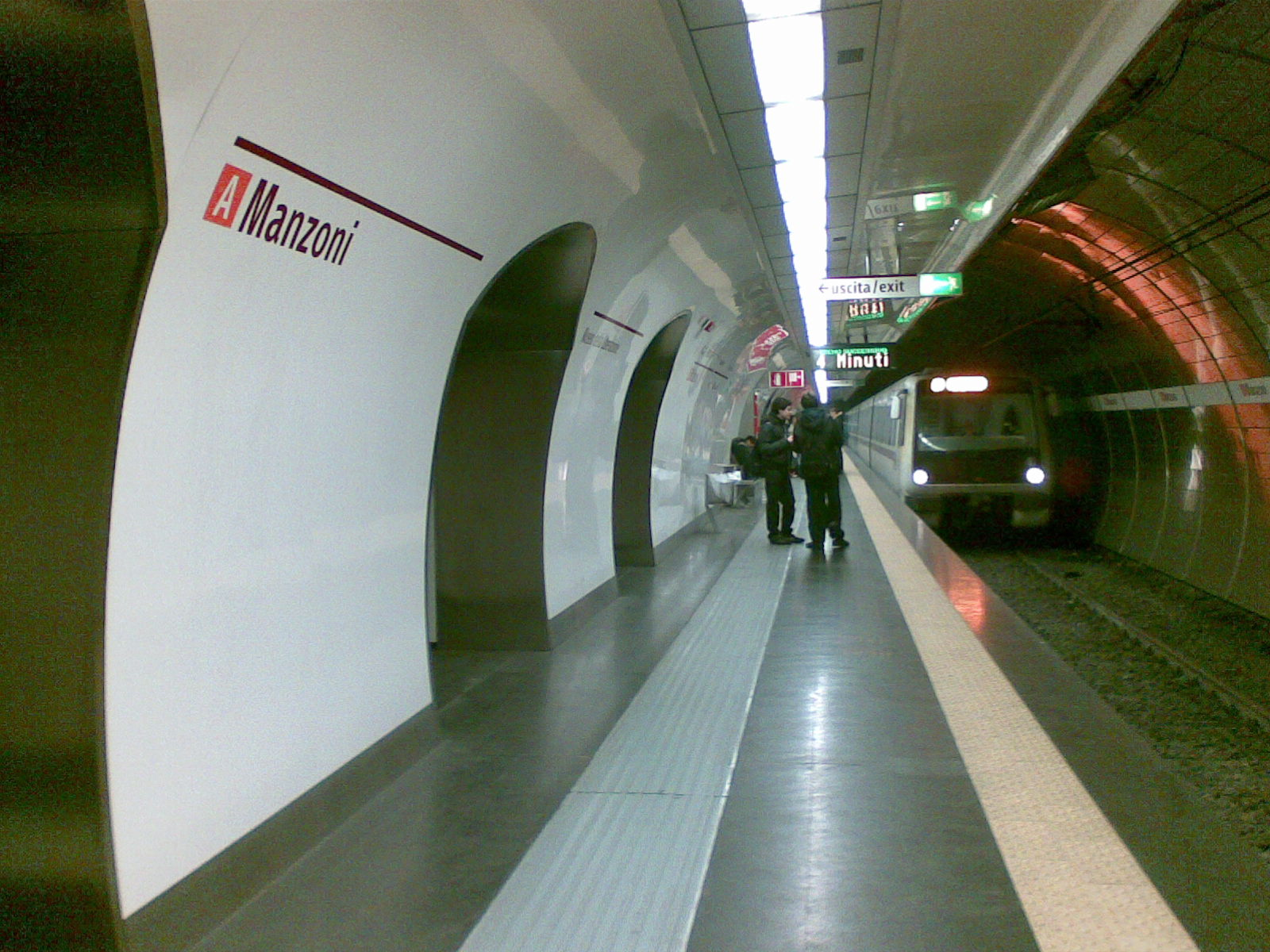

General information
- Coordinates: 41°53′25″N 12°30′25″E
- Owner: ATAC
- Tracks: 2

Construction
- Structure type: Underground

History
- Opened: 1980; 46 years ago

Services
Preceding station	Rome Metro	Following station
Vittorio Emanuele towards Battistini	Line A	San Giovanni towards Anagnina
Location
- Click on the map to see marker

Manzoni–Museo della Liberazione (formerly Manzoni) is an underground station on Line A of the Rome Metro, inaugurated in 1980. It is located under the junction of Viale Alessandro Manzoni, Via Emanuele Filiberto and Via San Quintino, in Esquilino rione.

== Located nearby ==
- Piazza Dante
- Viale Manzoni
- Museum of the Liberation of Rome (Italian: Museo Storico della Liberazione). Museum housed in the former headquarters of the SS during German occupation of Italy (via Tasso 145).

== Refurbishment ==
The station underwent extensive refurbishment from January 2006 to October 2007, when escalators and electrical, safety and communication systems were upgraded. During the works, archaeological remains were found, and this prolonged their duration. Upon reopening, the station was given the new name Manzoni–Museo della Liberazione.
