= Cornelia (Rome Metro) =

Rome metro station

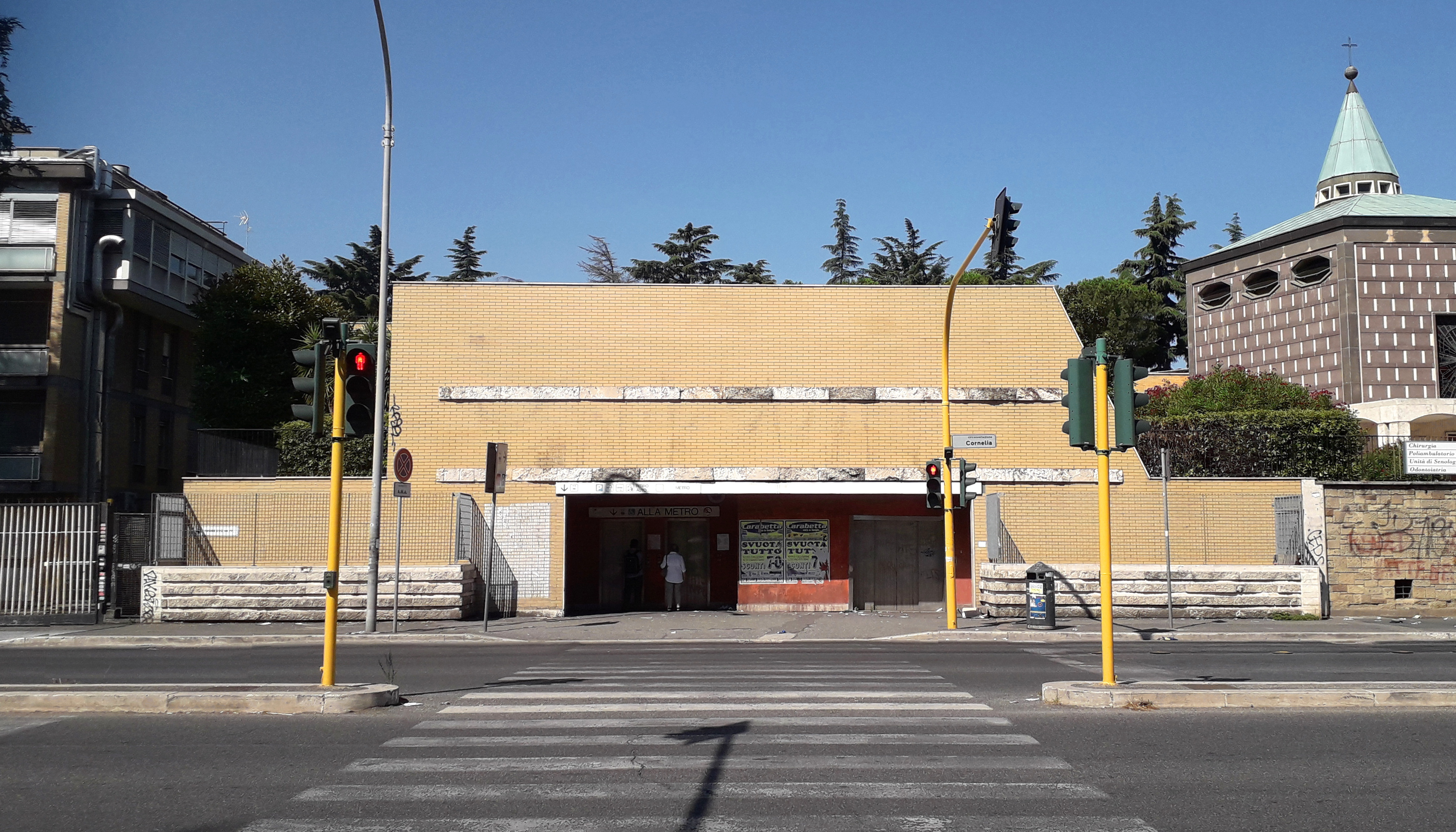

General information
- Coordinates: 41°54′08″N 12°25′31″E
- Owner: ATAC
- Tracks: 2

Construction
- Structure type: Underground

History
- Opened: 1 January 2000; 26 years ago

Services
Preceding station	Rome Metro	Following station
Battistini Terminus	Line A	Baldo degli Ubaldi towards Anagnina
Location
- Click on the map to see marker

Cornelia is an underground station on Line A of the Rome Metro. It is located at the junction of Via di Boccea and the Circonvallazione Cornelia, from which it takes its name. The station was inaugurated on 1 January 2000.

== Services ==
This station has:

- Access for the disabled
- Escalators
- Bus terminus

== Escalators ==
Cornelia is known for its sets of escalators on three levels which are used to enter and exit the station. One escalator is a rarely seen 'narrow style' which runs alongside two average sized escalators. There is another of its type at Spagna station, also on Line A.

== Located nearby ==
- Via Boccea
- Forte Boccea
- Piazza San Giovanni Battista de la Salle
