= Ottaviano – San Pietro – Musei Vaticani =

Rome metro station

Ottaviano San Pietro–Musei Vaticani
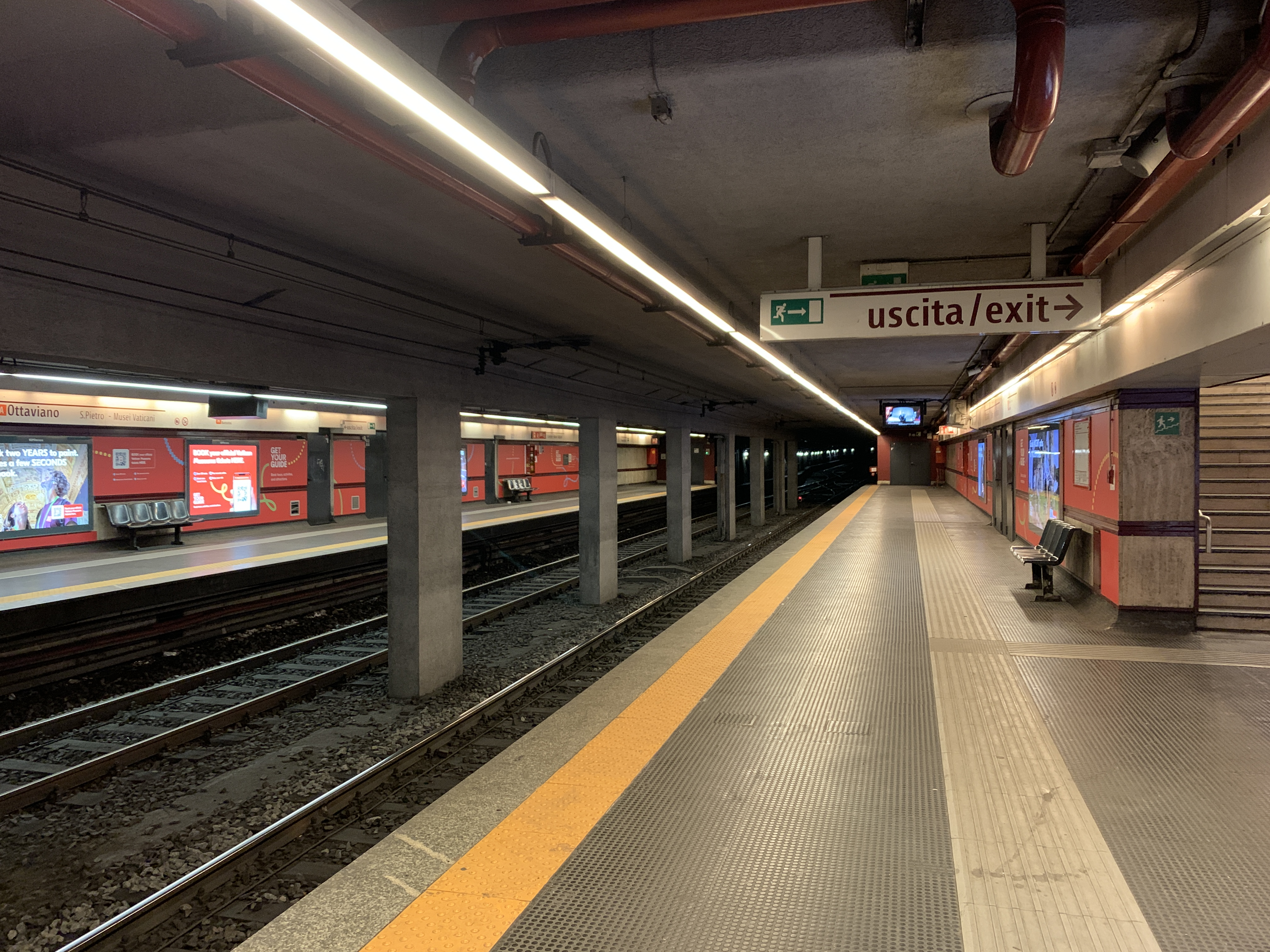
- The platform area of the station in August 2021

General information
- Coordinates: 41°54′34″N 12°27′29″E
- Owner: ATAC
- Platforms: 2 side platforms
- Tracks: 2

Construction
- Structure type: Underground

History
- Opened: 1980; 46 years ago

Services
Preceding station	Rome Metro	Following station
Cipro towards Battistini	Line A	Lepanto towards Anagnina
Location
- Click on the map to see marker

Ottaviano–San Pietro–Musei Vaticani, also just known as Ottaviano, is a station on Line A of the Rome Metro.

The station is situated at the junction of Viale Giulio Cesare with Via Ottaviano and Via Barletta, in Prati.

Since 2006 the station has been the site of archaeological excavations in preparation for the construction of Line C. It will form an interchange station between lines A and C.

== Located nearby ==
- Vatican City
  - St. Peter's Basilica
  - Piazza San Pietro
  - Vatican Museums
- Via della Conciliazione
- Piazza del Risorgimento
- Borgo
- Prati
  - Piazza dei Quiriti
- Giulio Cesare Theater
- Via Candia
