= Valle Aurelia (Rome Metro) =

Rome metro station

Valle Aurelia (underground portion)
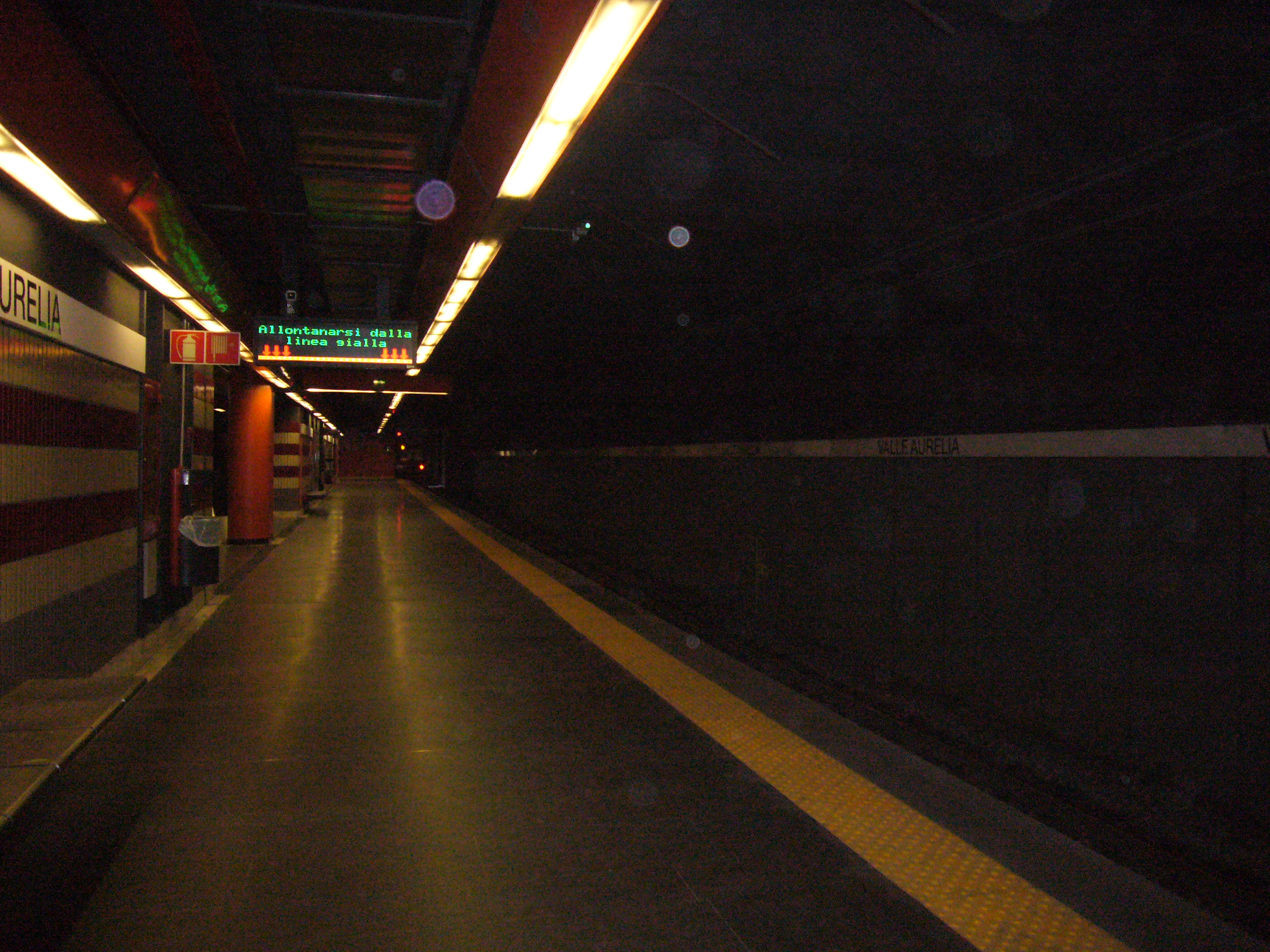

General information
- Coordinates: 41°54′11″N 12°26′30″E
- Owner: ATAC
- Platforms: 1 island platform
- Tracks: 2
- Connections: Valle Aurelia railway station (FL3)

Construction
- Structure type: Underground

History
- Opened: 1999; 27 years ago

Services
Preceding station	Rome Metro	Following station
Baldo degli Ubaldi towards Battistini	Line A	Cipro towards Anagnina
Location
- Click on the map to see marker

Valle Aurelia is a train station in Rome, Italy.

There is an underground station on Line A of the Rome Metro, situated between Cipro "Museo-Vaticani" and Via Baldo degli Ubaldi. The station was inaugurated in 1999.

On the street level and above the street level is the Valle Aurelia railway station, so this station is an interchange with the regional railway FR3.

== Services ==
This station has:

- 126 Park and Ride places.
- Access for the disabled
- Elevators
- Escalators

== Located nearby ==
- Parco di Monte Ciocci
- St. George's British International School - City Centre Junior School campus
