= Cipro (Rome Metro) =

Rome metro station

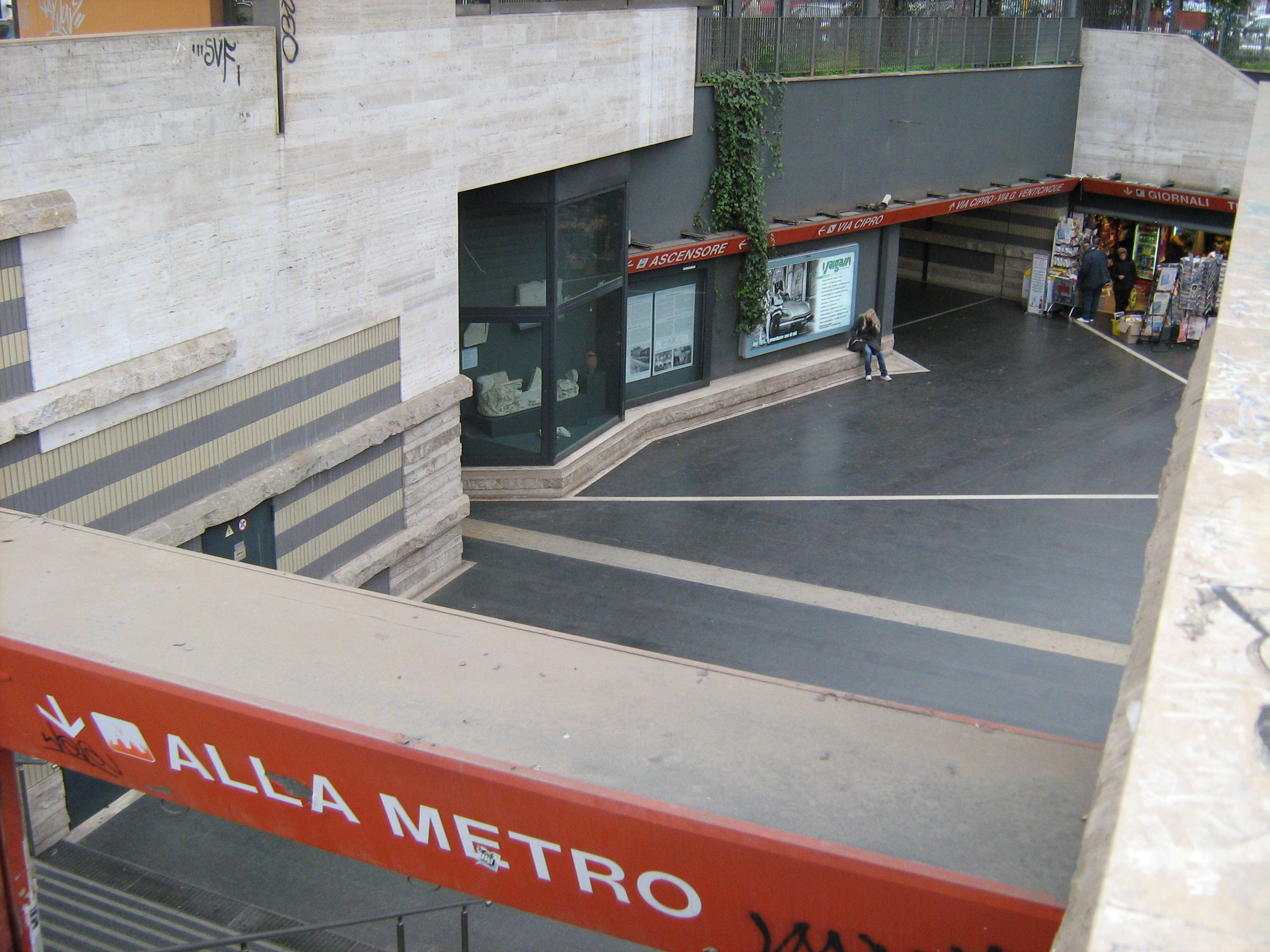
- The atrium of Cipro station: the showcase with the archeological finds is visible near the centre of the image

General information
- Coordinates: 41°54′27″N 12°26′51″E
- Owner: ATAC
- Tracks: 2

Construction
- Structure type: Underground

History
- Opened: 1999; 27 years ago

Services
| Preceding station | Rome Metro | Following station |
|---|---|---|
| Valle Aurelia towards Battistini | Line A | Ottaviano towards Anagnina |
Location
- Click on the map to see marker

Cipro (formerly Cipro–Musei Vaticani) is an underground station on Line A of the Rome Metro, inaugurated in 1999. The station is situated between Via Cipro and Via Angelo Emo.

Cipro is the Italian name for Cyprus, which the street that the station is on is named after. Several streets in the area are named after places and people related to the history of the Republic of Venice and other Maritime republics.

== Archaeology ==
In the open-air atrium below street level, some archeological finds, found in 1993/94 during the digging of the Ottaviano-Battistini section of Line A, are exhibited. They include a 3rd-century CE sarcophagus in Carrara marble, a funerary ash urn, and some inscriptions; in the neighbourhood, which in ancient times was out of Rome proper, there was a large burial ground, on both sides of Via Triumphalis.

In 1991, the municipality of Rome planned to call the station Mosca (Moscow). To reciprocate, a Moscow Metro station was named Rimskaya (Roman).

== Services ==
This station has:

- Access for the disabled
- 277 Park and Ride spaces
- Elevators
- Escalators
- Bus terminus

== Located Nearby ==
- Musei Vaticani
- Piazzale degli Eroi
- Mercato Trionfale
- Ospedale Oftalmico
