= Cinecittà (Rome Metro) =

Rome metro station

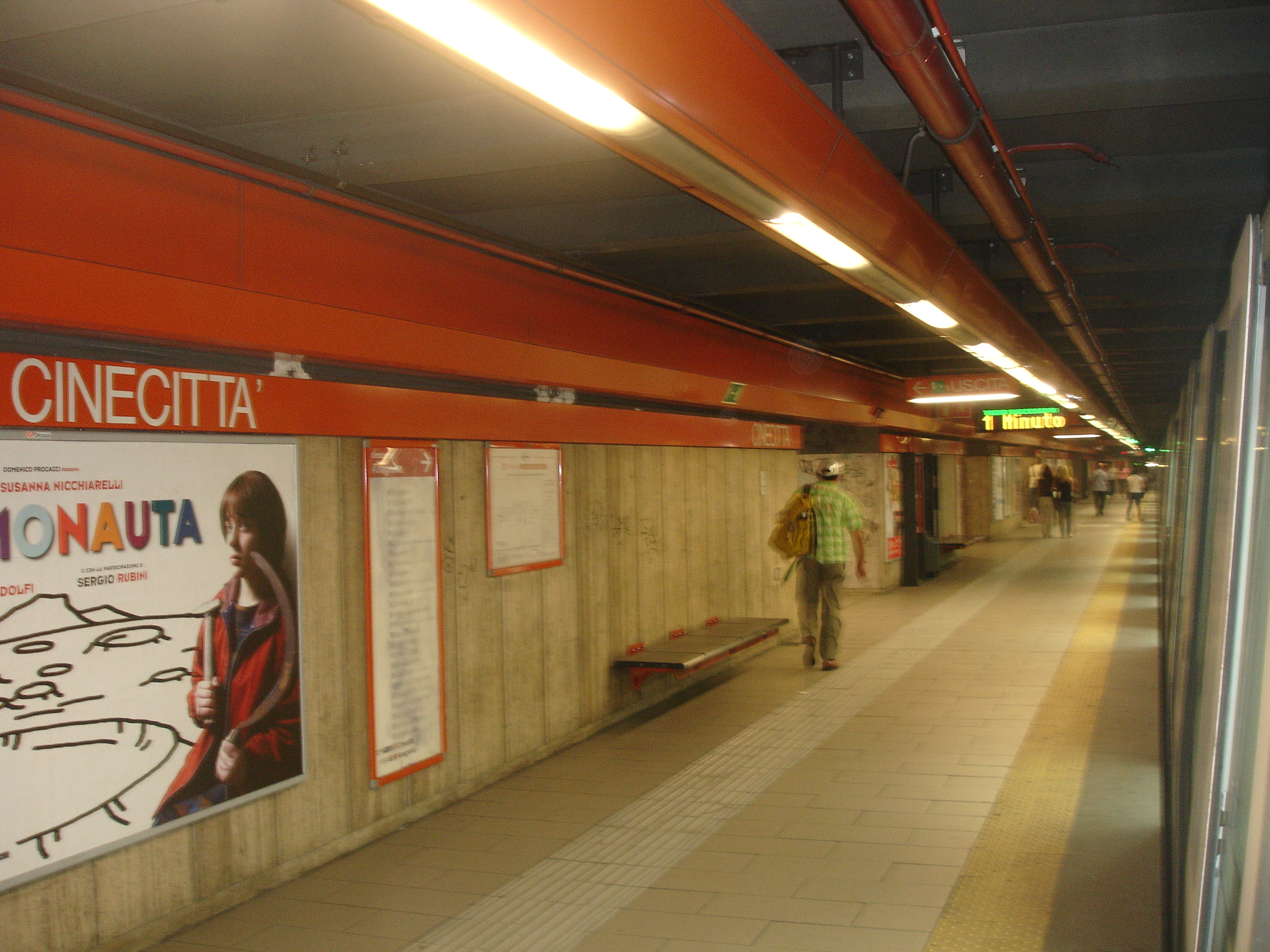

General information
- Coordinates: 41.8487°N 12.5754°E
- Owner: ATAC
- Platforms: Side platform
- Tracks: 2

Construction
- Structure type: Underground

History
- Opened: 1980; 46 years ago

Services
Preceding station	Rome Metro	Following station
Subaugusta towards Battistini	Line A	Anagnina Terminus
Location
- Click on the map to see marker

Cinecittà is a station on the Rome Metro. It is on Line A and is located at the intersection of Via Tuscolana, Via di Torre Spaccata and Via delle Capannelle.
