= Mikhail Koulakov =

Russian painter

- Born: Mikhail Alexievich Koulakov; 8 January 1933; Moscow, Russian SFSR, USSR
- Died: 15 February 2015 (aged 82); Terni, Province of Terni, Italy
- Education: State Theater institute, Leningrad
- Known for: Painting
- Movement: Abstract Expressionism

Mikhail Alexievich Koulakov (Russian: Михаил Алексеевич Кулаков; 8 January 1933 – 15 February 2015) was a Russian abstract painter.

== Early life and education ==
Born in Moscow on 8 January 1933, Koulakov majored in stage design, studying with the painter and director Nikolai Akimov, at the Institute of Theatre Arts in Leningrad.

== Career ==
He worked as a graphic designer for the publishing company Lenizdat, illustrating the work of his friends, the poets V. Sosnora, G. Gorbovsky, S. Davydov, and the short stories and tales of Alexander Grin among others. Koulakov worked for theatres in Volchov, Leningrad and Moscow.

In 1967 he designed the stage set for Vladimir Mayakovsky's play ″The Bathhouse″ at the Moscow Theater of Satire. Koulakov resided in Italy from 1976 until his death in 2015 and worked in his studio in San Vito (Narni), Umbria. In 1993 he was elected a senior academician of the Fine Arts Academy “Pietro Vannucci”, Perugia.

== Death ==
Koulakov died on 15 February 2015, aged 82.

== Art ==
Koulakov was a representative of the Soviet avant-garde of the 1960s and one of the founders of the "Second Abstraction" in Russia; he graduated in set design under Nikolai Akimov, an artist and the director, at the Leningrad's Institute for Theatrical Arts in 1962, and started his career in Moscow and Leningrad where his works were displayed in alternative spaces to the prevailing socialist realism.

== Martial arts ==
Koulakov was a tai chi 7th Dan master. In 1990 he published the book Tai Chi Chuan, il Grande Limite.

== Exhibitions ==
Anthological exhibitions

His anthological exhibitions include:

- 1988: Auditorium of San Domenico (Narni)
- 1989: The Soviet Union Foundation of Culture, ex-riding school of the Czars in Leningrad and Riga Arsenal
- 1991: Architectural complex “San Michele a Ripa” in Rome
- 1993: Pushkin State Museum of Fine Arts, Moscow, State Ethnographic Museum, St. Petersburg, and Palazzo Ruspoli in Rome
- 1996: “Bibliomediateca” (Terni)
- 2003: CERP “Centro Espositivo Rocca Paolina” (Perugia)

Collective exhibitions

Some of the collective exhibitions he has taken part:

- 1977: “Salon d'Art Sacre” in Paris
- 1977: “X Quadriennale” in Rome
- 1977: Venice Biennial “La nuova arte sovietica. Una prospettiva non ufficiale”
- 1979: “20 Jahre unabhaengiger Kunst aus der Sovjetunion”, Museum Bochum, Bochumkunstsammlung, Bochum
- 1994: “IV Biennale di Arte Sacra”, San Gabriele, Teramo
- 1995: “From Gulag to glasnost” Norton and Nancy Dodge Collection, Jane Vorhees Zimmerli Art Museum, Rutgers, USA
- 1996: “Non konformisty-Seconda avanguardia russa”, Collezione Bar-Ger: The Russian State Museum, St. Petersburg - State Tretjakov Gallery, Moscow - Staedel Kunstinstitut, Frankfurt am Main - Kunsthaus, Leverkusen
- 1997: Josef Albers Museum, Quadrat Bottrop; “Arte Metro Roma” project, mosaic at Anagnina Metro Station, Rome
- 1998: “Anatomia Sovremennogo iskusstva” St. Petersburg
- 1999: “Die Suche nach der Freiheit. Moskauer Kuenstler der 50er und 70er Jahre”, Berlin-Hamburg; “Un colore in più”, Spazio Krizia, Milan
- 2000: “Un angelo per la città”, Rocca Paolina, Perugia
- 2001: “Abstrakzia v Rossii”, Russian State Museum, St. Petersburg
- 2003: “Moskovskaja abstrakzia, 2. polovina XX veka”, State Tretjakov Gallery, Moscow.

Personal Exhibitions

- 1964: House of Culture, Akademgorodok Novosibirsk
- 1966: Theatre of Satire, Moscow
- 1967: Institute of Physics, Moscow
- 1968: Institute of Physics, Erevan
- 1968: Institute of Physics and Chemics, Moscow
- 1969: House of Scientists Dubna, Moscow
- 1975: Libreria Internazionale Paesi Nuovi, Roma
- 1977: Galleria Trifalco, Roma
- 1977: International Institute, Minneapolis
- 1977: Banach Gallery, New York
- 1978: Galleria Trifalco, Roma
- 1979: Galerie Slavia, Bremen
- 1980: Galleria Cecchini, Perugia
- 1980: Cooperatriva Esperienze Culturali, Bari
- 1980: Galleria San Carlo, Napoli
- 1981: Galerie Basilisk, Wien
- 1984: Galleria Cortina, Milano
- 1985: Palazzo dei Priori, Perugia
- 1986: Galerie Schrepfer, München
- 1988: Galleria Trifalco, Roma
- 1988: Auditorium San Domenico, Narni
- 1989: Galerie Art East Art West, Hamburg
- 1989: Mugnano di Perugia
- 1989: Gallery of Soviet Culture Fund, Moscow
- 1990: Arsenal, Riga
- 1990: Manege, Leningrad
- 1990: Savitski Gallery, Pensa
- 1990: Galleria La Gradiva, Roma
- 1990: Galleria Il Bucchero, Ortebello
- 1991: Galleria Forzani, Terni
- 1991: Dostojevski Museum, Leningrad
- 1991: Yurjevski Monastery, Novgorod
- 1991: S. Michele a Ripa, Roma
- 1992: G. Braun Medienhaus, Karlsruhe
- 1992: Galerie Art Modern International, Aachen
- 1992: Galerie Kunst in der Scheune, Offenbach
- 1992: Castello Trecentesco, Celano
- 1993: Pushkin Museum, Moscow
- 1993: Palazzo Ruspoli, Roma
- 1993: Russian Ethnographic Museum, St. Petersburg
- 1993: Palazzo Petrignani, Amelia
- 1993: Galerie Weber, Berlin
- 1996: Bibliomediateca, Terni
- 1999: Spazio Arte, Perugia
- 1999: Banca d'Italia, Roma
- 2003: "Celare il cielo", Galleria Giulia, Roma
- 2003: "Genesi", Rocca Paolina, Perugia
- 2003: "Radici e Globalizzazione. Omaggio a Mikhail Koulakov", Palazzo Santoro Colella, Pratola Peligna
- 2005: "Verso l'autunno", l'Indicatore, Roma
- 2007: "Put geroia", Galereia Albom, Sankt Peterburg
- 2007: "Besoblachnoe vremia - Tempo senza nubi", Fond Era, Moskva
- 2008: "Il Sole, la Luna, l'Universo", Circolo Culturale l'Officina, Perugia
- 2008: Galleria Arte Contemporanea Sante Moretto, Vicenza
- 2008: "Potop mlechnyh putei. Diluvio delle vie lattee", State Tretyakov Gallery, Moskva
- 2008: "Fiori celesti", Palazzo Venezia, Roma
- 2011: "Signs of Spirituality", Galleria Nazionale di Arte Moderna GNAM, Roma
- 2011: H.C. Andersen Museum, Rome
- 2013: "80 anni tra Russia e Italia", Centro Russo di Scienze e Cultura, Roma
- 2015: "Mikhail Koulakov: Umbria seconda patria", Palazzo Vecchio, Sangemini
- 2016: "Mikhail Koulakov: Il Cosmo nel Gesto", Palazzo di Primavera, Terni
- 2019: "Mikhail Kulakov. The Style of the Thaw Period", MMOMA Moscow Museum of Modern Art, Moscow
