= Line A (Rome Metro) =

Rapid transit line in Rome, Italy

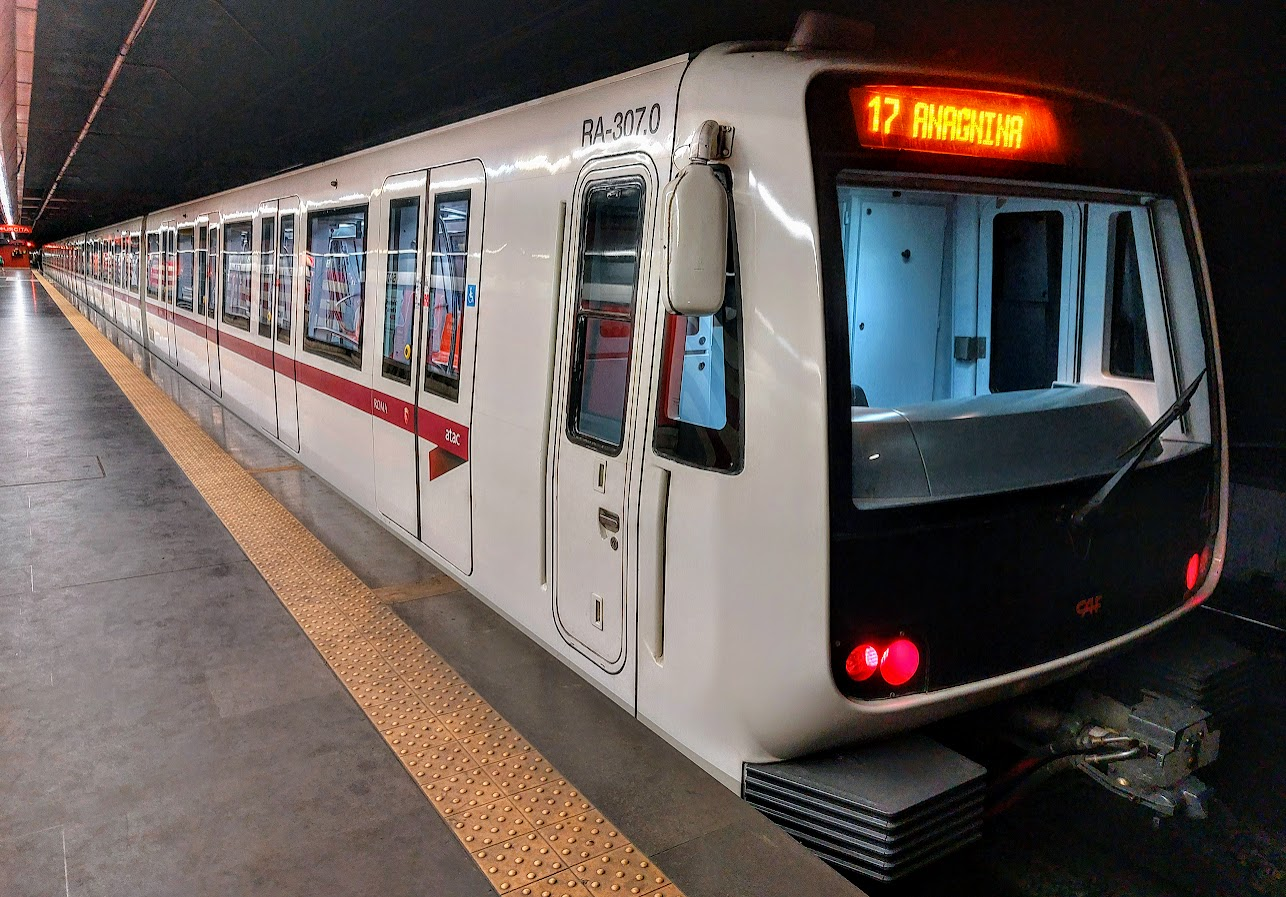
- CAF S/300 train at Termini station

Overview
- Status: In use
- Owner: ATAC
- Locale: Rome, Italy
- Termini: Battistini (northwest); Anagnina (southeast)
- Stations: 27

Service
- Type: Rapid transit
- System: Rome Metro
- Operator: ATAC
- Daily ridership: 246,129 (2023)

History
- Opened: 16 February 1980; 46 years ago
- Last extension: 1 January 2000

Technical
- Line length: 18.425 kilometres (11.449 mi)
- Character: Underground
- Track gauge: 1,435 mm (4 ft 8 1/2 in)
- Electrification: Overhead lines
Route map
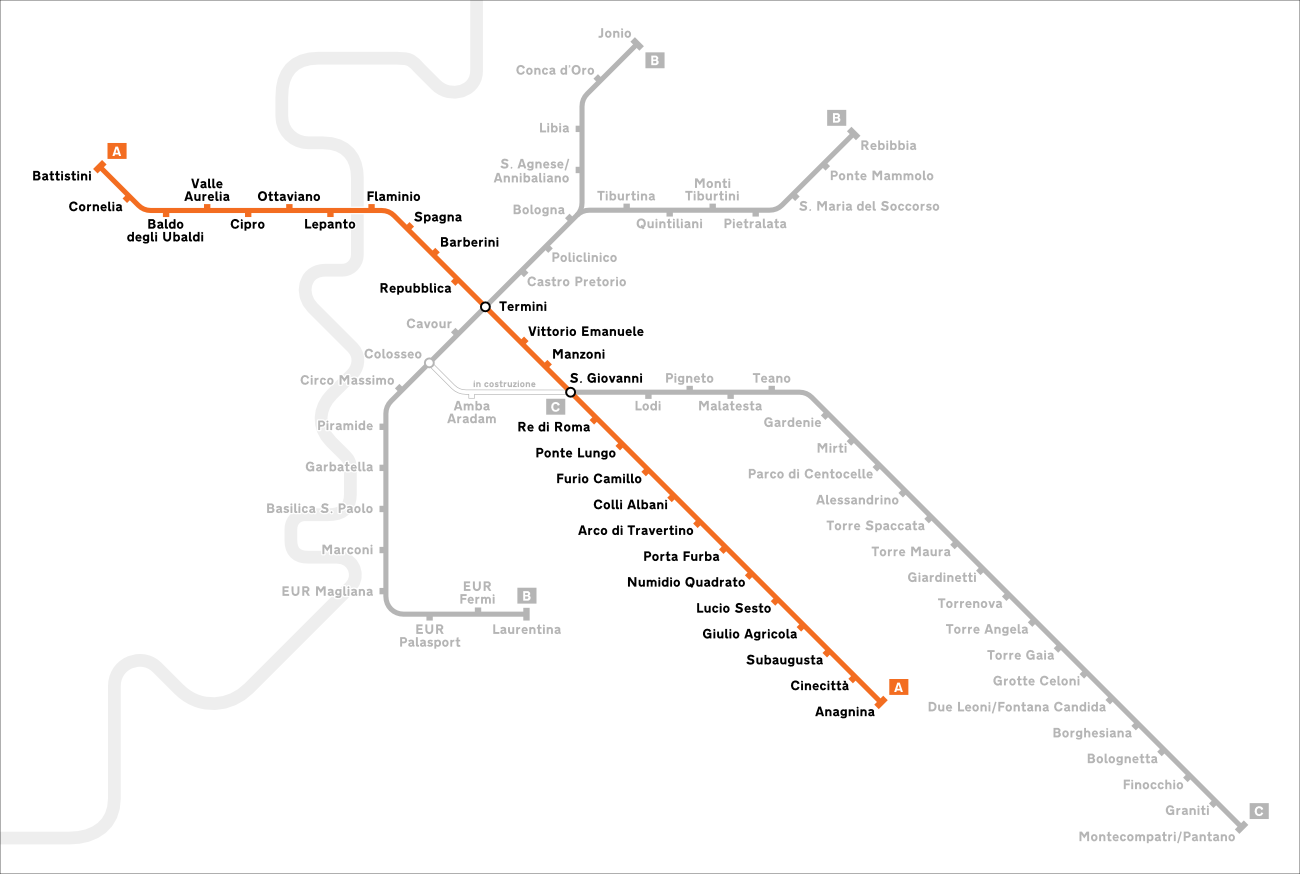

Line A (Italian: Linea A) is a metro line serving Rome, Italy, and part of the Rome Metro. It runs across the city diagonally from the north-west terminus at Battistini to the south-east terminus at Anagnina. The line intersects with Line B at Termini and with Line C at San Giovanni. It is color-coded orange on transit maps and is the only line in the network that crosses the Tiber river.

As the most heavily utilized route in the system, Line A is estimated to transport nearly half a million passengers daily.

== History ==
In 1959, approval was granted for the construction of Rome's second metropolitan railway line, running from the Osteria del Curato area to the Prati district. The route was planned to pass through the historic city center, intersecting with the pre-existing Line B (opened in 1955) at Termini Station.

Construction began in 1964 in the Tuscolana area but immediately faced severe delays. The initial cut and cover excavation method caused widespread traffic disruption in south-eastern Rome, leading to a five-year suspension of works. Tunneling resumed using tunnel boring machines (TBMs); while this mitigated surface traffic issues, the resulting vibrations caused minor structural damage to several historic buildings.

Archaeological discoveries frequently halted progress, particularly beneath Piazza della Repubblica. These findings required significant architectural redesigns. The uncovered ancient remains were ultimately integrated into the design of Repubblica station, where they are showcased in protective glass display cases. This tumultuous construction period and its archaeological hurdles were famously dramatized in Federico Fellini's 1972 satirical comedy film, Roma.

The line officially began public service on 16 February 1980, running from Anagnina to Ottaviano. At this time, it took the official designation of "Line A", while the original Termini-Laurentina route was renamed "Line B". In the early 1990s, construction started on a north-western extension from Ottaviano to Battistini, which opened in stages between 1999 and 2000.

Between 2024 and 2026, the line underwent an extensive infrastructure modernization program to replace aging tracks and upgrade key stations (including Spagna, Ottaviano, and Lepanto) ahead of and following the 2025 Jubilee.

=== Opening dates ===
- 16 February 1980: Ottaviano – Cinecittà
- 11 June 1980: Cinecittà – Anagnina
- 29 May 1999: Ottaviano – Valle Aurelia
- 1 January 2000: Valle Aurelia – Battistini

== Rolling stock ==
The original rolling stock used on Line A consisted of the MA100 series trains, which initially operated in 4-car formations before expanding to 6-car setups to accommodate growing passenger volumes. Following their retirement from Line A, several MA100 units were sold and transferred to the Buenos Aires Underground network.

In the late 1990s, the MA200 series entered service. It was the first train type on the Rome Metro to utilize three-phase asynchronous motors with an electronic drive traction system. However, the series suffered from frequent technical reliability issues.

Beginning in January 2005, ATAC began phasing out both the MA100 and MA200 stocks in favor of modern, air-conditioned S/300 trains built by the Spanish manufacturer CAF (Construcciones y Auxiliar de Ferrocarriles), designated as the MA300 series. The displaced older units were transferred to the Rome-Lido railway. Today, the CAF S/300 trains make up the entirety of Line A's active fleet and were the first cars in the network to feature computerized automated route announcements.

== Statistics ==
Year	2014	2015	2016	2017	2018	2019	2020	2021	2022	2023	2024
Passengers (millions)	114.70	111.81	109.00	108.20	117.53	110.44	49.29	56.66	79.72	89.39	94.38

== Incidents ==
=== 2006 crash ===
On 17 October 2006, a severe rear-end collision between two trains occurred at the Vittorio Emanuele station on Line A. The crash resulted in the death of one person and caused injuries to more than 100 others.

== Extensions ==
An extension further north-west beyond Battistini toward Torrevecchia has been formally integrated into Rome's urban mobility plans. The project introduces two new planned stations: Pietro Bembo and the new terminus at Torrevecchia. Definitive planning updates were finalized ahead of scheduling construction works to begin within 2026.

Additionally, ongoing construction works on Line C's central section are designed to establish a future secondary interchange hub at Ottaviano.

Section	Construction start	Estimated opening	Length	Stations	Project status
Line A branch Battistini ↔ Torrevecchia	2026	2030	2.3 km	2	Under construction

== Stations ==
Metro Line A in Rome
Metro station
Metro interchange

=== Gallery ===
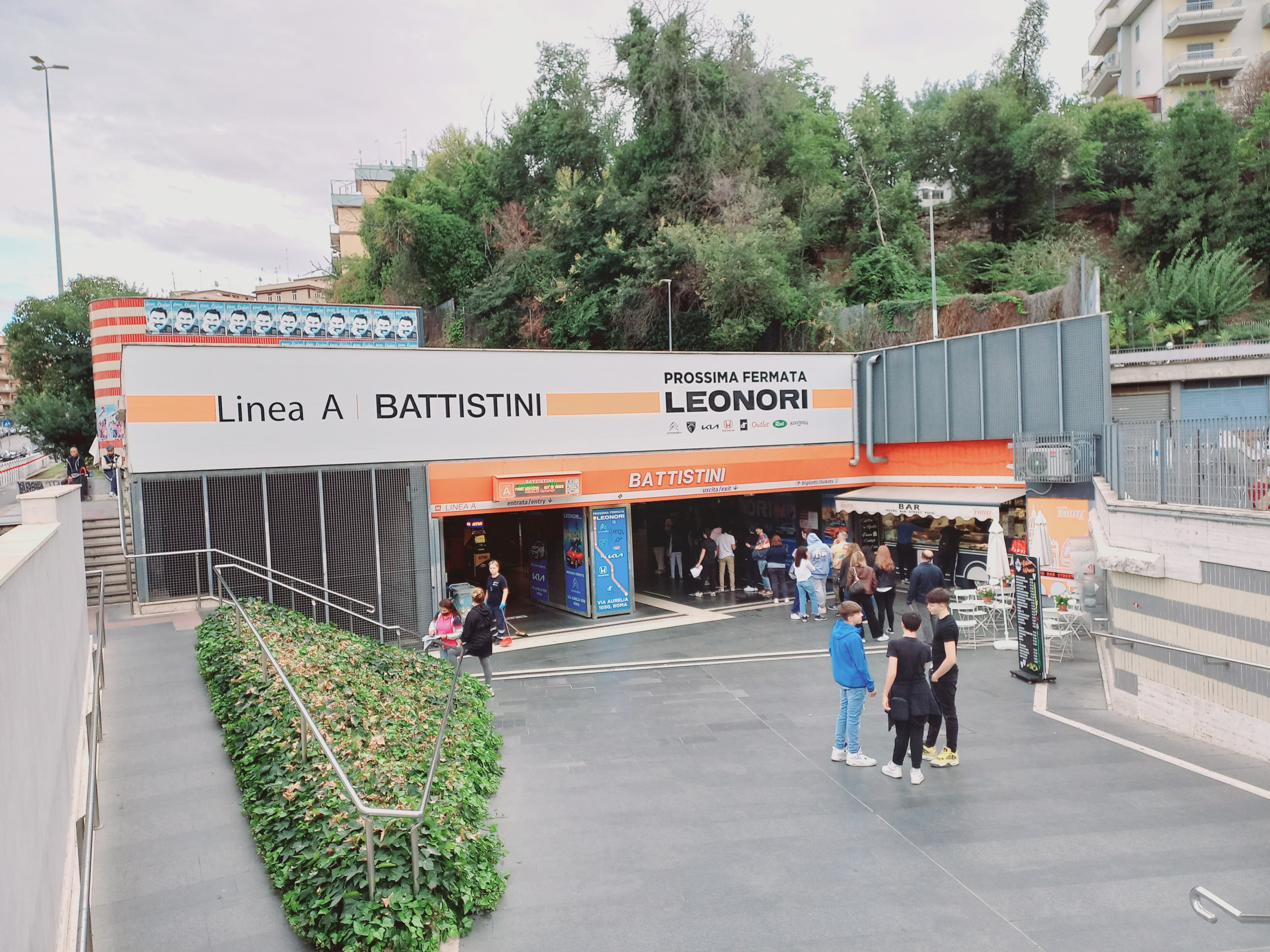
Battistini

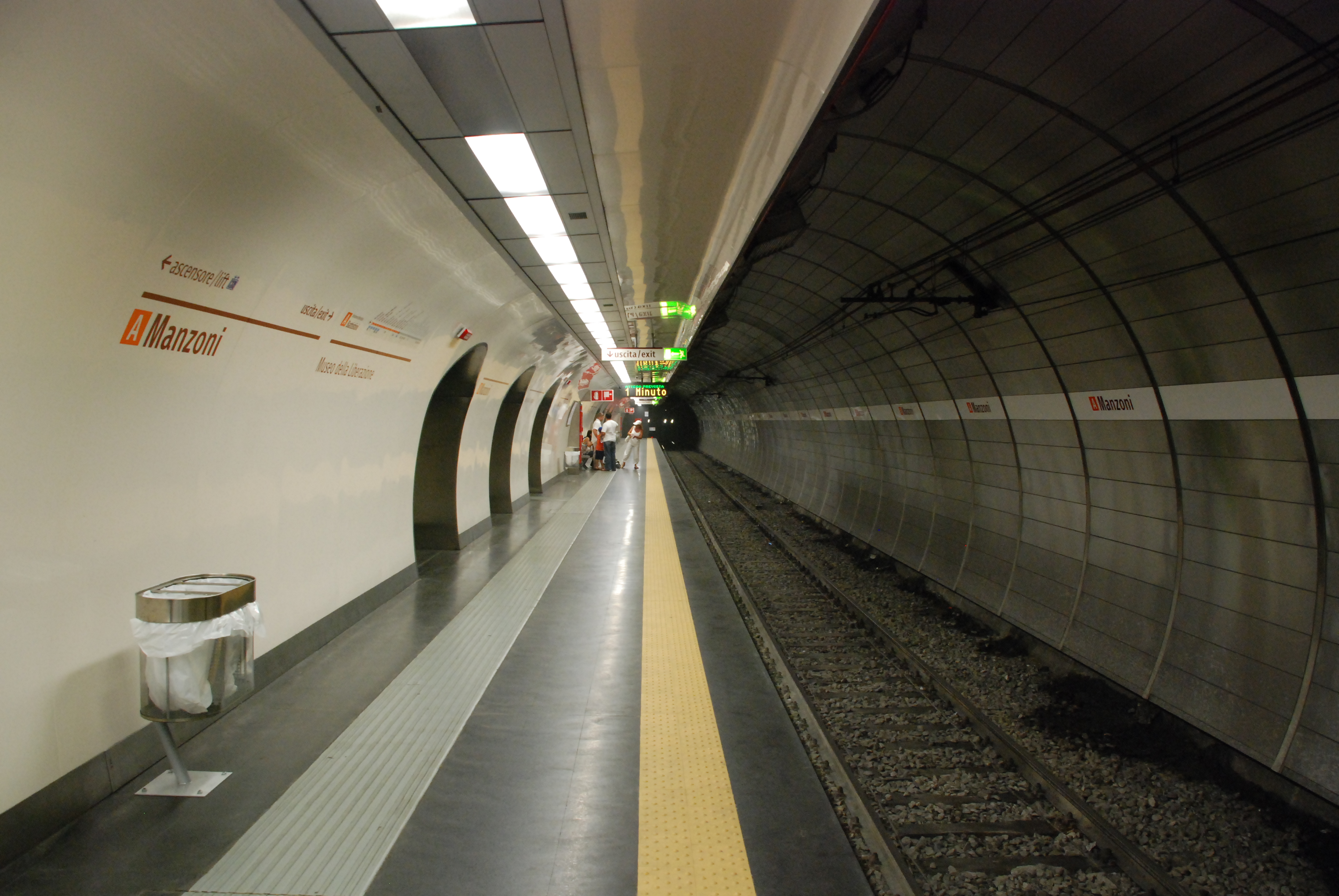
Manzoni

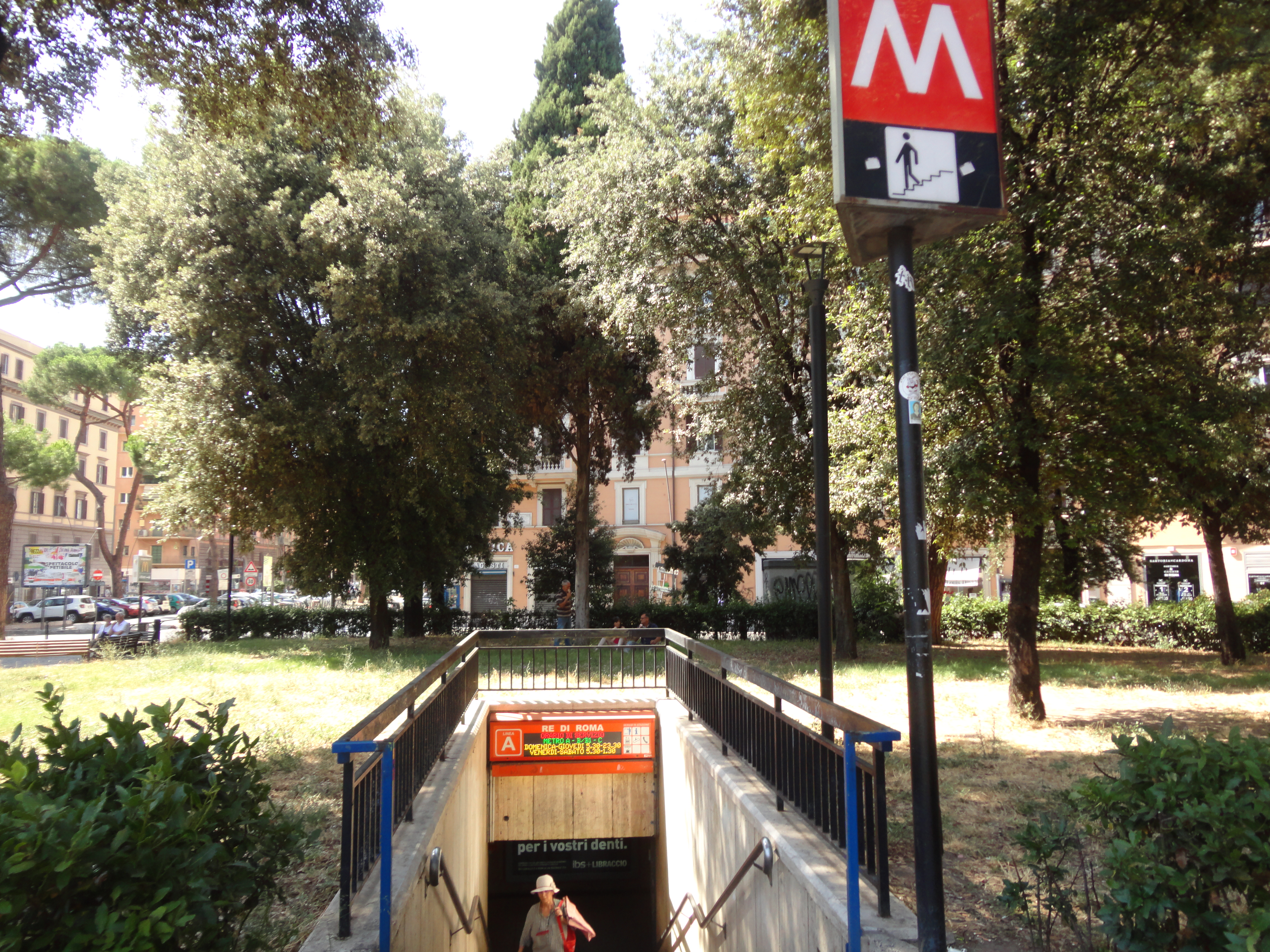
Re di Roma

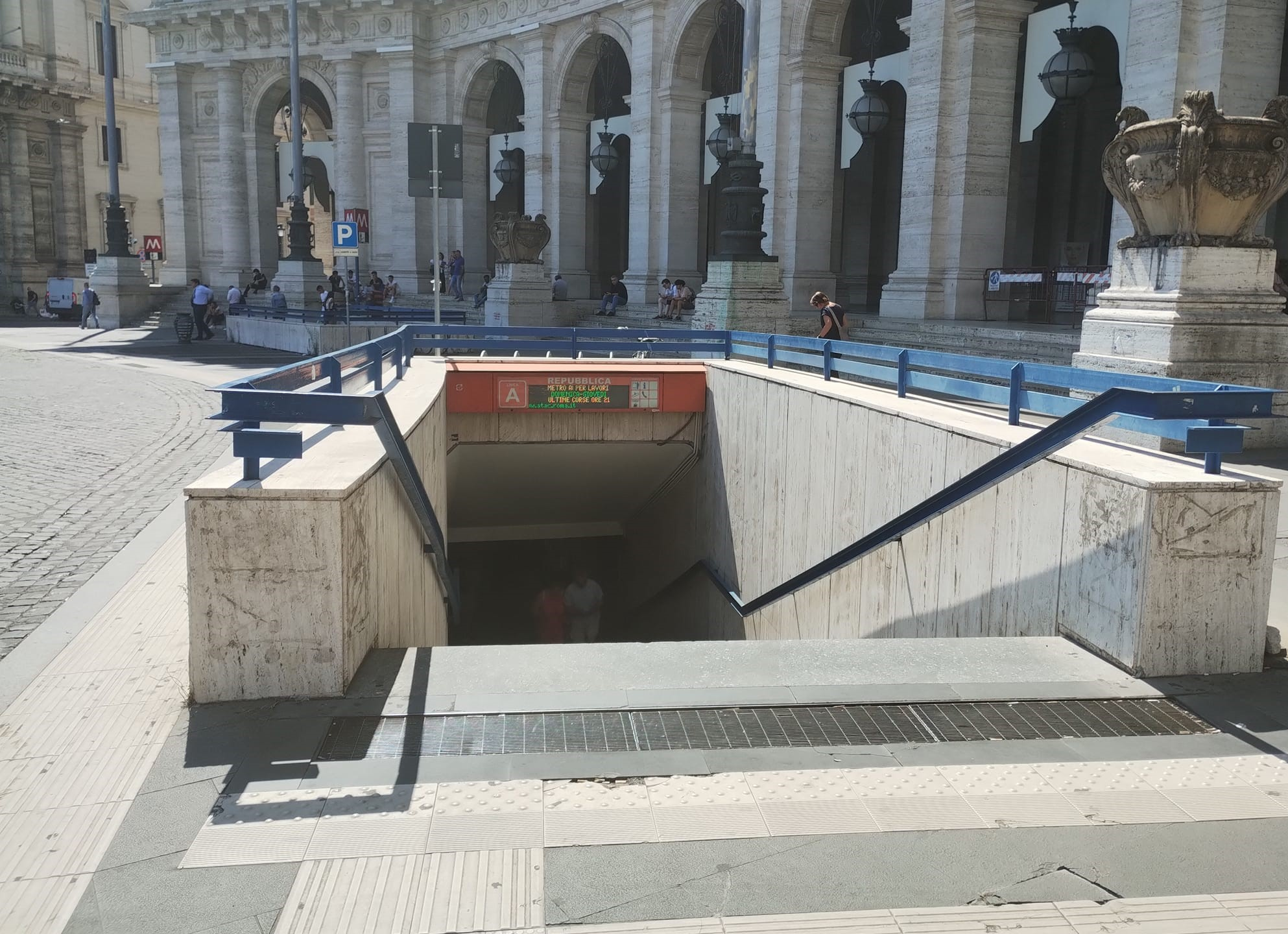
Repubblica

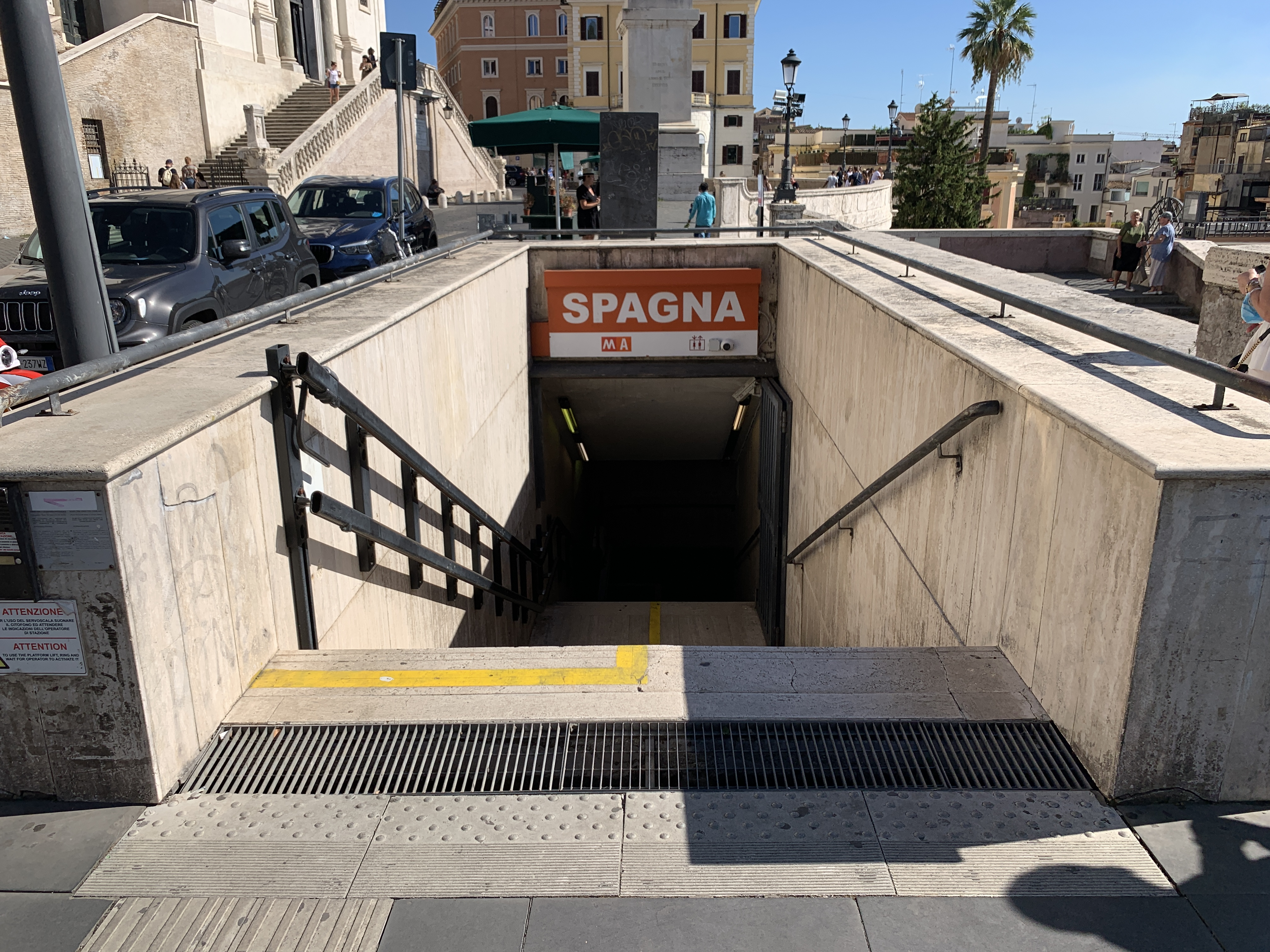
Spagna

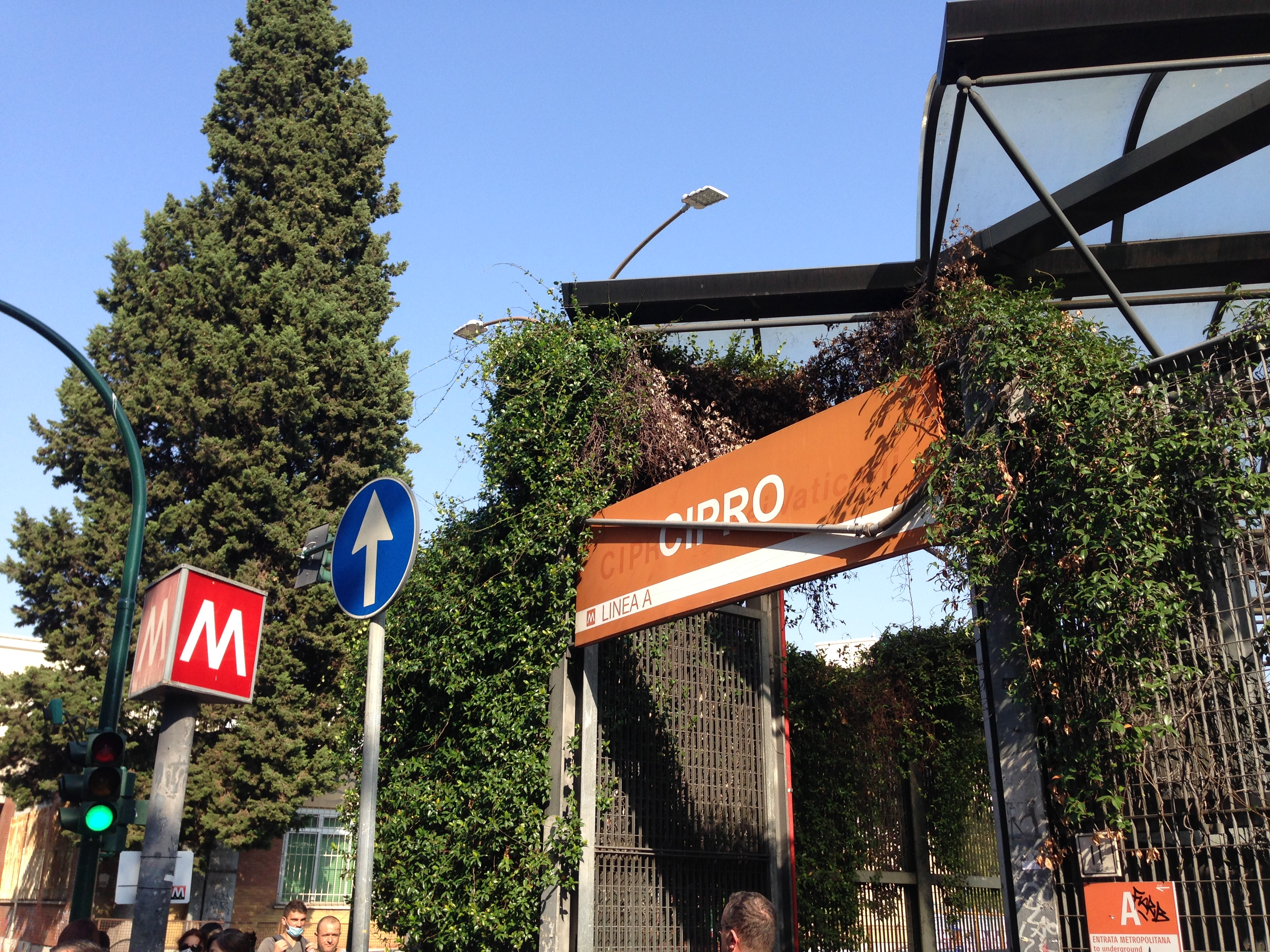
Cipro

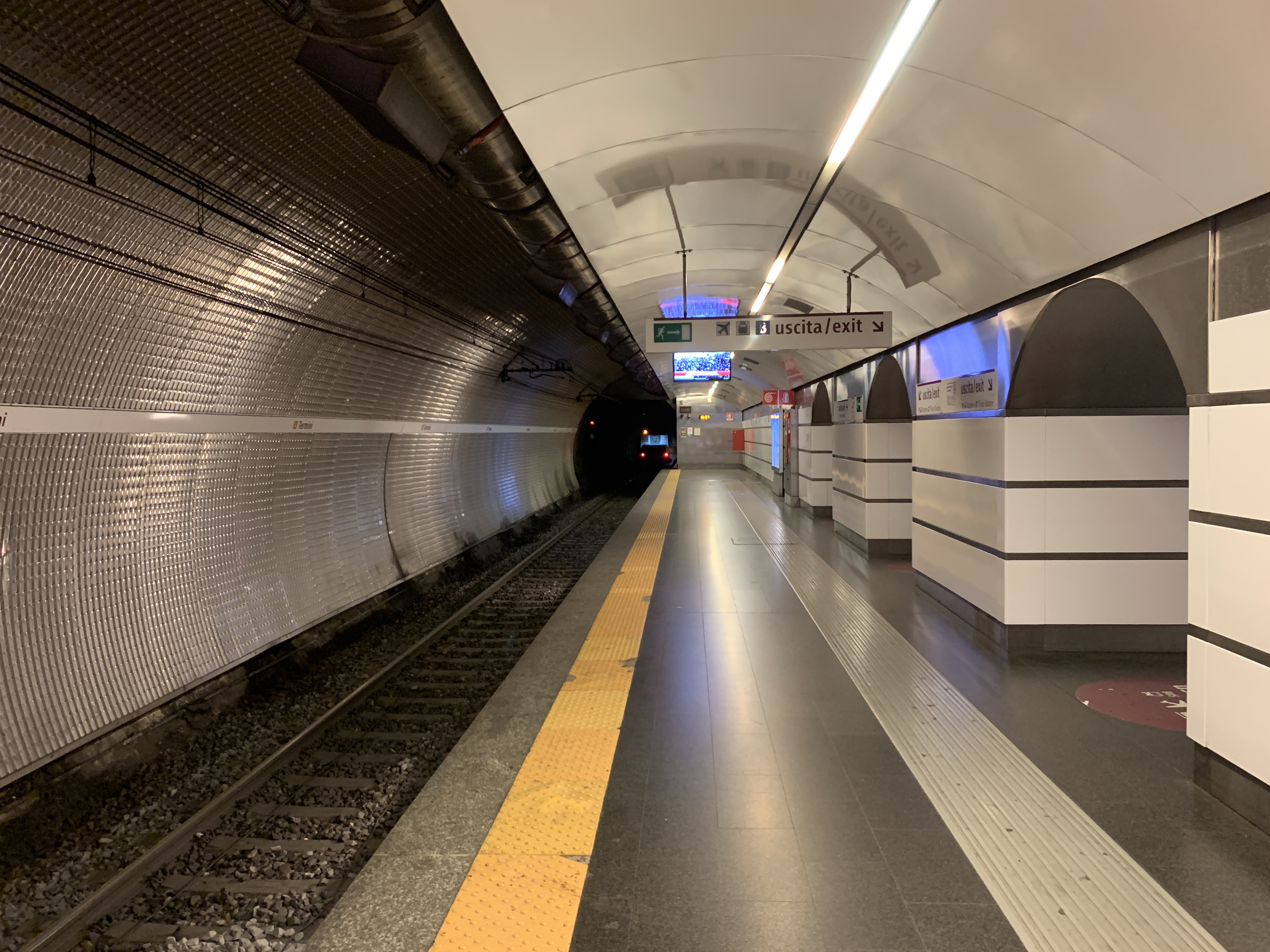
Termini

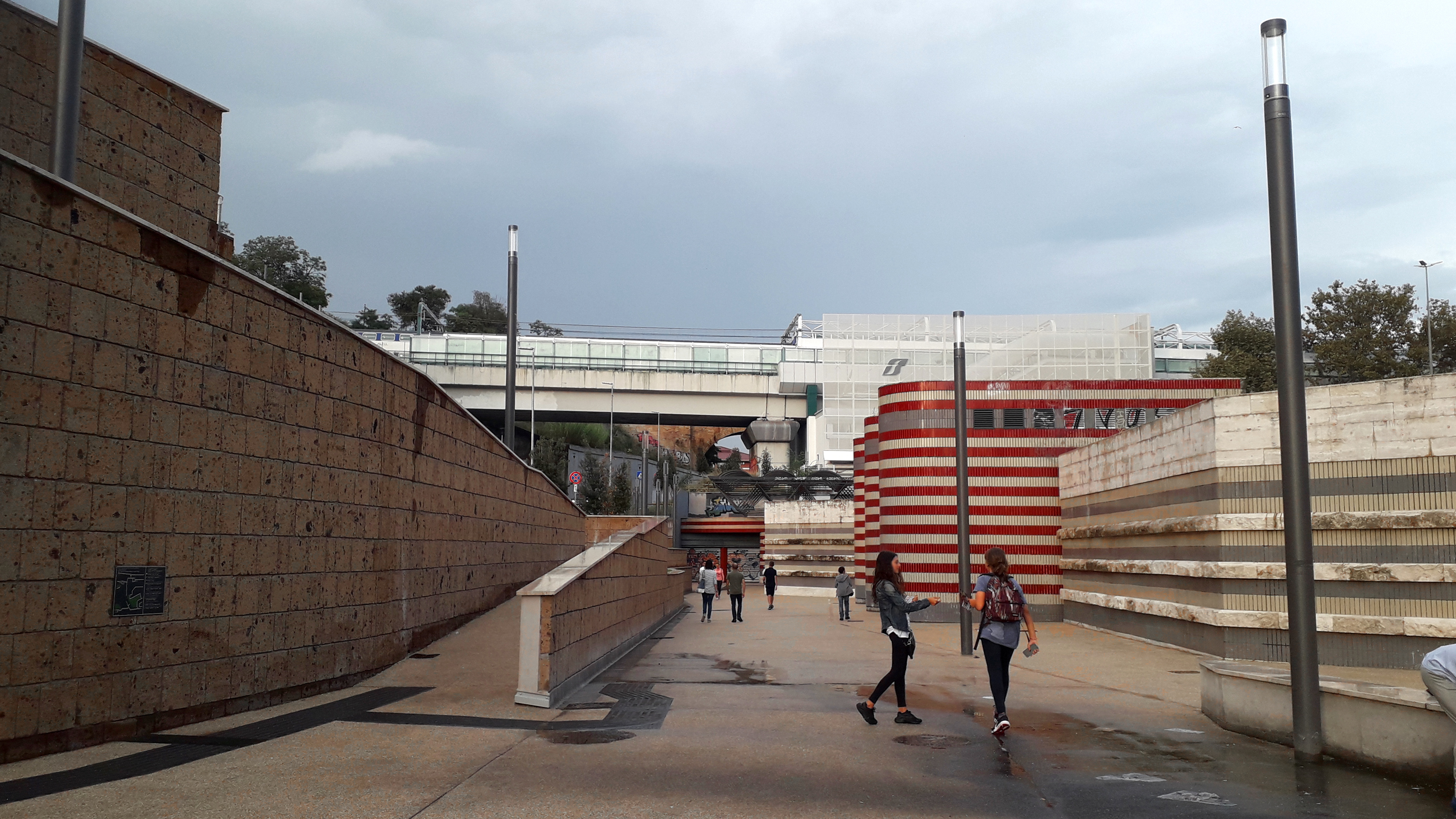
Valle Aurelia

== Maps ==
- Rome Metro and Suburban railways
- Old Map of the plans for the Rome Metro
