= Battistini (Rome Metro) =

Rome metro station

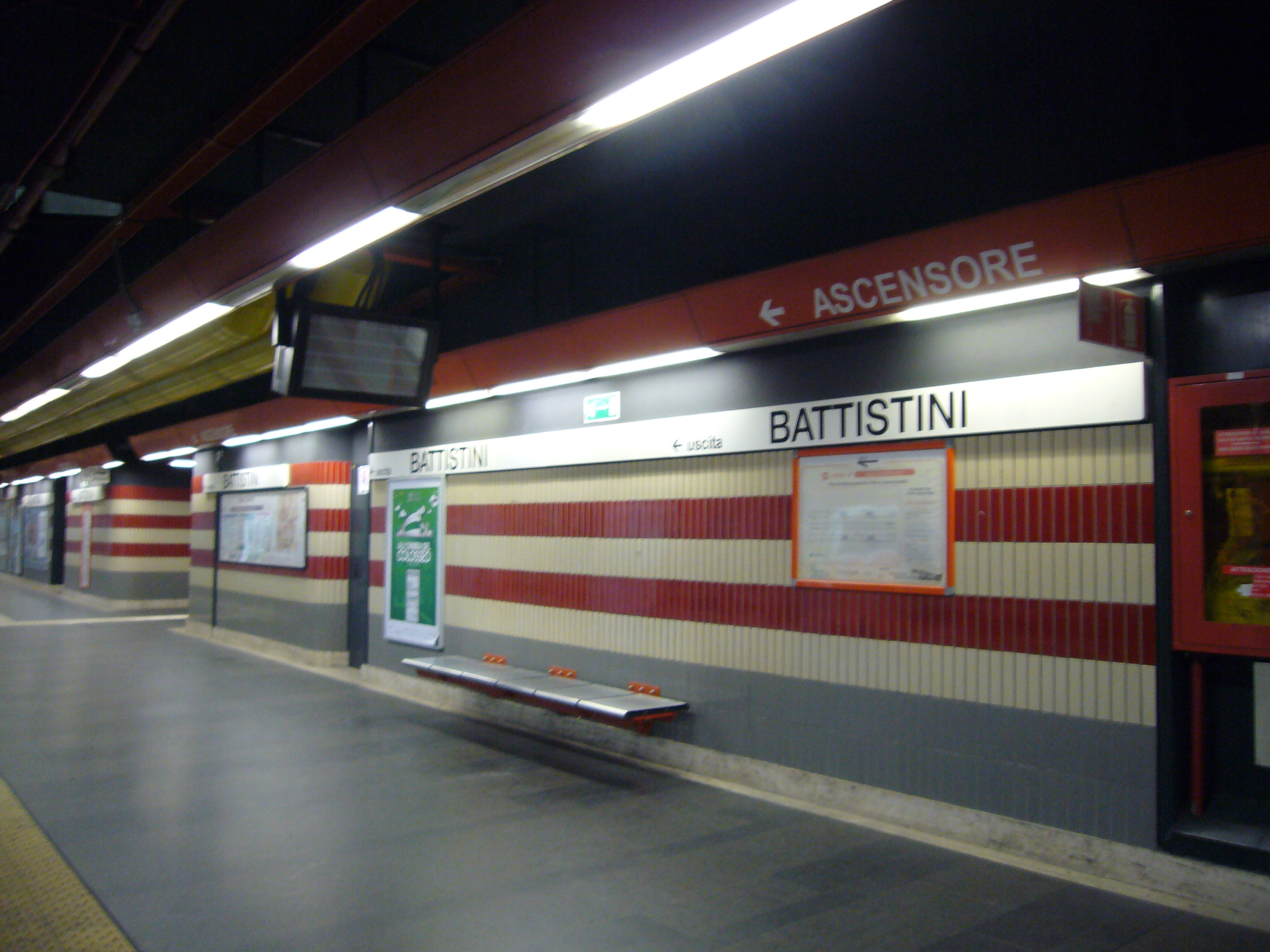

General information
- Coordinates: 41°54′23″N 12°24′53″E
- Owner: ATAC
- Tracks: 2

Construction
- Structure type: Underground

History
- Opened: 1 January 2000; 26 years ago

Services
Preceding station	Rome Metro	Following station
Terminus	Line A	Cornelia towards Anagnina
Location
- Click on the map to see marker

Battistini is an underground station on Line A of the Rome Metro, situated at the junction of Via Mattia Battistini and Via Ennio Bonifazi, in the 14th district. The station was inaugurated, together with the others from Valle Aurelia - Battistini on 1 January 2000 since when it has been the northernmost station on Line A.

== Services ==
This station has:

- Access for the disabled
- 177 Park and Ride spaces
- Ticket office
- Escalators

== Located nearby ==
- Via Boccea
- Forte Boccea
- Santa Sofia a Via Boccea
