= ATAC SpA =

Public Transport Society in Rome

ATAC

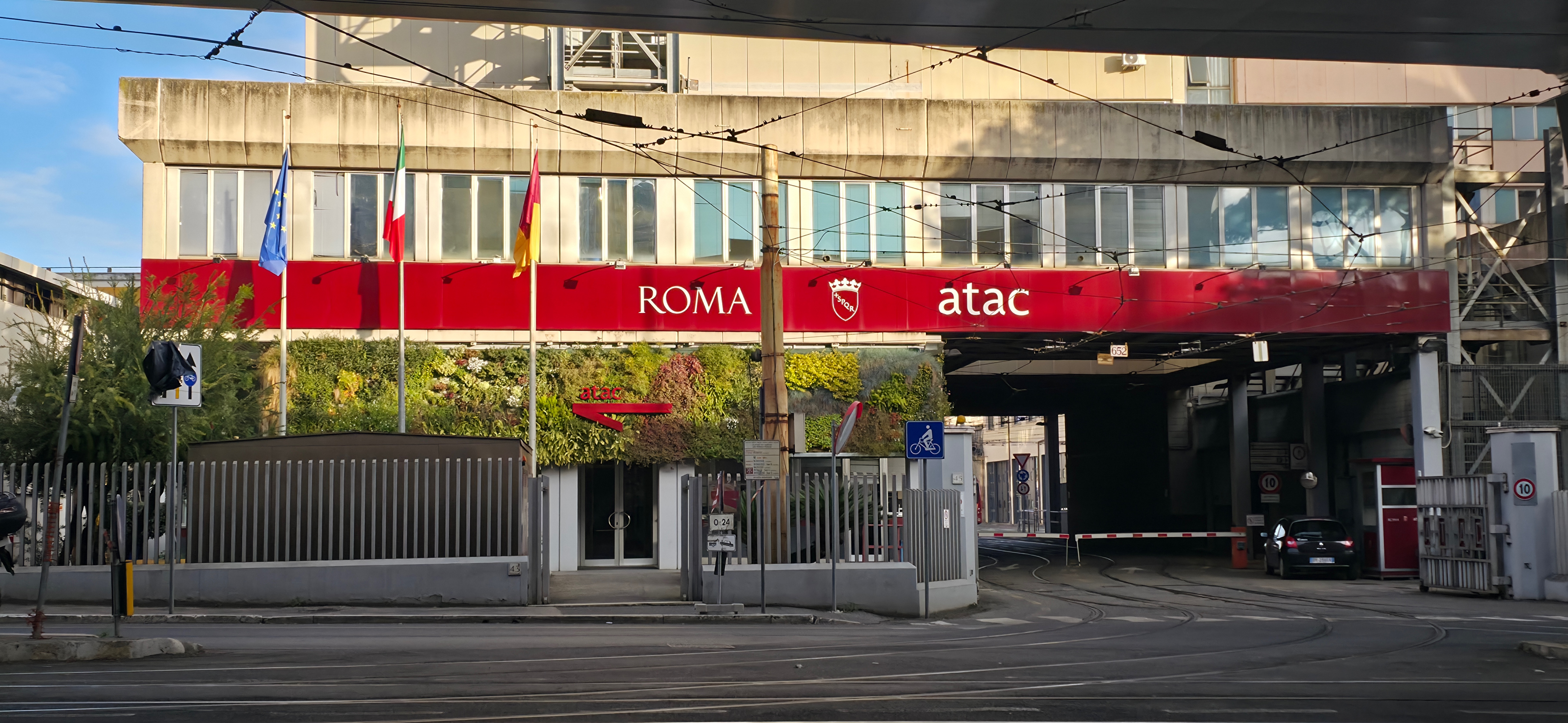
- ATAC headquarters in Rome
- Trade name: ATAC
- Native name: ATAC Azienda per la mobilità di Roma Capitale S.p.A.
- Formerly: AATM, ATM, ATAG
- Type: Società per azioni
- Industry: Public transport
- Founded: 1909; 117 years ago in Rome, Italy
- Founder: Ernesto Nathan
- Headquarters: Via Prenestina, 45, Rome, Italy
- Area served: Rome and Metropolitan City of Rome Capital
- Key people: Alessandro Rivera (President); Paolo Aielli (CEO)
- Revenue: 838,000,000 (2019)
- Net income: 7,612,009 (2019)
- Owner: Roma Capitale
- Number of employees: ▼10,531 (2022)
- Website: ATAC S.p.A.

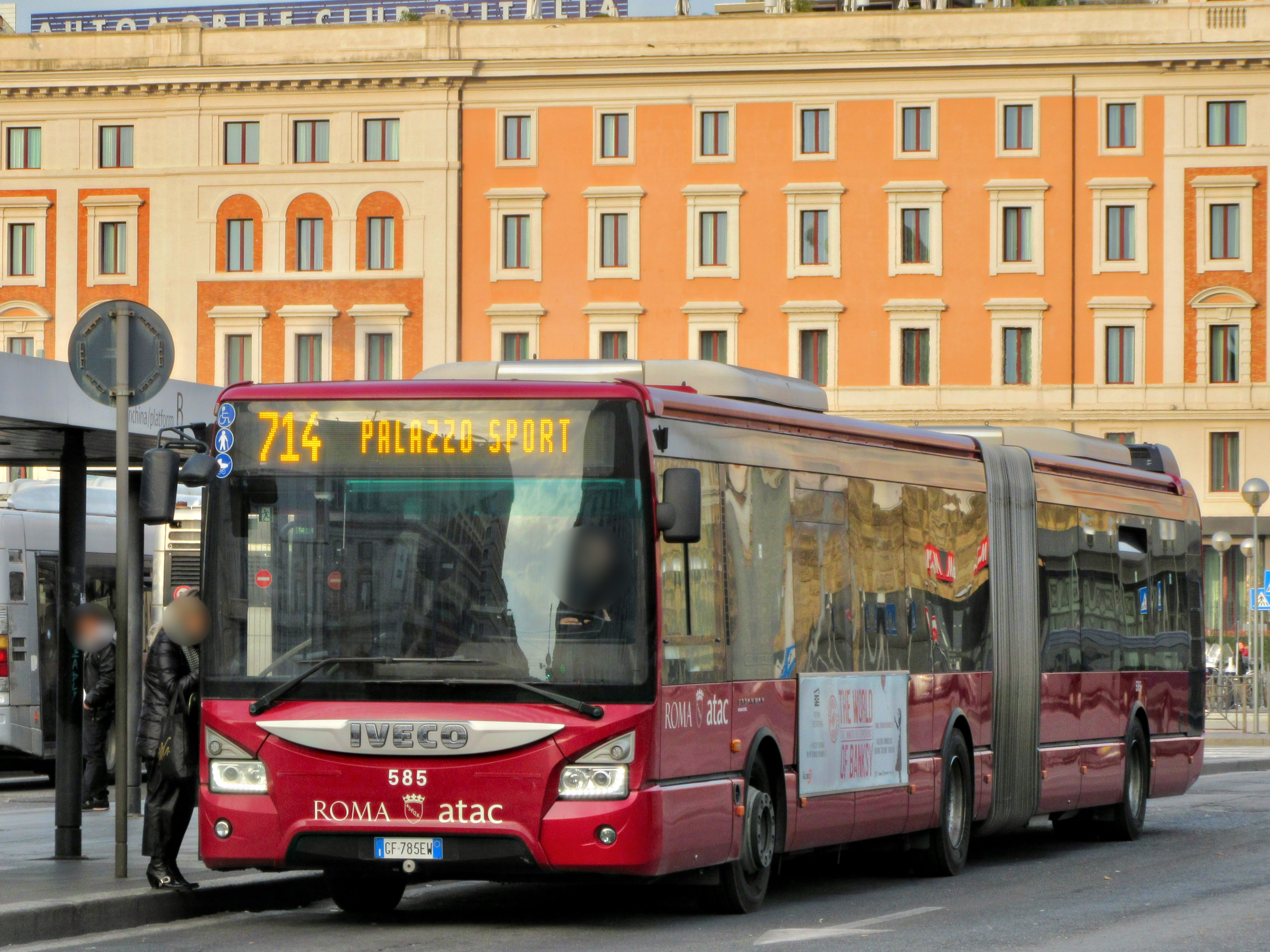
Iveco Urbanway articulated bus ATAC at Roma Termini

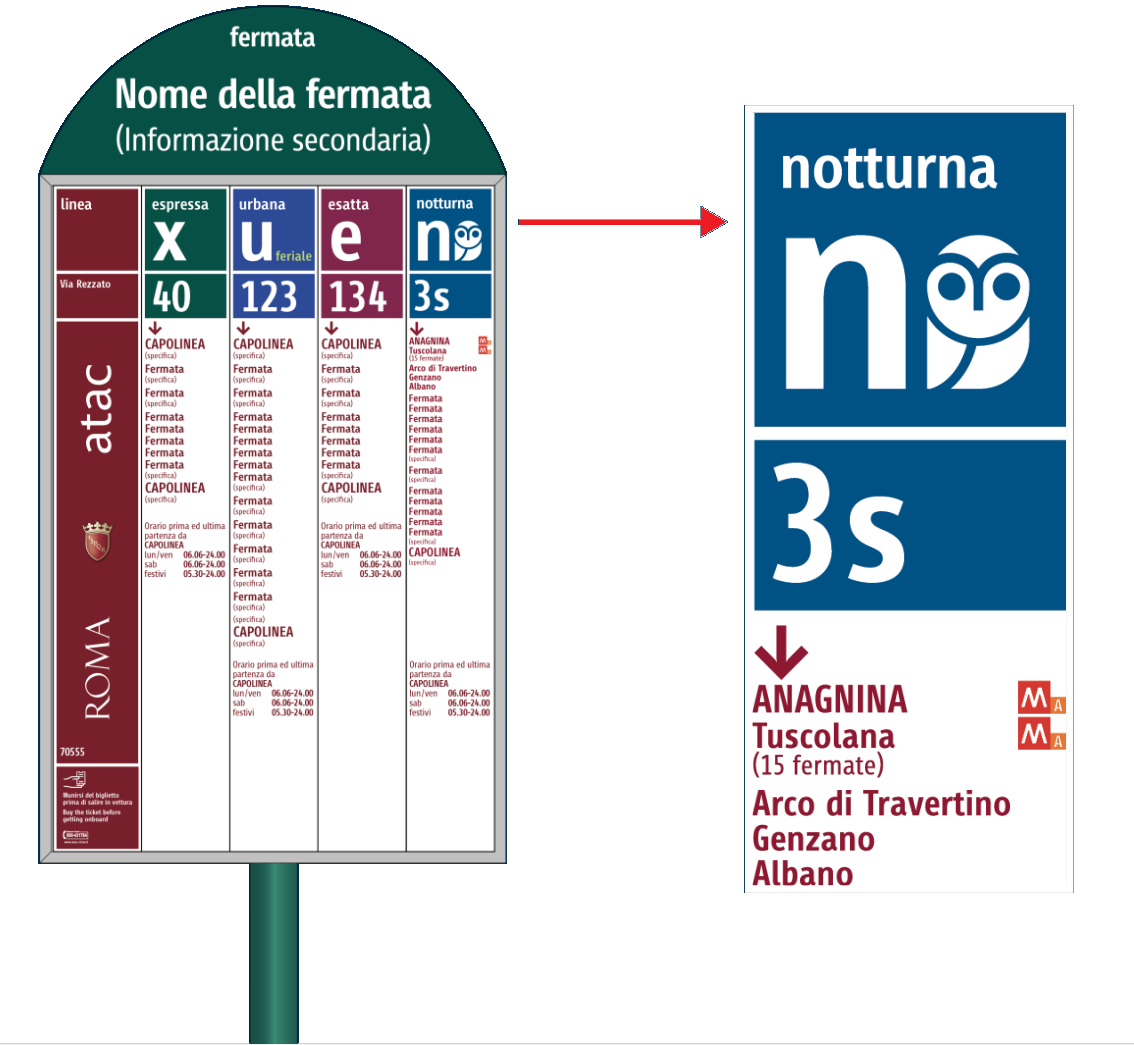
Graphics of a typical bus stop sign, in particular the "X" stands for express line, "u" for urban line, "e" for exact line, "n" for night line

ATAC Azienda per la mobilità di Roma Capitale S.p.A. (lit. 'Agency for Mobility in Rome Capital JSC'; formerly Azienda Tramvie e Autobus del Comune di Roma; lit. 'Tramway and Bus Agency of the City of Rome') is an Italian publicly owned company running most of the local public transportation services, paid parking and incentive parking lots in Rome. More specifically, the company handles, on behalf of Roma Capitale Authority, the entire tramway, trolleybus network and metro lines, as well as most of the bus lines in the city. ATAC S.p.A., with its 2,200-kilometer-wide public transport network, its over 8,500 busses and 70,000 parking stalls, is currently one of the biggest public transportation companies in Europe and the largest in Italy.

Founded in 1909 as AATM (Autonomous Municipal Tramway Company) in a bid to municipalise public means of transport in Rome, the company was reformed for the first time in 2000, when it was split into two separate components and turned into a mobility agency for the purpose of planning and coordinating public and private mobility in Rome. It was reorganised once again in 2010, when it was joined with the other two companies, Trambus and Met.Ro., both founded in 2000, back then also involved in public transportation in the city.

It participates, together with Cotral and Trenitalia, in the integrated Metrebus Roma fare system.

== Public transport in Rome before 1909 ==
Before 1909, public transportation in Rome, in contrast with other services such as waste collection, was not seen as a service that had to be directly provided, for free or upon payment of reduced fares, by public authorities. As a result, the first means of transport in Rome were offered after the beginning of the second half of the 19th century directly by private entrepreneurships, with the provision of carriages similar to those used by post delivery services, towed by either one or two horses and typically called omnibuses.

The first omnibus line in Rome was activated, probably around Jun 1845 as some sources suggest, to connect Piazza Venezia to Saint Paul Outside the Walls. On July 7, 1956, after the inauguration of the railway between Rome and Frascati (which was also the first railway owned by the Holy See), a new omnibus route between Piazza Venezia and the new train station, temporarily based in Porta Maggiore, was rolled out.

In spite of the many peculiarities pertaining to the private management of public means of transport in Rome during the 19th century, it is important to point out that the provision of omnibus lines was strictly regulated by the Holy See, that in fact, to promptly address this matter, issued the "Vehicle and other mean of transport Regulation" on July 30, 1857. According to this document, omnibus drivers had to own a specific license issued by the Municipality of Rome, along with a relevant authorisation provided by the Police General Directorate. In addition to that, omnibuses could only stop in specific areas and squares, also mandated by the ordinance.

The first omnibus service offered in its entirety within the residential area of Rome was inaugurated on February 20, 1866, connecting Piazza del Popolo to St. Peter's Square.

After 1870, when Rome was annexed to the rest of the state as a result of the Breach of Porta Pia, the first regulation concerning public means of transport within the capital was issued by the municipal administration in 1874, regulating the issue of licenses to both carriages (roughly equivalent to modern taxis) and omnibuses, as well as requirements for drivers, their conduct and standard characteristics of vehicles.

This by-law, if a comparison is made with the previous guidance provided by the Holy See, further expanded on the personnel aboard the omnibus. More specifically, it mandated the continuous presence onboard of a servant, apart from the driver. His main duties were "to sit down in the rear of the vehicle and in the designated spot located out of the carriage, provided with a whistle to be used for the purpose of signalling the driver to leave, and with a trumpet or hunting horn so as to advise passengers waiting at the station that the omnibus is either leaving or arriving". The Municipality of Rome also oversaw and had a say in the lines that omnibuses had to follow, as well as in the fares to be paid by passengers. In 1874, only 11 omnibus termini were authorised by the municipality and the vehicles in circulation could be 59 at the most.

A first step towards the municipalisation of public means of transport in Rome was taken in 1876 when the first convention with the "Omnibus Company of Rome" (in Italian, Società Romana degli Omnibus) was signed. The contract, renewed in 1885 and lasting 15 years, accounted for a reduction of fares for passengers, some minor changes to some routes and the implementation of some new lines.

In the meanwhile, Rome was also being strongly influenced by the ongoing wave of technological advancements spreading all over Europe at the time, and evidently also when it came to public transport. As a matter of fact, the first horse-drawn tramway suburban line between Piazza del Popolo and Ponte Milvio was introduced in 1877 by the "Societé Anonime des Tramways et Chemins de Fer Économiques", known as "the Belgian". The main innovation was that the motion of the horse-towed carriage was facilitated by the presence, on the ground, of a metal rail. After a little while, still in 1879, "steam tramways", connecting Rome to Tivoli, also went into service.

The "Omnibus Company of Rome", after the acquisition of tramways and several other routes formerly owned by other entrepreneurships, in 1886 reconstituted itself as the "Roman Tramways and Omnibus Company" (in Italian, Società Romana Tramways e Omnibus), also known as S.R.T.O.

Managing 11 omnibus lines and 9 horse-drawn tramways, S.R.T.O. started experimenting with a new electric tramway that, despite some technical and financial issues which were initially encountered, was successfully introduced within the end of the century, which still appears to be at a much later time than in most other European capital cities. Even though some experimental lines were installed along Via Flaminia out of Porta del Popolo and inaugurated by the king Umberto I of Italy on July 6, 1890, the actual introduction of electric tramways in the city of Rome dates back to 1895, when S.R.T.O. itself activated a line connecting the already-existing line in Termini with St. Silvestro, powered by an aerial cable.

Despite these technological advancements introduced at the turn of the century, several issues still permeated all means of transport handled by S.R.T.O. such as, to name a few, the shortage of vehicles and the high fares that the company could charge its customers being in an almost monopolistic setting, in a city that had already reached the threshold of half a million inhabitants between 1901 and 1911. As a result, in a bid to solve these complexities, the Municipality of Rome took into consideration the municipalisation of all public means of transport in the city.

== History ==
At the turn of the century, it was already clear that a private management of public means of transport was, in actual facts, beneficial to neither municipalities nor customers. As a matter of fact, the first could not take advantage of the revenues deriving from the service, neither could the latter benefit from lower fares if compared with the ones provided by private companies.

As a result, on March 29, 1903, Giolitti, an Italian politician and former Prime Minister, promoted a law commonly referred to as “Giolitti law on municipalisation” which regulated, for the first time in the history of the Kingdom of Italy, the management of public local services and the municipalisation thereof. This law, with many changes and integrations implemented over the years, is still partially in force after more than a century since its publication, even in the context of the Republic of Italy.

In the light of this newly-come facilitation of the process of municipalisation of a company allowed by the so-called “Giolitti law”, on May 13, 1908 Ernesto Nathan, at the time mayor of Rome, presented to the municipal council of the city a proposal for the “Creation and exercise of new tramway lines by the municipality”. This document didn't only thoroughly present the project and its peculiarities, but it also carried out an insightful analysis of the public transportation history in Rome coming to the foregone conclusion that shortages of services as well as other disruptions were mainly caused by the almost monopoly that the “Roman Tramways and Omnibus Company” (S.R.T.O) had hitherto gained. This proposal would shortly be followed by a more tangible “Municipal Tramway Network Plan” devised by the Technology Assessor Giovanni Montemarini, which was discussed and subsequently unanimously approved on March 20, 1908. After three years, on March 21, 1911, the first line connecting Piazza Colonna to the area of S. Croce was inaugurated.

After a while, by the end of 1908, also a “Municipal Electric Company” replacing the previously privately owned counterpart had been created, so as to provide not only the facilities but also the motor power needed for public means of transport to properly operate at a much lower price for the municipality itself. As a matter of fact, this municipalisation process led to a significant reduction in the price of tickets for members of the working class: a regular tram ticket cost 10 cents - much less than fares provided by S.R.T.O. - which was further reduced to 5 cents for workers between 5 and 8 A.M.

Established in 1909 as AATM (Autonomous Municipal Tramway), the company changed its name almost immediately to A.T.M. (Municipal Tramways Company).

In this regard, it is possible to have an insight into the organisational structure of the company by taking a close look at the regulatory document issued by A.T.M. itself in 1910. According to it, the company was led by a president, along with a so-called administrative commission appointed by the municipal council itself; there was also the important presence of a technical director, typically an engineer selected on the basis of the outcome of a competition, who directed both the administrative and the technical division of the company. Technical services were further subdivided into 5 specific sectors: motion, storage, warehouse, repair shop, maintenance, and traction. The forementioned document also accounted for further requirements such as administrative transparency criteria and social legal protection, principles that lied at the heart of both hirings and fair financial attitude towards workers. To further underpin this aim, the company annually held a course for prospective drivers. When it came to hiring new personnel, the company often required previous working experience as well as a piece of identity proof, along with different study titles depending on the role held by the worker within the company (ranging roughly from elementary school certificates for drivers to high school diplomas, which made for a strict requirement for administrative personnel and accountants). The number of working hours per week was 63, which could further decrease as per the right to obtain further leaves, with a paid day off every 15 days at work, which were to be added to additional 10 guaranteed, paid days off per year. While team leaders and inspectors could receive a daily salary of up to 6 lire, the greatest wage for drivers was 4 lire, whereas the one of a worker could reach 4.50 lire and that of a messenger 3.70 lire.

In 1919, ATM began to gradually absorb SRTO's lines and rolling stock, becoming the dominant transit company in Rome.

In 1926, the Governorate of Rome, which replaced the city, was established. Consequently, ATM changed its name to ATG, and two years later, with the establishment of the first bus lines, the ATG became ATAG (Bus and Tramways Company of the governorate).

On December 21, 1929, the SRTO closed down as it only ran a single line. All of its fleet was transferred to the ATAG, which implemented a radical reform of the network by removing all the tram lines within the city centre and replacing them with buses from 1 January 1930. After the reform the network was structured on a series of radial lines which originated from a circular internal loop and were interconnected by a circular outer loop.

On 8 January 1937, the first two trolleybuses, 137 and 138, came into service in the Flaminio district.

On August 9, 1944, the city returned to its original status, so the ATAG became ATAC. It started to tackle the difficult task of rebuilding the network and the fleet. For the first two years of the post-war period a minimum service was provided by "trucks," and then in February 1947, ATAC restored the first 6 lines. The return to the pre-war network was not achieved until 1948.

In the 1950s, the highway network in Italy expanded, which caused train ridership to decrease.

In July 1972, the last trolleybus line (47) was closed.

In 2000, ATAC underwent further transformation: it has only retained ownership of the facilities, tram and trolleybus and deposits, while selling the task of managing the business to external concessionaires. The management of most of the lines of Rome is assigned to the Tramway, which is wholly owned by the City of Rome. Some private companies have won the public tender for the management of other local lines, mostly peripheral ones.

== Tram services ==
The following tram routes are operated by ATAC. All of them are considered urban routes (U letter and blue sign).

- Piazzale Flaminio-Piazza Mancini
- Roma Trastevere railway station-Valle Giulia
- Termini-Piazza dei Gerani
- Casaletto-Piazza Venezia
- Termini-Togliatti
- Risorgimento/Piazza San Pietro-Piazza dei Gerani

=== Tram-train ===
- Rome-Giardinetti railway (The line closed in April 2026 to undergoing a transformation to a tram line).

== Trolleybus services ==
Rome's trolleybus services is made up of three lines and is also managed by ATAC.

- 60 Piazza Venezia–Largo Pugliese (technically not a trolleybus route, but uses trolleybuses on a few runs, using the overhead wires of route 90)
- 74 Laurentina metro station–Via Rita Brunetti
- 90 Termini station–Largo Labia

Planned lines:

- 72 Laurentina–Via Guglielmo Guasta (planned for eventual conversion to trolleybus; currently still served by buses)
- 73 Piazzale dell'Agricoltura–Via Guglielmo Guasta (planned for eventual conversion to trolleybus; currently still served by buses)

== Underground services ==
Rome's underground is made up by three lines and is also managed by ATAC.

- Line A: Battistini (Rome Metro)-Termini-Anagnina (Rome Metro)
- Line B: Laurentina (Rome Metro)-Termini-Rebibbia (Rome Metro)
- Line B1: Laurentina (Rome Metro)-Termini-Jonio (Rome Metro)
- Line C: Colosseo (Rome Metro)-Monte Compatri-Pantano (Rome Metro)

== Urban bus services ==
ATAC, Autoservizi Troiani, Tuscia, ATR and BIS operates various bus routes around Rome. They are identified as Urban (U), Esatta (E), and Express (X).

=== 0-99 ===
- H Termini-Dei Capasso
- 16 XX Settembre-Costamagna
- 23 Piazzale Clodio-Pincherle/Parravano
- 31 Piazzale Clodio-Laurentina
- 32 Ottaviano/Piazza San Pietro-Saxa Rubra Railway station
- 33 Piazzale Clodio-Lenin
- 33D Bravetta/Scrovegni-Montalcini (Scholastic Diverted Route)
- 34 Circular Route Paola
- 38 Termini-Porta di Roma
- 44 Montalcini-Teatro Marcello
- 46 Piazza Venezia-Monte Mario Railway Station
- 46B Battistini/Soria-Rosi
- 49 Piazza Cavour-San Filippo Neri Hospital
- 52 Circular Route Archimede-Tritone/Fontana di Trevi
- 53 Circular Route Piazza Mancini-Tritone/Fontana di Trevi
- 61 Balsamo Crivelli-Villa Borghese/Washington
- 62 Roma Tiburtina railway station-Roma San Pietro railway station
- 63 Piazza Monte Savello-Rossellini
- 64 Termini-Roma San Pietro railway station
- 66 Termini-Marx
- 69 Piazzale Clodio-Largo Pugliese
- 70 Piazzale Clodio-Giolitti
- 71 Circular Route Roma Tiburtina railway station
- 75 Indipendenza-Poerio/Marino
- 77 Circular Route Piazzale Ostiense/Piramide
- 81 Malatesta-Risorgimento/Piazza San Pietro
- 82 Circular Route Montesacro-Termini
- 83 Largo Valsabbia-Partigiani
- 85 Termini-Arco di Travertino
- 86 Pelagosa-Canetti
- 86P Baseggio-Eretum (Prolonged Scholastic Route)
- 87 Largo Colli Albani-Giulio Cesare/Lepanto
- 88 Largo Labia-Verano
- 89 Piazzale Clodio-Bressanone/Sant'Agnese Annibaliano
- 92 Termini-Marliana
- 93 Prati Fiscali/Jonio-Monte San Giusto
- 96 Reduzzi-Partigiani
- 98 Mazzacurati-Paola

=== 100-199 ===
- 100 Circular Route Porta Pinciana-Via del Corso
- 104 Circular Route Parco di Centocelle-Malatesta
- 105 Circular Route Parco di Centocelle-Termini
- 105L Circular Route Parco di Centocelle-Pigneto
- 106 Grotte Celoni-Parco di Centocelle
- 107 Mondavio-Grotte Celoni
- 111 Circular Route Roma Tiburtina railway station
- 113 Circular Route Largo Preneste
- 115 Circular Route Paola
- 117 Circular Route Piazza San Giovanni in Laterano
- 118/118D Circular Route Appia/Via dei Quintili
- 119 Circular Route Piazza Venezia
- 128/128L Crocco-Baldelli
- 135 Salaria/Piombino-Roma Tiburtina railway Station
- 146 Mombasiglio-Pineta Sacchetti/Gemelli
- 160 Montagnola-Villa Borghese/Washington
- 163 Rebibbia-Verano
- 168 Largo Maresciallo Diaz-Roma Tiburtina railway station
- 170 Termini-Piazzale dell'Agricoltura
- 188 Circular Route Largo Maresciallo Diaz

=== 200-299 ===
- 200 Piazza Mancini-Prima Porta Railway Station
- 201 Piazza Mancini-Conti Antonio/Pullè
- 201D Piazza Mancini-Venezuela/India (Scholastic Diverted Route)
- 211 Roma Tiburtina railway station-Cimone/Monte Acero
- 211F Cimone/Monte Acero-Pietralata
- 213 Cinecittà-Largo Preneste
- 218 Porta San Giovanni-Ardeatina/Scuola Padre Formato
- 223 Termini-La Giustiniana Railway Station
- 226/226D Piazza Mancini-Grottarossa/Istituto Asisium
- 228 Circular Route Roma Trastevere railway station
- 230 Moschea/Forte Antenne-Sacro Cuore di Maria/Euclide
- 235 Largo Labia-Bressanone/Sant'Agnese Annibaliano
- 246 Cornelia-Malagrotta
- 246P Cornelia-Castel di Guido-Aurelia (Prolonged Route)
- 247 Roma Aurelia railway station-Cipro (Rome Metro)
- 252 Circular Route Policlinico (Rome Metro)-Acqua Acetosa Railway Station
- 280 Piazza Mancini-Partigiani

=== 300-399 ===
- 301 Giulio Cesare/Lepanto-Grottarossa/Istituto Asisium
- 303 La Giustiniana Railway Station-Prima Porta Railway Station
- 309 Santa Maria del Soccorso-Roma Tiburtina railway station
- 310 Termini-Vescovio
- 311 Rebibbia-Largo Valsabbia
- 313 Torre Maura-Longoni
- 313D Longoni-Largo Preneste (Scholastic Diverted Route)
- 314 Largo Preneste-Rotello
- 319 Circular Route Balsamo Crivelli
- 334 Grottarossa ATAC Depot-Baseggio
- 336 Val d'Ala-Quarrata
- 337 Pelagosa-Via Manzoni/Tor Lupara
- 338/338D Val d'Aosta/Nomentana Railway Station-Marmorale
- 339 Circular Route Porro Lambertenghi
- 340 Dante da Maiano-Marmorale
- 340D Dante da Maiano-Eretum (Prolonged Scholastic Route)
- 341 Ponte Mammolo-Sassofeltrio/Fidene Railway Station
- 343/343D Ponte Mammolo-Valtournanche
- 344/344D Eretum-Nuovo Salario Railway Station
- 349 Circular Route Porro Lambertenghi
- 350 Ponte Mammolo-Nuovo Salario Railway station
- 351 Antamoro G./Castellani-Largo Somalia
- 360 Muse-Zama

=== 400-499 ===
- 404/404D Rebibbia-San Giovanni in Argentella
- 409 Arco di Travertino-Roma Tiburtina railway station
- 412 Adria-Olevano Romano
- 424 Circular Route Ponte Mammolo
- 435 Porta di Roma-Val di Lanzo
- 435D Val di Lanzo-Dante da Maiano
- 437 Circular Route Rebibbia
- 441 Roma Tiburtina railway station-Casale Rocchi
- 443 Circular Route Rebibbia
- 444 Ponte Mammolo-Bonifacio F.P.
- 445 Bologna-Curioni
- 446 Cornelia-Piazza Mancini
- 447/447D Circular Route Rebibbia
- 448 Circular Route Balsamo Crivelli
- 450 Monti Tiburtini/Pertini-Alessandrino
- 451 Ponte Mammolo-Cinecittà
- 490 Cornelia-Roma Tiburtina railway station
- 492 Cipro (Rome Metro)-Roma Tiburtina railway station
- 495 Roma Tiburtina railway station-Valle Aurelia

=== 500-599 ===
- 500 Anagnina-Torre Angela
- 502 Carnevale-Cinecittà
- 503 Circular Route Anagnina
- 504 Circular Route Anagnina
- 505 Circular Route Anagnina
- 506 Anagnina-Grotte Celoni
- 507 Anagnina-Grotte Celoni
- 508 Mondavio-Ponte Mammolo
- 509 Anagnina-Fosso del Cavaliere/CNR
- 515 Anagnina-Kennedy/Ciampino railway station
- 520 Circular Route Cinecittà (Rome Metro)-Rome Ciampino Airport
- 533 Circular Route Anagnina
- 541 Fillia-Malatesta
- 542 Piazza delle Camelie-Verano
- 543 Gardenie-Vertunni/Salcito
- 544 Bressanone/Sant'Agnese Annibaliano-Parco di Centocelle
- 545 San Luca Evangelista-Verano
- 546 Ago/Val Cannuta-Ipogeo degli Ottavi Railway Station
- 548 Roma Tiburtina railway station-Cinecittà
- 551 Anagnina-Vigne di Morena
- 552 Gerani/Rododendri-Policlinico/Tor Vergata
- 555 Pantano-Ponte di Nona
- 556 Gardenie-Anagnina
- 557 Piazza Cardinali-Vignali/Scintu
- 558 Gardenie-Cinecittà
- 559 Anagnina-Cinecittà
- 590 Risorgimento/Piazza San Pietro-Cinecittà

=== 600-699 ===
- 628 Baronio-Volpi/Farnesina
- 649 Roma Tiburtina railway station-Zama
- 654 Circular Route Campo Farnia
- 657 Arco di Travertino-Vignali/Scintu
- 660 Circular Route Arco di Travertino
- 663 Cirò-Largo Colli Albani
- 664 Circular Route Largo Colli Albani
- 665 Circular Route Piazza San Giovanni in Laterano
- 669 Circular Route Pincherle/Parravano
- 670 Circular Route Pincherle/Parravano
- 671 Arco di Travertino-Nervi/Palazzo Sport

=== 700-799 ===
- 700 Chianesi-EUR Fermi
- 701 Lenin-Sabbadino
- 702 Laurentina-Torre Sant'Anastasia
- 705 EUR Fermi-Piermarini
- 706 EUR Fermi-Rotellini
- 708/708D Agricoltura-Versari
- 709 EUR Fermi-Timocle
- 710 Carini-Lenin
- 711 Circular Route Villa Bonelli
- 712 EUR Fermi-Ortolani
- 713 Circular Route Bosco Arvali
- 714 Termini-Nervi/Palazzo Sport
- 715 Teatro Marcello-Tiberio Imperatore
- 716 Teatro Marcello-Viale Ballarin
- 719 Crocco/Mercanti-Partigiani
- 720 Circular Route Laurentina (Rome Metro)-Rome Ciampino Airport
- 721 Circular Route Castello della Cecchignola
- 723 Circular Route Laurentina
- 724 Agricoltura-Gadda
- 731 Valgrisi-Eroi di Rodi
- 731D Brunetti-Eroi di Rodi/Console (Scholastic Diverted Route)
- 762 Circular Route Agricoltura
- 763 Laurentina-Castello della Cecchignola
- 763D Agricoltura-Castello della Cecchignola (Scholastic Diverted Route)
- 764 Agricoltura-Londra
- 765 Arco di Travertino-Laurentina
- 765D Laurentina-Grotte d'Arcaccio/Scuole (Scholastic Diverted Route)
- 766 Millevoi-Roma Trastevere railway station
- 767 Circular Route Agricoltura
- 769 Londra-Piazzale Ostiense/Piramide
- 771 America-Viola
- 772 Circular Route EUR Fermi
- 773 Bosco Arvali-Roma Trastevere railway station
- 774 Montalcini/Ripandelli-Roma Trastevere railway station
- 775 Piazzale Ostiense/Piramide-Nazzani
- 777 Agricoltura-Beata Vergine del Carmelo
- 778 America-Beata Vergine del Carmelo
- 779/779F Circular Route Agricoltura
- 780 Nervi/Palazzo Sport-Partigiani
- 781 Piazza Venezia-Magliana/Scarperia
- 786 Reduzzi-Roma Trastevere railway station
- 786D Roma Trastevere railway station-Dei Capasso (Scholastic Diverted Route)
- 786F Roma Trastevere railway station-Bosco Arvali (Public Holidays Only)
- 787 Val Fiorita-Bertasi Bonelli
- 788 Agricoltura-Brunetti
- 789 America-Cinecittà
- 789F Circular Route America (Public Holidays Only)
- 791 Cornelia-Nervi/Palazzo Sport
- 792 San Giovanni Eudes-Porta San Giovanni
- 795 Circular Route Valgrisi

=== 800-899 ===
- 808/808D Dei Capasso-Eiffel
- 870/870D Paola-Trullo
- 871 Circular Route Roma Trastevere railway station
- 881 Paola-Avanzini/Quartiere Incis
- 882 Circular Route Gianicolense/Casaletto
- 889 Ago/Val Cannuta-Mazzacurati
- 892 Valle Aurelia-Aldobrandeschi

=== 900-999 ===
- 904/904D Cornelia-Bedeschi
- 905 Cornelia-Malagrotta
- 906 Casale Lumbroso/Fontebasso-Valle Aurelia
- 907 Cornelia-La Giustiniana Railway Station
- 907L Cornelia-Pineta Sacchetti/Gemelli
- 908/908D Grondona-Gasparri P.
- 910 Indipendenza-Piazza Mancini
- 911 Piazza Mancini-San Filippo Neri Hospital
- 912 Circular Route Montemario Railway Station
- 913 Cavour-Montemario Railway Station
- 913L Dalla Chiesa-Montemario Railway Station
- 916/916F Piazza Venezia-Andersen
- 916D Barellai-Mombasiglio (Diverted Scholastic Route)
- 980 San Filippo Neri Hospital-Pane A.
- 981 Candoni ATAC Depot-Cornelia
- 982 Roma Quattro Venti railway station-XVII Olimpiade
- 983 Circular Route Cornelia
- 985 Eugenio Frate-Roma Aurelia railway station
- 990 Lungotevere Marzio-Montemario Railway Station
- 990L Circular Route Cipro (Rome Metro)
- 992 Circular Route Ipogeo degli Ottavi Railway Station
- 993 Cornelia-Ipogeo degli Ottavi Railway Station
- 998 Ponderano-Montemario Railway Station
- 999 Circular Route Montemario Railway Station

=== 01-099 ===
- 01 Circular Route Piazzale Stazione del Lido
- 01D Circular Route Marianne (Scholastic Diverted Route)
- 03 Circular Route Altamura/Bertolla
- 04 Piazzale Stazione del Lido-Villani/Cupole
- 04B Circular Ostiense/Acilia Railway Station
- 04D Piazzale Stazione del Lido-Saponara/Fosso del Dragoncello (Scholastic Diverted Route)
- 05/05P Idroscalo/Bastimenti-Mar Rosso/Mar Glaciale Artico
- 05B Ebridi/Mercato-Mar Rosso/Mar Glaciale Artico
- 06 Piazzale Stazione del Lido-Wolf Ferrari/Bazzini
- 07 Cristoforo Colombo Railway Station-Litoranea/Villaggio Tognazzi
- 08 Antifane/Isola 46-Monti San Paolo/Conforti
- 09 Circular Route Castel Bolognese/Vitinia Railway Station
- 011 Circular Route Umberto I/Castello
- 012 Circular Route Ostiense/Acilia Railway Station
- 013 Nino Taranto-Mellano/Reggiolo
- 014 Piazzale Stazione del Lido-Antifane/Isola 46
- 016 Monti San Paolo/Conforti-Antifane/Isola 46
- 016F Monti San Paolo/Conforti-Torcegno/Castel Porziano (Public Holidays Only)
- 017 Circular Route Ostiense/Acilia Railway Station
- 018 Circular Route Umberto I/Castello
- 020 Circular Route Prima Porta Railway Station
- 021 Grottarossa/Istituto Asisium-La Giustiniana Railway Station
- 022 Grottarossa/Istituto Asisium-Prima Porta Railway Station
- 024 Circular Route Via della Stazione di Cesano-Anguillarese/Asl Casaccia
- 025 Mombasiglio-Formichi
- 027 Rivoli-Borgo Ticino
- 028 San Basilide-Roma Aurelia railway station
- 029 Largo Sperlonga-Saxa Rubra Railway Station
- 030 Tragliatella/Civico 225-La Storta Railway Station
- 031 La Giustiniana Railway Station-Piedicavallo
- 032 Circular Route La Storta Railway Station
- 033 Prima Porta Railway Station-Santa Cornelia/Brenna
- 035 Prima Porta Railway Station-Borgo Pineto
- 036 La Storta Railway Station-Cesano Borgo
- 037 Fiesse-Prima Porta Railway Station
- 038 Saxa Rubra Railway Station-Valbondione
- 039 Salaria/Piombino-Saxa Rubra Railway Station
- 040 Ponte Mammolo-Fadda
- 040F Ponte Mammolo-Alba Adriatica/Barisciano (Public Holidays Only)
- 041 Ponte Mammolo-Alba Adriatica/Barisciano
- 041F Ponte Mammolo-Fadda (Public Holidays Only)
- 042 Cerquete/Portocannone-Mondavio
- 042P Cerquete/Portocannone-Mondavio-San Vittorino (Prolonged Route)
- 043 Rebibbia-Ortucchio
- 045 Ortona de’ Marsi-Grotte Celoni
- 046 Circular Route Anagnina
- 047 Circular Route Anagnina
- 048 Papiri-Betti/Civico 65
- 049 Bisaccia-Alessandrini
- 051 Grotte Celoni-Cerquete/Portocannone
- 051L Grotte Celoni-Mazzolari/Romero (Limited Scholastic Route)
- 052 Circular Route Pantano
- 053 Marelli/Necchi-Torrenova/Bitonto
- 054 Pantano-Colle Mattia
- 055 Pantano-D'Ascanio
- 056 Raimondi M.-Roccalumera/Borghesiana
- 057/057D Circular Route Grotte Celoni
- 058/058D Ponte Mammolo-Tor Vergata/Medicina
- 058F Grotte Celoni-Longoni/INPS (Public Holidays Only)
- 059 Mitelli-Policlinico/Tor Vergata
- 060 Piazzale Stazione del Lido-Aeroporto di Fiumicino (actually suspended)
- 062 Baffigo/Mastrangelo-Cristoforo Colombo Railway Station (Summer Seasons Only)
- 063 Circular Route Ostiense/Acilia Railway Station
- 065 Altamura/Bertolla-Wolf Ferrari/Bazzini
- 066 Circular Route Cristoforo Colombo Railway Station
- 070 EUR Fermi-Cristoforo Colombo Railway Station
- 071 Circular Route Brunetti
- 073 Brunetti-Strampelli
- 074 Brunetti-Papiri
- 075/075D Ponte Mammolo-Tonino Bello
- 078/078D Caduti Liberazione-Tarantelli
- 081 Circular Route Sabbadino
- 088/088F Della Giovanna I./Zoo Grunwald-Gianicolense/Casaletto
- 089 Casale Lumbroso/Fontebasso-Portuense/Ex Dazio

=== C1 ===
- C1 Circular Route Montebello Railway Station-Prima Porta Cemetery

== Express bus services ==
=== 0-99 ===
- 20 Anagnina-Cambellotti
- 20L Circular Route Anagnina (Limited Route)
- 30 Piazzale Clodio-Laurentina
- 40 Circular Route Termini
- 51 Circular Route San Giovanni in Laterano-Colosseo-Piazza Venezia-Tritone/Fontana di Trevi
- 80 Piazza Venezia-Porta di Roma
- 90 Termini-Labia park
- 91 Circular Route Battistini

=== 100-199 ===
- 120F Recanati-Villa Borghese/Washington (Public Holidays Only)
- 150F Tonino Bello-Villa Borghese/Washington (Public Holidays Only)
- 180F Dalla Chiesa-Mazzacurati (Public Holidays Only)
- 190F Piazza Venezia-Mombasiglio (Public Holidays Only)

== Exact bus services ==
=== C1-C19 ===
- C2 Termini-Flaminio Cemetery
- C3 Roma Tiburtina railway station-Flaminio Cemetery
- C4 Piazzale Stazione del Lido-Flaminio Cemetery
- C5 Piazza delle Camelie-Montebello Railway Station
- C6 Baldelli-Flaminio Cemetery
- C7 Laurentina-Flaminio Cemetery
- C8 Baldelli-Laurentino Cemetery
- C9 Romanisti/Marforio-San Vittorino
- C11 Cinecittà-Laurentino Cemetery
- C13 Piazzale Stazione del Lido-Laurentino Cemetery
- C19 Piazzale Stazione del Lido-Ostia Antica Cemetery

== Night bus services ==
=== Urban railways and underground replacement services ===
- nMA Anagnina-Battistini/Soria
- nMB Laurentina-Rebibbia
- nMB1 Termini-Jonio
- nMC Piazza Venezia-Pantano
- nME Piazza Venezia-Lido di Ostia Centro Railway Station

=== Other lines ===
- n551 Circular Route Anagnina
- n90 Piazza Venezia-Montegiberto/Piagge
- n46 Termini-Monte Mario Railway Station
- n913 Piazza Venezia-Tarsia
- n70 Piazzale Clodio-Termini
- n8 Dei Capasso-Termini
- n716 Termini-Laurentina
- n3d Circular Route Piazzale Ostiense/Piramide
- n3s Circular Route Piazzale Ostiense/Piramide
- n5 Piazza Venezia-Togliatti/Palme
- n543 Piazza Venezia-Vertunni/Salcito
- n92 Termini-Sempione
- n719 Roma Trastevere railway station-Candoni ATAC Depot
- n98 Termini-Mazzacurati
- n781 Roma Trastevere railway station-Magliana/Scarperia
- n409 Roma Tiburtina railway station-Colli Albani
- n11 Piazza Venezia-Grotte Celoni
- n904 Piazza Venezia-Bedeschi
- n705 Laurentina-Piermarini
- n66 Termini-Marx
- n041 Roma Tiburtina railway station-Alba Adriatica
- n200 Piazza Mancini-Prima Porta Railway Station
- n201 Piazza Venezia-Conti Antonio/Pullè
- n500 Cinecittà-Policlinico/Tor Vergata
- n74 Circular Route Laurentina
- n070 Piazzale dell'Agricoltura-Lido di Ostia Centro Railway Station
- n075 Largo Preneste-Tonino Bello

== Bus fleet ==
=== Urban buses, midbuses, and minibuses ===
- 48-49 Tecnobus Gulliver U520 (not on route services, but operating as mobile ticket offices)
- 241-270 Iveco Daily Indcar Mobi
- 631-690 Tecnobus Gulliver U520 ESP New
- 701-800 Mercedes-Benz O530 C2 Citaro Hybrid (under delivery)
- 1301-1320 IIA Menarinibus Citymood 10
- 1642 Iveco 200E.9.27 Europolis
- 1721-1754, 1756–1778, 1780-1799 Autodromo (CAM) Alè (2 doors)
- 2001-2070 Irisbus 200E.9.13 Europolis
- 2101-2175 IIA Menarinibus Citymood 12 (2 doors)
- 2201-2241 IIA Menarinibus Citymood 12 (3 doors)
- 2301-2325 IIA Menarinibus Citymood 12 CNG (2 doors)
- 2401-2466 IIA Menarinibus Citymood 12 CNG (3 doors)
- 3001-3206 Irisbus Citelis 12
- 3301-3430, 3471-3485 Iveco Bus Urbanway 12
- 3721-3954 Iveco 491E.12.29 CityClass Cursor
- 4101-4500 Irisbus 491E.12.27 CityClass Cursor CNG
- 4501-4524 Irisbus Citelis 12 CNG
- 5001-5500 Iveco 491E.12.29 CityClass Cursor
- 5822-5846 Iveco Daily (5843 was converted into a mobile ticket office)
- 5901-6000 Iveco 491E.12.29 CityClass Cursor
- 7501-7618, 7620–7621, 7623, 7626–7644, 7649, 7657-7700 Mercedes-Benz O530N Citaro (3 doors)
- 8101-8113, 815–8128, 8130, 8132, 8151–8159, 8161-8201 Mercedes-Benz O530N Citaro (2 doors)

=== Trolleybuses ===
These are used on Express Routes 60 (occasionally) and 90, and on Urban Route 74:

- 8501-8530 Solaris Ganz Trollino II 18
- 8601-8645 BredaMenarinibus Avancity+ S HTB

The BredaMenarinibus Avancity+ HTB were part of a controversy of misuse of public funds by the Gianni Alemanno's and Ignazio Marino's mayoral terms. In fact, they had been originally purchased in 2009 to operate into a new trolleybus line at the EUR, but had remained unused inside the Tor Pagnotta bus depot for years, before making their official debut in 2016 on routes 60 and 90 and, since 2019, on route 74.

=== Interurban buses and buses for private hire ===
- 1851 DAF SB4000 Dallavia Palladio TH
- 6001-6183 Mercedes-Benz O530 Citaro NÜ

=== Urban bendy buses ===
- 401-531 Irisbus Citelis 18 EEV
- 551-590 Iveco Urbanway 18

=== Former bus and bendy bus fleet ===
==== Purchased between 1960 and 1979 ====
- 01-80 Lancia 703.04 Pistoiesi (demolished)
- 101-109, 158–172, 241-275 Lancia 718.301 Esagamma Portesi (demolished)
- 110-118, 143-157 Lancia 718.301 Esagamma SEAC (demolished)
- 119-142, 173-240 Lancia 718.301 Esagamma Pistoiesi (demolished)
- 276-301 Lancia 718.241 Esagamma Portesi (demolished)
- 1600-1629, 1720-1744 Fiat 314 Portesi
  - no. 1605-1613 and 1725 were sold to Rossi Bus Autoservizi Roma in 1992
  - no. 1614, 1722 and 1736 were sold to Corsi e Pampanelli Roma in 1992
  - the rest were demolished
- 1700-1719 Fiat 314 Menarini
  - 1705 and 1715 were sold to CAT Tivoli in 1986
  - 1708 and 1716 were sold to SAP Guidonia in 1988
  - the rest were demolished
- 1778-1797 Fiat 414 Cansa (demolished)
- 2735-2967 (only odd numbers) Fiat 410 OM
  - no. 2745, 2779, 2791, 2803 and 2825 were sold to the Pomezia municipality in 1975 and 1976
  - the rest were demolished
- 2969-2975 (only odd numbers) Fiat 410 Viberti (demolished)
- 2977-2985 (only odd numbers) Fiat 410 Mater (demolished)
- 3001-3140 Fiat 410 Cameri (demolished)
- 3141-3150 Fiat 410 Piaggio (demolished)
- 3151-3210, 3246-3269 Fiat 410 Cansa (demolished)
- 3211-3245, 3270-3285 Fiat 410 Pistoiesi (demolished)
- 3684-3758, 4042-4178 Fiat 410 A Pistoiesi (demolished)
- 3759-3899, 4001-4041 Fiat 410 A Cameri (demolished)
- 3901-3958 Fiat 412 Aerfer Bipiano
  - 3902 sold to AMA Roma in 1982
  - others were sent to Irpinia as aids for the 1980 Irpinia earthquake
  - another bus is currently preserved in a park with the hope of being converted into a bar
  - the rest were demolished
- 4200-4339, 4480–4599, 4800-4864 Fiat 418 AL Cameri
  - no. 4248, 4266 and 4290 were exported to Cuba
  - the rest were demolished
- 4340-4432, 4750-4789 Fiat 418 AL Portesi
  - no. 4344, 4366, 4369, 4378, 4394 and 4405 were exported to Cuba
  - the rest were demolished
- 4600-4719 Fiat 418 AL Breda (demolished)
- 5000-5219 Fiat 421 A Cameri
  - no. 5044, 5052, 5063, 5091, 5097, 5116 and 5123 were sold to CAT Tivoli in 1992
  - the rest were demolished
- 5220-5319 Fiat 421 A Menarini
  - no. 5220 to 5264 were exported to Cuba
  - the rest were demolished
- 6000-6119 Fiat 421 AL Cameri
  - no. 6008, 6033
