= Anagnina (Rome Metro) =

Rome metro station

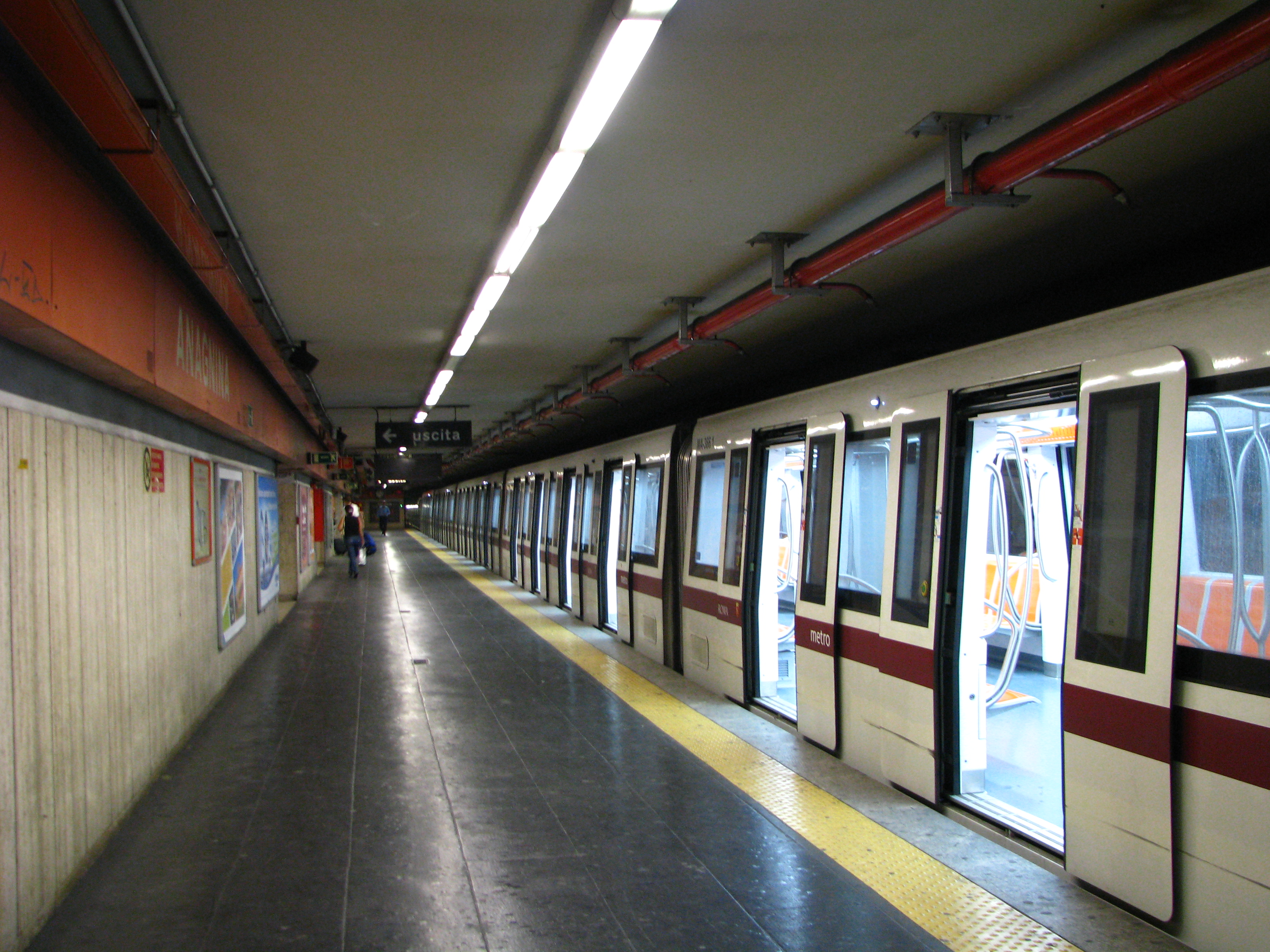

General information
- Location: Rome (Italy), Via Tuscolana
- Coordinates: 41°50′34″N 12°35′10″E
- Owner: ATAC
- Tracks: 2

Construction
- Structure type: Underground station with 2 single-tube tracks
- Parking: 2,000 places

History
- Opened: 1980; 46 years ago

Services
Preceding station	Rome Metro	Following station
Cinecittà towards Battistini	Line A	Terminus
Location
- Click on the map to see marker

Anagnina is a station of Line A of the Rome Metro. It is located at the junction between Via Tuscolana and Via Anagnina, close to the depot of Osteria del Curato. The station is at an altitude of 53 metres (174 ft) above sea level.

== History ==
The Anagnina station was built as the south-eastern terminus of the first section of metro Line A, which came into service on 16 February 1980.

== Description ==
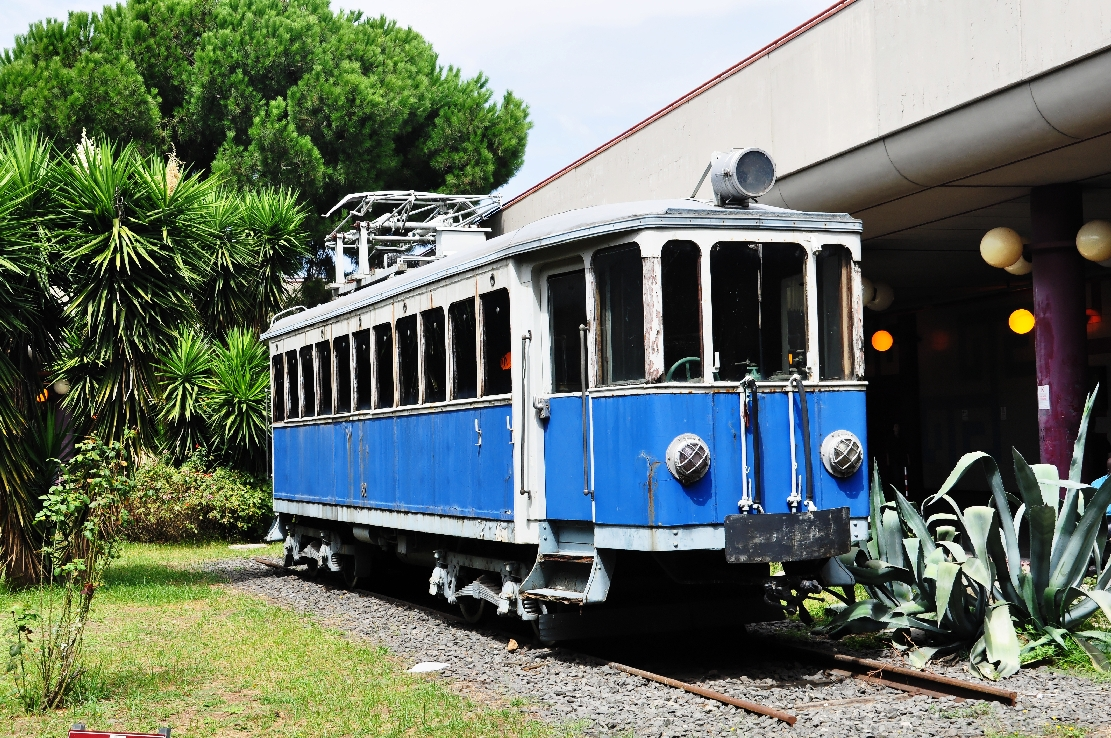
The STEFER locomotive nr. 82

Anagnina is an underground terminal station with two tracks served by two platforms not directly connected to each other. On the floor above that of the platforms there are the ticket offices and a police cage watching the entrance to the station area.

Inside the station, the electric locomotive nr. 82 – which belonged to the former railway company of Rome (STEFER) and served on the Tranvie dei Castelli Romani network – is now preserved as a monument.
The station hall also contains some mosaics created for the Artemetro Roma Prize: the authors are the Italian Luigi Veronesi and Lucio Del Pezzo, the Swiss Gottfried Honegger and the Russian Mikhail Koulakov. The mosaics are said to be a success in that they brighten up otherwise sombre spaces.

== Located nearby ==
- Osteria del Curato
- Grande Raccordo Anulare
- Cinecittà
- La Romanina
- University of Rome Tor Vergata
- Ciampino
- Cinecittà Est

== Services ==
The station is equipped with a video surveillance system and two exchange parking lots.
It is one of the main transport interchanges with urban and suburban bus lines, managed by ATAC and Cotral, respectively; there is also a shuttle that offers a direct connection with the Rome-Ciampino Airport.

- Four parking lots, with a total of almost 2,000 places.
- Ticket office
- Ticket machine
- Bar
- Shops
- Shuttle to Rome Ciampino Airport
- Terminus for regional buses (COTRAL)
- Urban buses: 20 Express - 20L Express - 046 - 047 - 500 - 502 - 503 - 504 - 505 - 506 - 507 - 509 - 515 - 533 - 551 - 556 - 559 - NmA - n551

== Bibliography ==
- Vittorio Formigari; Piero Muscolino (1983). La metropolitana a Roma: notizie dalle origini e ricordi degli autori. Calosci.
