= Municipio VII =

Municipio VII di Roma
- Municipio of Rome
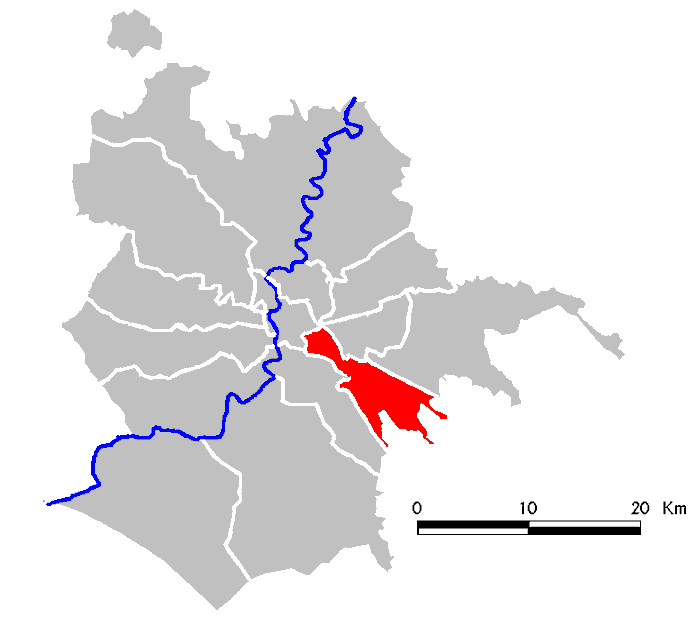
- Location of Municipio VII of Rome
- Country: Italy
- Region: Lazio
- Comune: Rome
- Established: 11 March 2013

Government
  - President: Francesco Laddaga (PD)

Area
  - Total: 45.84 km^{2} (17.70 sq mi)

Population (2019)
  - Total: 318,384
  - Density: 6,945.55/km^{2} (17,988.9/sq mi)
- Time zone: UTC+1 (CET)
  - Summer (DST): UTC+2 (CEST)
- Website: Municipio VII of Rome

Municipio VII is one of the 15 administrative subdivisions of the city of Rome, Italy.

It was first created by Rome's City Council on 11 March 2013 and features a president who is elected during the mayoral elections. The municipio was created through the unification of Municipio IX and Municipio X and it is nowadays the most populous in the city, and the only one with more than 300,000 inhabitants.

In January 2021, the urban zone of Torrespaccata was transferred from Municipio VI to Municipio VII.

== Subdivision ==
Municipio VII is divided into 17 urban zones:

Urban zone	Population
8A. Torrespaccata	13,381
9A. Tuscolano North	21,579
9B. Tuscolano South	47,772
9C. Tor Fiscale	2,250
9D. Appio	27,377
9E. Latino	22,641
10A. Don Bosco	50,684
10B. Appio Claudio	29,167
10C. Quarto Miglio	10,708
10D. Pignatelli	6,602
10E. Lucrezia Romana	5,272
10F. Osteria del Curato	19,303
10G. Romanina	7,224
10H. Gregna	7,085
10I. Barcaccia	11,146
10L. Morena	32,024
10X. Ciampino Airport	412
Not localized	3,757
Total	318,384

== Municipal government ==
The area has its own local authority called Consiglio di Municipio (Municipal Council), composed by a president and 25 members directly elected by citizens every five years. The council is responsible for most local services, such as schools, social services, waste collection, roads, parks, libraries and local commerce in the area, and manages funds (if any) provided by the city government for specific purposes, such as those intended to guarantee the right to education for poorer families.

The current president is Francesco Laddaga (PD). He was elected in the 2021 Rome municipal election together with the 25-member Municipal Council, whose composition is shown below:

Alliance or political party	Members	
Alliance or political party	2021–2027	
Centre-left (PD-SI)	16	16 / 25
Centre-right (Lega-FdI)	5	5 / 25
Five Star Movement (M5S)	2	2 / 25
Action (A)	2	2 / 25

Here is a list of presidents of the Municipio VII since 2013:

President	Party	Coalition	Term of office	
Susana Ana Maria Fantino	SEL	Centre-left	12 June 2013	20 June 2016
Monica Lozzi	M5S		20 June 2016	21 October 2021
Francesco Laddaga	PD	Centre-left	21 October 2021	Incumbent

== Geography ==
The territory of the municipio extends across the south-eastern quadrant of the city, stretching from Porta San Giovanni to the borders of Rome's municipal territory, along the axes of Via Appia Nuova and Via Tuscolana. Covering an area of approximately 45.84 square kilometres (17.70 sq mi), it is the most populous administrative district in Rome.

Its borders are defined as follows:

- To the north-west: the Aurelian Walls
- To the north: the Rome–Cassino–Naples railway, the former Centocelle Airport, and the Autostrada A1
- To the east: the municipalities of Grottaferrata and Frascati
- To the south: Via Appia Nuova and the municipality of Ciampino
- To the west: the Appian Way Regional Park

The geography of Municipio VII is characterized by a stark contrast between highly dense urbanized corridors and vast historical green spaces. The northern and central sections of the district are heavily built-up, developed historically around the major transit thoroughfares of Via Tuscolana and Via Appia Nuova.

In contrast, the southern and western fringes slope gently upward toward the volcanic hillsides of the Alban Hills (Colli Albani). This landscape preserves vital components of the original Roman countryside (Campagna Romana), protected within extensive ecological networks like the Appian Way Regional Park and the Park of the Aqueducts (Parco degli Acquedotti). These green networks serve as crucial environmental corridors that support local biodiversity and mitigate the urban heat island effect across the city's southeastern sector.

== History ==
The territory of the Municipio was inhabited since prehistoric times, as shown by the excavations of the four necropolises of Osteria del Curato-Via Cinquefrondi, Lucrezia Romana, Romanina and Ponte delle Sette Miglia, with rock-out chamber tombs from the Copper Age, related to the so-called Rinaldone culture.

In Roman times, the territory of the Municipio was crossed by the Via Latina and the Via Asinaria.
As in the rest of the Ager Romanus – also thanks to several aqueducts that crossed it – there were numerous villae, that is, farming estates of medium extension whose production was at the service of the city.

In the Middle Ages the villae were converted into Domuscultae and fortifications and later into farmhouses and towers (such as Tor Fiscale, Torre del Quadraro and Torre di Mezzavia), in close relationship with the settlements towards the Roman Castles. The ancient Roman roads were replaced first by Via Tuscolana and then, in 1574, by Via Appia Nuova, opened by Gregory XIII. In place of the broken aqueducts, in 1122 Callixtus II dug the artificial canal of Acqua Mariana, while in 1587 Sixtus V built the Felice aqueduct, which crosses Via Tuscolana near Porta Furba.

Until the beginning of the 20th century the territory boasted many vineyards and villas – most of which were destroyed due to the subsequent building expansion or, in a few surviving cases, whose area was greatly reduced (the present Villa Lais, Villa Fiorelli and Villa Lazzaroni) – as well as production plants and mills exploiting the water power of Acqua Mariana.

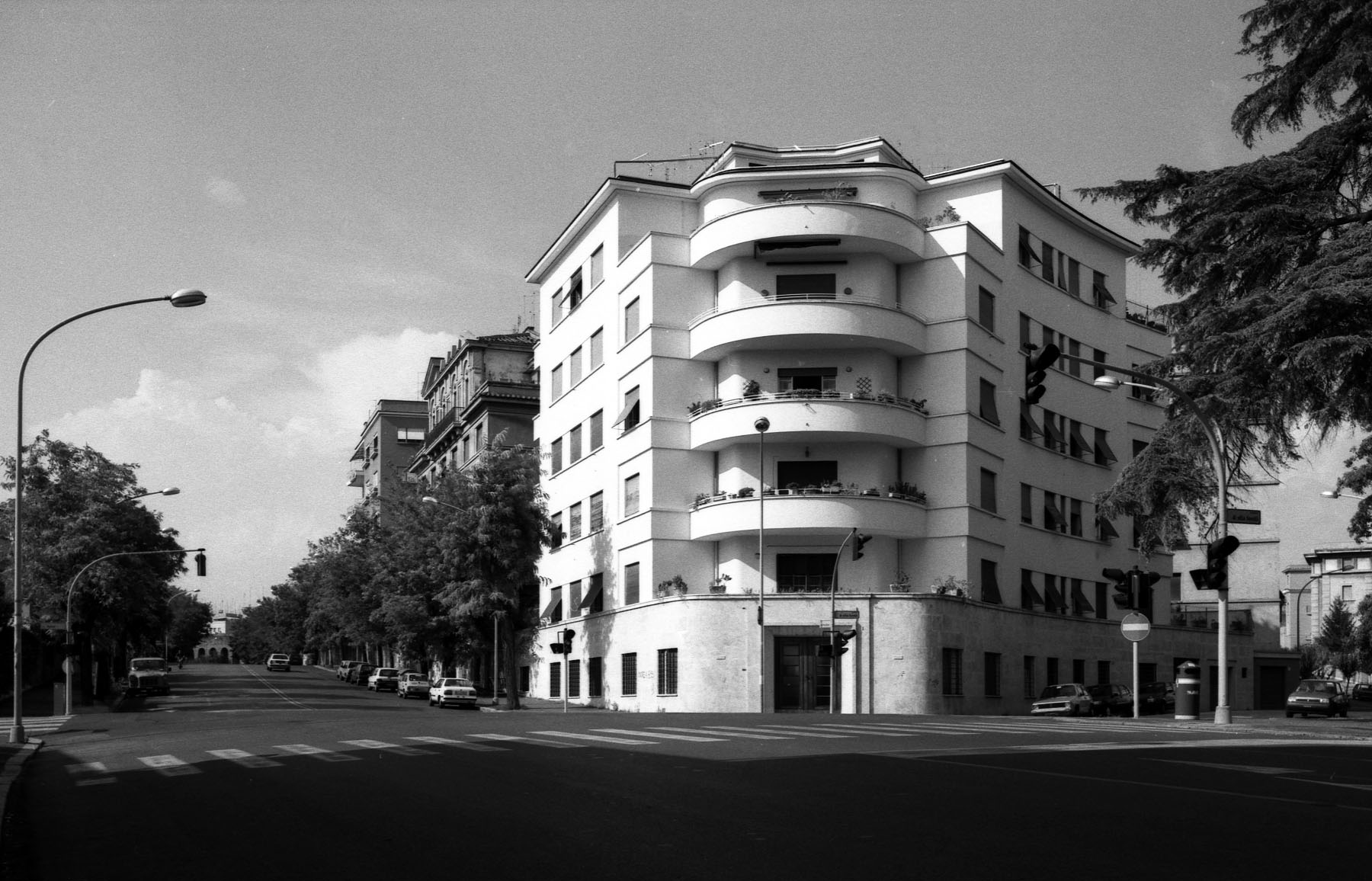
Townhouse near Villa Fiorelli (1995).

The urbanization of the territory began with the master plan of 1909, which declared the areas within the railway to be suitable for small-size buildings and villas, including those that survived around Villa Fiorelli.
A tramway line connecting with the Roman castles was also inaugurated in 1903, the Sound stages of Cines film company in 1905 and the Motovelodromo Appio (later demolished) in 1910.

Both the size of the buildings and the population density, however, increased with the 1925 variant and the new 1931 master plan, resulting in an intensive urban fabric in the Quartieri Appio-Latino and Tuscolano, with tall buildings and very few green areas.
Meanwhile, in breach of the master plan, various unauthorized settlements arose – such as the Quadraro – as well as "hamlets" made of shacks built against the arches (on Via del Mandrione, at the Caffarella and at the Felice aqueduct, restored and demolished only in the late 1970s).

The year 1937 saw the inauguration of the Cinecittà studios (together with the Istituto Luce and the Centro Sperimentale di Cinematografia), where all the greatest directors and actors of Italian cinema shot movies and which became the "Hollywood on the Tiber" in the years of the Dolce Vita, with many famous American productions (the so-called "colossals").

During the Nazi occupation of Rome in World War II, the inhabitants actively participated in the Resistance, to the point that on 17 April 1944 the German army, as a reprisal, carried out a mop-up in the Quadraro, deporting between 700 and 950 men to Germany. On 17 April 2004 the then Municipio X was awarded the Gold Medal for Civil Valor.

After the war, the building expansion continued with the intensive palaces of the Quartieri Don Bosco and Appio Claudio, eventually endangering the Caffarella valley; an exception were the "INA-Casa" buildings between Viale Spartaco and Via Selinunte (on-line, tower and one-family houses with an original urban design, built by the best architects of the "Neorealistic" movement, such as Adalberto Libera).
Moving towards the boundaries of the Municipality, there is a prevalence of both extensive buildings, which have been at least partly built illegally (Quarto Miglio, Statuario, Tor Fiscale, Capannelle, Osteria del Curato, Morena, Gregna, Romanina, Vermicino, Passolombardo), as well as modern districts with greater endowments of public green (Cinecittà Est, Torre di Mezzavia, Nuova Romanina, Nuova Tor Vergata).

The new Roman master plan includes the planning of the urban centrality of Anagnina-Romanina.

== Monuments and places of interest ==
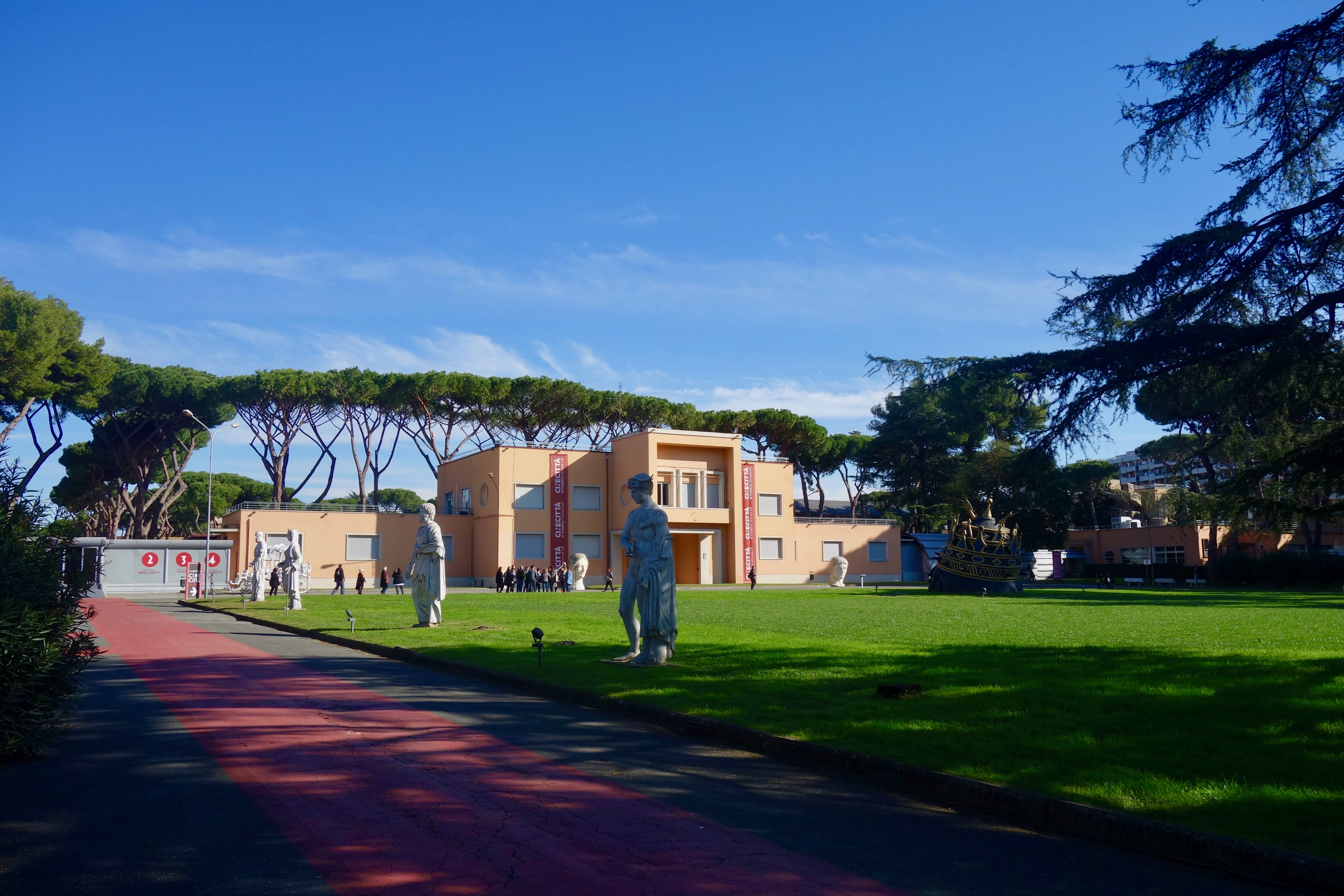
Cinecittà film studios.

- Porta Metronia, Porta Asinaria and Porta San Giovanni in the Aurelian Walls
- Mausoleum of Severus Alexander, also known as Monte del Grano
- Columbaria of Via Pescara and Columbarium of Pomponius Hylas
- Hypogeum of Via Compagni
- Acqua Felice and Porta Furba, built in 1587
- Capannelle Racecourse, inaugurated in 1881 and rebuilt in 1926
- Basilica of Santa Maria Ausiliatrice, consecrated in 1936
- Former seat of Istituto Luce, built in 1937 in Piazza di Cinecittà and currently seat of the Municipality
- Cinecittà film studios, inaugurated in 1937 and linked to the name of Federico Fellini
- Centro Sperimentale di Cinematografia, whose present seat was inaugurated in 1937
- Basilica of San Giovanni Bosco, consecrated in 1959
- Antiquarium di Lucrezia Romana, inaugurated in 2005

=== Parks and villas ===
- Parco degli Acquedotti with seven ancient roman and papal aqueducts: Anio Vetus (underground), Marcia, Tepula, Iulia and Acqua Felice (overlapped), Claudia and Anio novus (overlapped)
- Park of the Caffarella, with the river Almone, part of the Appian Way Regional Park
- Parco XVII Aprile 1944 and Monte del Grano
- Tombs of Via Latina Archaeological Park
- Villa of the sette bassi
- Villa Fiorelli
- Villa Lais
- Villa Lazzaroni

== Libraries ==
- Nelson Mandela, on Via La Spezia
- Raffaello, on Via Tuscolana
- Casa dei Bimbi, on Via Libero Leonardi

== Human geography ==
=== Historic divisions ===
The territory of the Municipio includes the following toponymic districts of the Municipality of Rome.

Quartieri

- Q. VII Prenestino-Labicano (partly), Q. VIII Tuscolano (partly), Q. IX Appio-Latino (partly), Q. XXIV Don Bosco (partly), Q. XXV Appio Claudio, Q. XXVI Appio-Pignatelli (partly)

Zone

- Z. XV Torre Maura (partly), Z. XVI Torrenova (partly), Z. XVII Torre Gaia (partly), Z. XVIII Capannelle, Z. XIX Casal Morena, Z. XX Aeroporto di Ciampino (partly)

=== Administrative divisions ===
The urban division of the territory includes the five urban zones of the former Municipio IX and the eleven ones of the former Municipio X. Its population is distributed as follows:

Municipio Roma VII
9A Tuscolano Nord	22,004
9B Tuscolano Sud	47,904
9C Tor Fiscale	2,190
9D Appio	27,652
9E Latino	23,007
10A Don Bosco	52,600
10B Appio Claudio	29,872
10C Quarto Miglio	11,112
10D Pignatelli	6,737
10E Lucrezia Romana	5,280
10F Osteria del Curato	20,225
10G Romanina	7,449
10H Gregna	7,202
10I Barcaccia	11,175
10L Morena	32,227
10X Ciampino	518
Unaccounted	921
Total	308,075

== Infrastructure and transport ==
=== Streets ===
Road mobility in radial direction is ensured by Via Appia Nuova, Via Tuscolana Via Anagnina, as well as the Rome-Naples motorway, which intersect the Grande Raccordo Anulare.

=== Railways ===
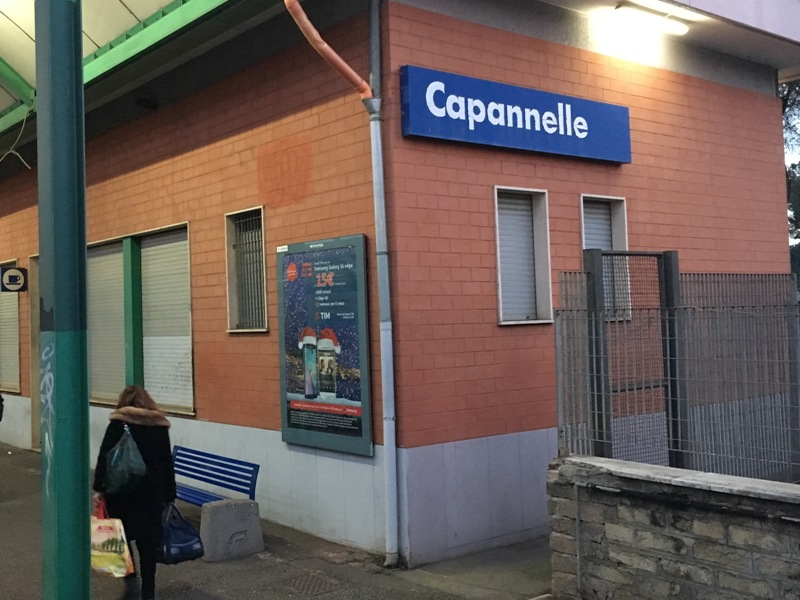
Capannelle station in 2017

It is served by the following stations: San Giovanni, Re di Roma, Ponte Lungo, Furio Camillo, Colli Albani, Arco di Travertino, Porta Furba/Quadraro, Numidio Quadrato, Lucio Sestio, Giulio Agricola, Subaugusta, Cinecittà, Anagnina
It is served by the following stations: San Giovanni, Lodi

Lazio suburban rail. Line 1: Roma Tuscolana, Line 3: Roma Tuscolana, Line 4: Capannelle, Line 5: Roma Tuscolana, Line 6: Capannelle

Almost half of the Line A of the Metro runs inside the Municipio, including the large interchange junction of Anagnina, with the terminus of Cotral suburban bus services along Via Tuscolana, Via Casilina, Via Anagnina, Via Appia and Via Nettunense.

At the Ponte Lungo station it is possible to exchange at the Tuscolana station the FL1, FL3 and FL5 regional railway lines; the other station in the area is that of Capannelle on the FL4 and FL6 lines.

In 2015 the Lodi station of the Line C was inaugurated: it was a temporary terminus until the opening of the San Giovanni station in 2018.

=== Airports ===
- Giovan Battista Pastine International Airport, on the border with the municipality of Ciampino.

== Administration ==
Period		Office holder	Party	Title	Notes
2013	2016	Susana Ana Maria Fantino	Sinistra Ecologia Libertà	President	
2016	Incumbent	Monica Lozzi	Movimento 5 Stelle / Revoluzione Civica	President	

== Twinning ==
The former Municipio IX was twinned with Hai, Hai District, Kilimanjaro Region, Tanzania

== Sport ==
=== basketball ===
- Carver Cinecittà: in the season 2019–2020 plays in the men's Serie C championship.
- Cinecittà BK Polaris: in the season 2019–2020 plays in the men's Serie C championship.

== Bibliography ==
- Riccardo La Bella (2009). 1900–1970: 70 anni di trasformazioni dell'ambiente urbano nel IX Municipio a Roma.
- Sara Fabrizi (2019). La storia del Tuscolano. Dalla preistoria ai giorni nostri. Typimedia.
- Sara Fabrizi (2019). La storia di Appio San Giovanni. Dalla preistoria ai giorni nostri. Typimedia.
