= Quarto Miglio =

Coordinates: 41°50′34″N 12°32′48″E

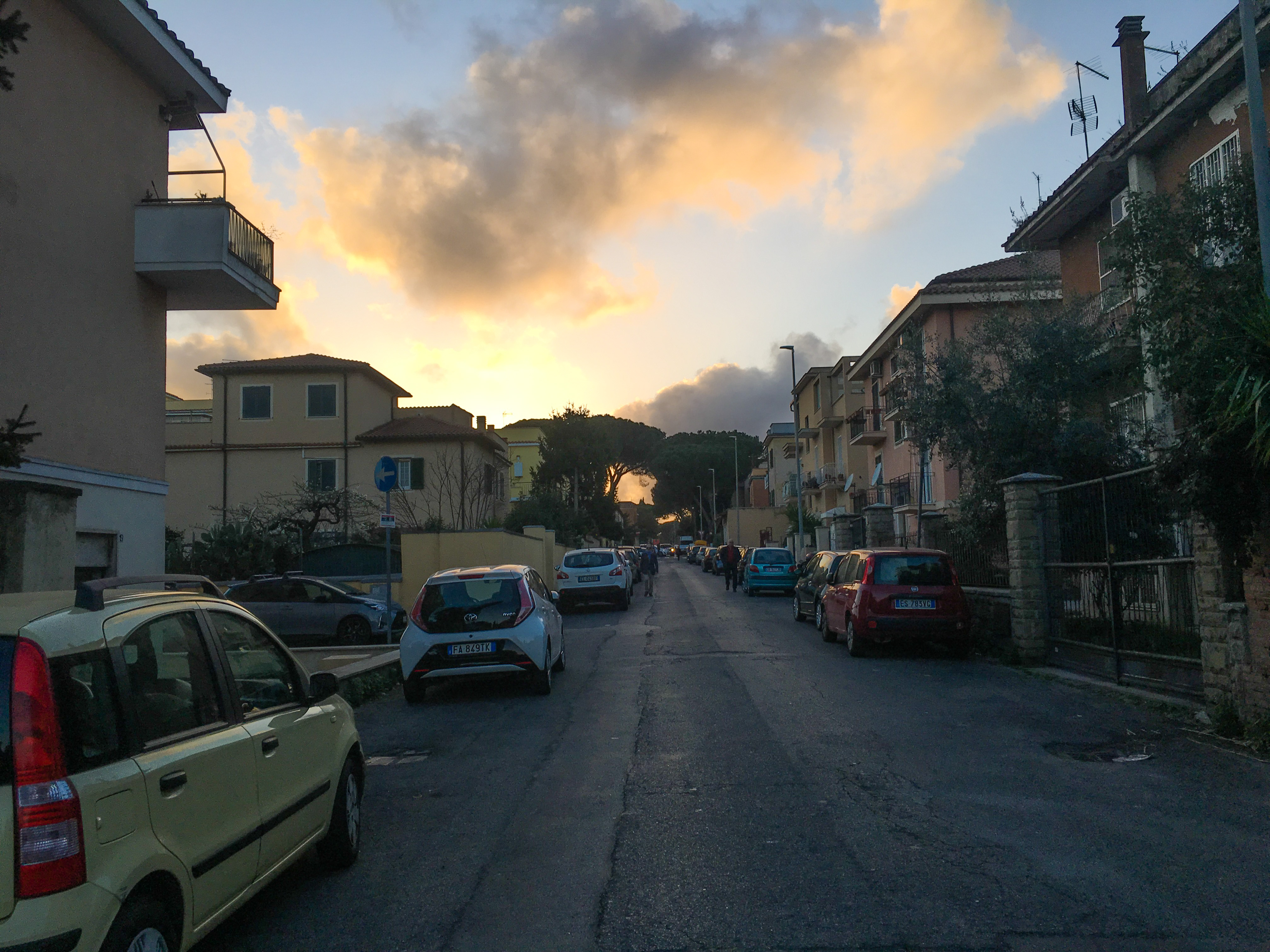
Via di San Tarcisio, Quarto Miglio, March 2019

Quarto Miglio (Fourth Mile) is an urban zone of Municipio VII of Rome, Italy. It was located in the south-eastern area of the city. As of 2010 it had a population of 11,052 people. It takes its name from its proximity to the 4th Mile of the Appian Way, which borders it to the southwest, and is close to much of the Appian Way Regional Park. Many of its street names come from ancient Romans connected with the area, including Herodes Atticus and Annia Regilla. In Roman times the area was known as "ad Quartum".

Construction in the area began in the 1920s but did not really take off until the early 1950s. A parish was established in 1935 and the church of San Tarcisio was completed in 1939. It was visited by Pope John Paul II in 1985 in celebration of Quarto Miglio's 50 years as a parish.

Notable residents have included the film director Franco Zeffirelli, the actress Gina Lollobrigida and the fashion designer Valentino.
