= Catacomb of Saint Castulus =

The Catacomb of Saint Castulus (Italian - catacomba di San Castulo ) is one of the catacombs of Rome, the first cemetery beyond Porta Maggiore along the ancient via Labicana (now via Casilina). It is sited on via San Castulo near the old via Casilina, in the Tuscolano quarter. It is now in a poor condition and inaccessible.

It was rediscovered in 1685 by Raffaele Fabretti, who linked it to the catacomb mentioned in the legendary 'passio' of the martyr Castulus and the 'De locis sanctis martyrum quae sunt foris civitatis Romae' (a late 7th century pilgrims' itinerary) thanks to finding fragments of an inscription (now thought to be fakes) reading martyre dominu Castulu. 'De locis' mentions that the same catacomb also contained the grave of a martyred bishop named Stratonice, of whose life nothing is known and who does not appears in any other sources. Both saints' remains were translated by Pope Paschal I (817–824) in the Basilica of Santa Prassede.

The passio and De locis state that the saint was buried in a cemetery "next to the aqueduct", which scholars identify with the Aqua Claudia along the Rome-Naples railway line. Both texts also state it was located 'in arenario' (in sandstone), which also identifies it with the one on via San Castulo since, when it was rediscovered for a second time by Giovanni Battista de Rossi in 1864, he discovered that the cemetery was created out of an abandoned pozzolana quarry.
