= Appian Way Regional Park =

Large archaeological park in Rome, Italy

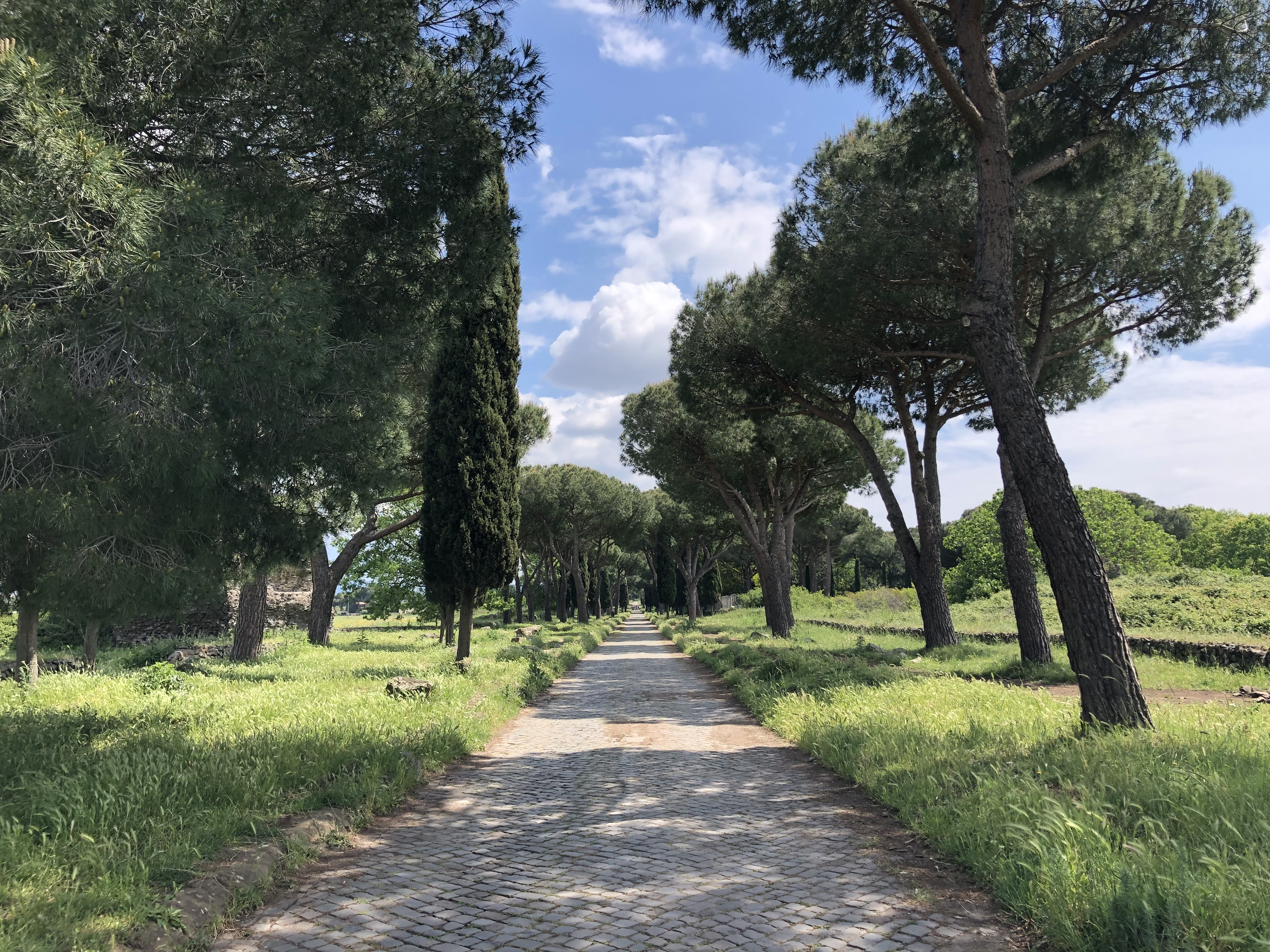
- The Appian Way, Regina Viarum - "Queen of the streets", strategically most important Roman roads of the ancient Republic.
- Click on the map for a fullscreen view
- Type: Urban park and Archaeological site
- Location: Rome, Italy
- Coordinates: 41°50′32.84″N 12°31′42.52″E
- Area: 4,580 ha (11,300 acres)
- Created: 1988
- Status: Open year-round
- Website: parcoappiaantica.it; parcoarcheologicoappiaantica.it

UNESCO World Heritage Site
- Official name: Via Appia. Regina Viarum
- Type: Cultural
- Criteria: iii, iv, vi
- Designated: 2024
- Reference no.: 1708
- Region: Southern Europe

The Appian Way Regional Park in Rome is the second-largest urban park of Europe, after Losiny Ostrov National Park in Russia. It is a protected area of around 4580 hectares, established by the Italian region of Latium. It falls primarily within the territory of Rome but parts also extend into the neighbouring towns of Ciampino and Marino. The peculiarity of the park that distinguishes it, is that it also hosts the Archaeological park of Appia Antica, which coincides with the perimeter of the regional park itself. It is a monumental park which contains precious legacies of ancient Rome, including the Appian Way (for a stretch of 16km/9.94mi), Roman aqueducts, Roman villas, mausoleums, catacombs.

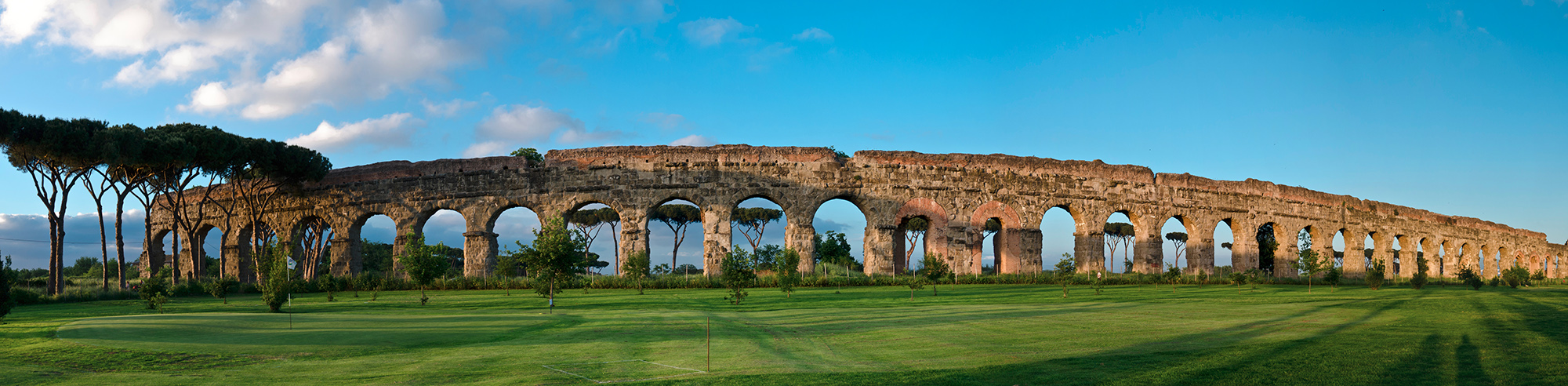
Aqua Claudia in the Parco degli Acquedotti

== The Park ==
The park aims to be a "green wedge" between the centre of Rome and the Alban Hills to the southeast. It contains a majority of the relics of Ancient Rome to be found outside the city centre. It consists of the Appian Way, from the centre of Rome to the 10th Mile, including the Villa of the Quintilii; the Park of the Caffarella; the Tombs of Via Latina archaeological zone; and the Aqueduct Park as well as other areas not accessible to the public.

== History ==
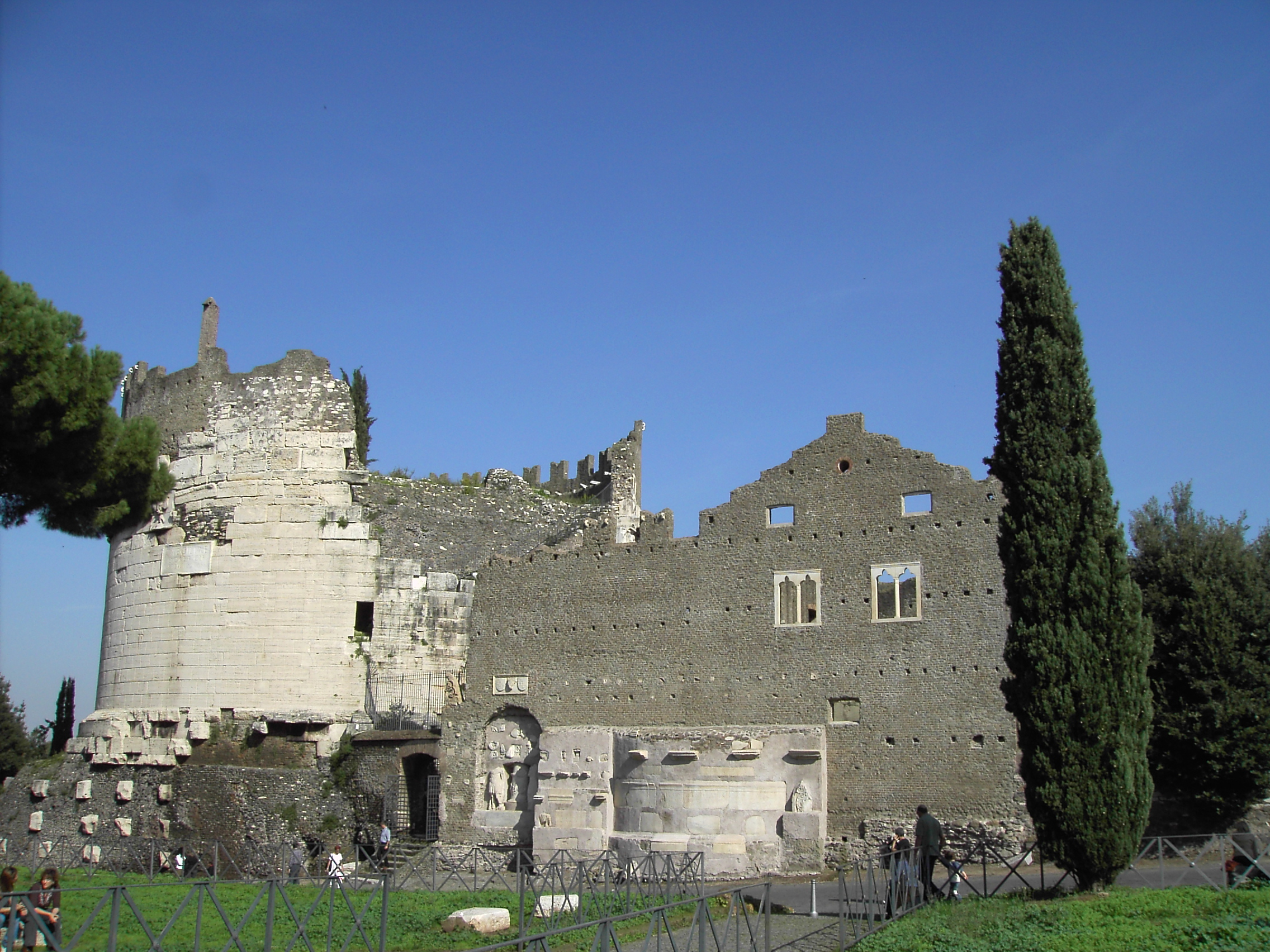
The Tomb of Caecilia Metella. It forms an archaeological continuum with the Castrum Caetani, which rises in Rome, shortly before the third mile of the Ancient Appian Way.

The idea of a great archaeological park between the Roman Forum and the Alban Hills dates back to Napoleonic times. Following initial restoration work on one tomb by Antonio Canova in 1807 and 1808 and subsequent restoration in the area of the Tomb of Caecilia Metella by Giuseppe Valadier, it was Pope Pius IX who took the first major steps to organize the archaeological ruins of the Appian Way, with the assistance of Luigi Canina. After Italian unification further efforts were made to develop an archaeological walk from the city centre to Rome's southeast, but this only reached as far as the Baths of Caracalla.

In 1931, a new plan envisaged the Appian Way to become a great park but this idea was threatened after the Second World War with the construction of illegal villas and sports clubs close to the monuments and other housing that encroached on the edges of the zone. Moreover, the new ring road for Rome, the Grande Raccordo Anulare, cut in two the Appian Way at the seventh mile, a mistake that was only rectified with the construction of a tunnel before the Great Jubilee of 2000. The Park finally became a reality in 1988 and in 2002 it was expanded with the purchase of an area known as the Tor Marancia. The Park remains 95% in private hands: 40% is held by aristocratic Roman families; 25% by companies; 21% by small landowners and 10% by the Catholic Church. Attempts to take more of the land into public possession have been constrained by a lack of funds. There remain ambitious plans to extend the Park all the way into Rome as far as the Roman Forum in one direction, and as far as the Castelli Romani park in the other.

== The Appian Way ==
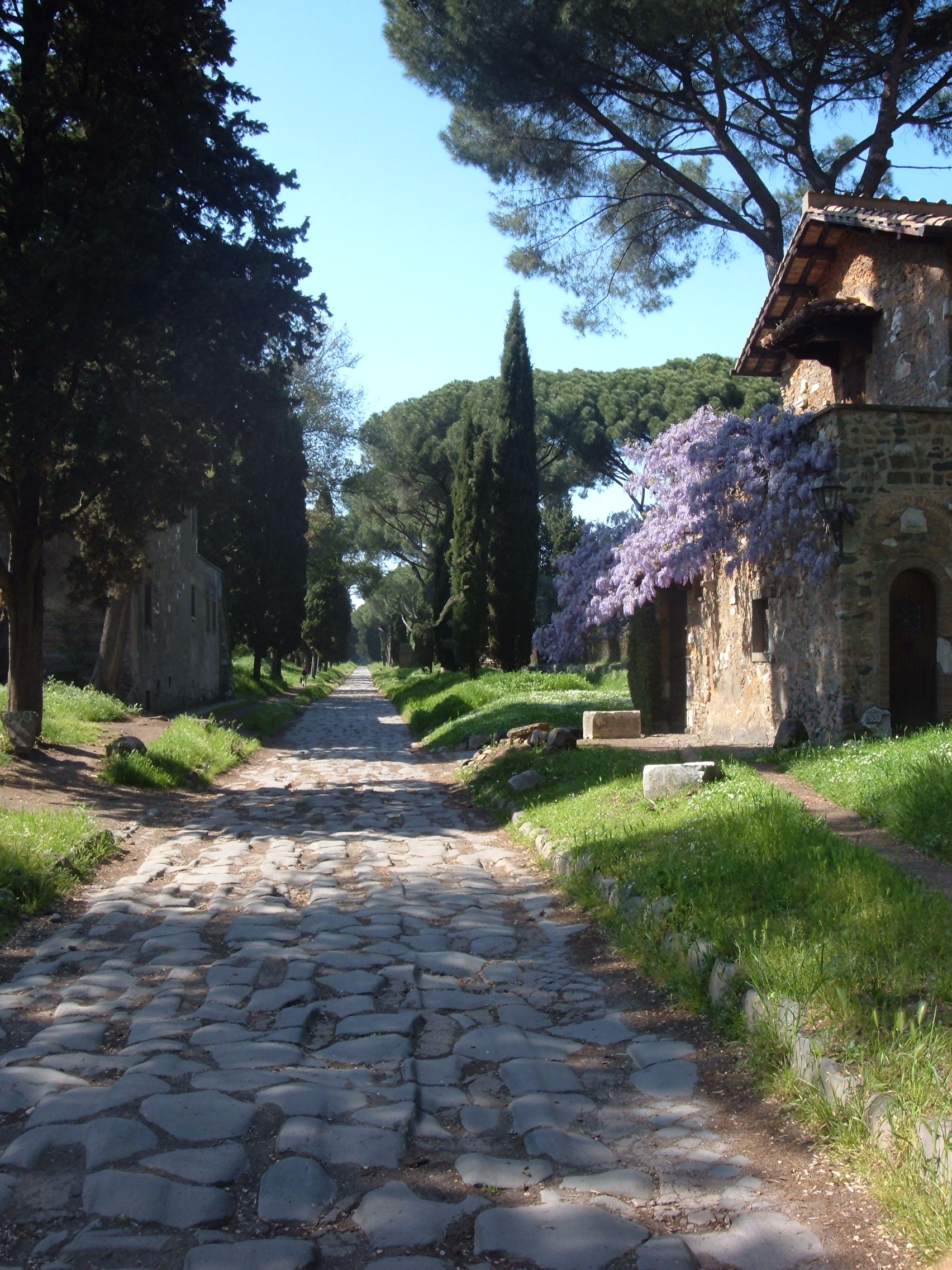
Via Appia Antica 4.1 km southeast from Porta Appia (Porta San Sebastiano), the gate of the Aurelian Walls

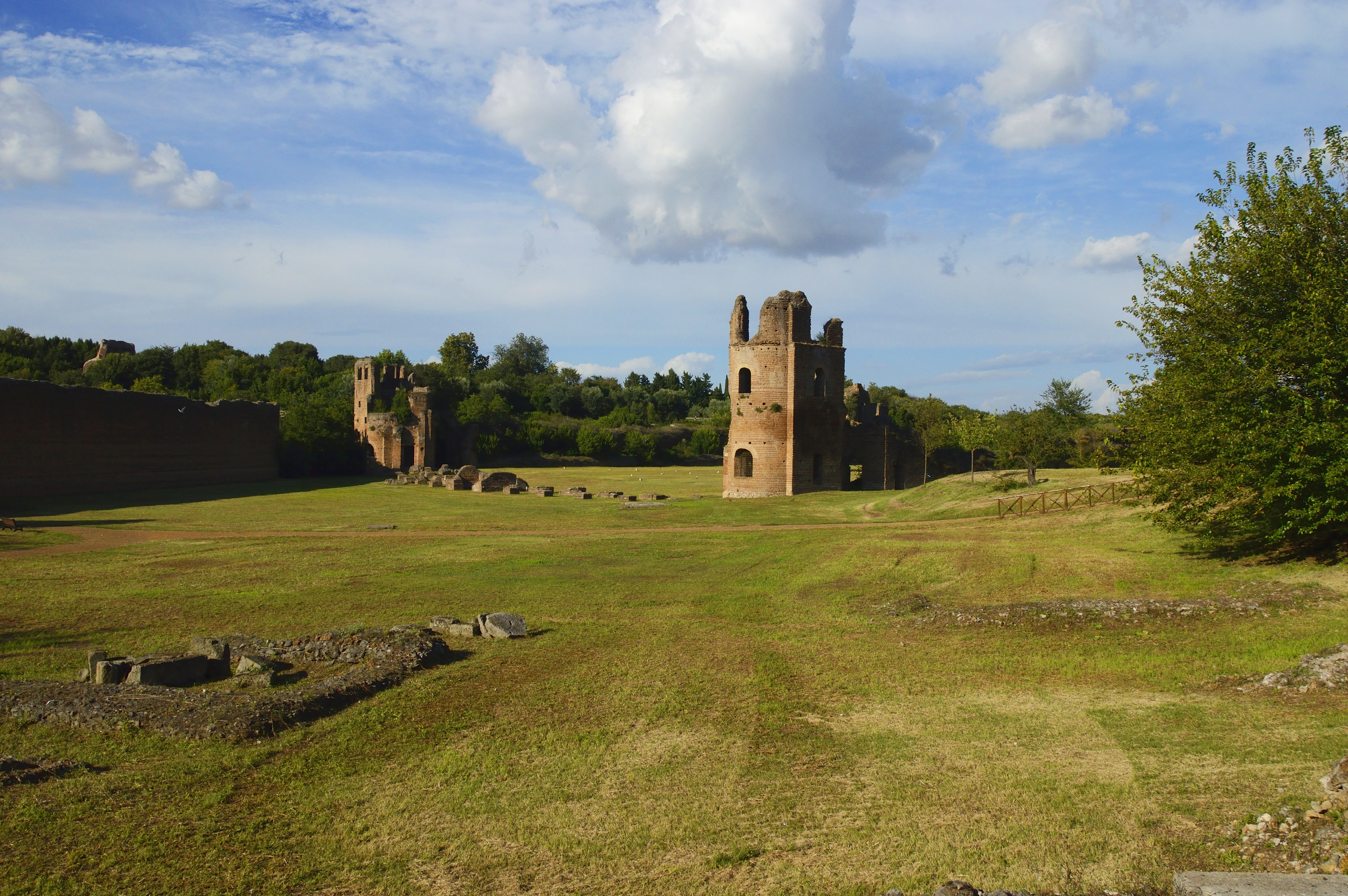
The Circus of Maxentius

The Appian Way (Latin and Italian: Via Appia) was one of the earliest and strategically most important Roman roads of ancient Rome. It connected Rome to Brindisi in southeast Italy. After the fall of the Roman Empire, the road fell out of use. On the orders of Pope Pius VI the road was restored and a new Appian Way was built in 1784 in parallel with the old one, as far as the Alban Hills. The new road is the Via Appia Nuova ("New Appian Way") as opposed to the old section, now known as Via Appia Antica. Mile 1 to Mile 10 falls within the Regional Park. Noted monuments along the route include Porta Appia (Porta San Sebastiano), the gate of the Aurelian Walls, the Tomb of Priscilla, the Christian catacombs of Saint Sebastian, and Callixtus and the Jewish catacomb of Vigna Randanini, the Circus and Mausoleum of Maxentius, the Tomb of Cecilia Metella, the Roman baths of Capo di Bove, the Tomb of Hilarus Fuscus, the Mausoleum of the Orazi and Curiazi and the Mausoleum of Casal Rotondo. In places along this stretch of the road the original surface of volcanic rock is exposed.

== Via Latina Tombs ==
The Tombs of Via Latina are Roman tombs, mainly from the 2nd century AD, that are found along a short stretch of the old Roman road of Via Latina, on the southeast outskirts of Rome, within the Regional Park. They now constitute an archaeological park and can be visited. The tombs were discovered in 1857–58. Excavations supported by Pope Pius IX subsequently uncovered various sepulchers and tombs along a 450m stretch of the old road.

== Caffarella Valley ==
The Caffarella Valley is a large park bordered on its northern side by the Via Latina and on its southern by the Appian Way. It extends lengthways from the Aurelian Wall up to the Via dell'Almone and contains several items of archaeological interest, as well as a working farm, and has considerable ecological value, with 78 species of birds and fauna. In Roman times much of the area was occupied by a large estate known as the Triopius. Herodes Atticus was a Greek who became a Roman senator and through his marriage to Annia Regilla he acquired the land of the estate. Two ruins in the park date from that time, the tomb of Annia Regilla and the Nympheum of Egeria.

== Tor Fiscale Park ==
Six Roman aqueducts made their way into Rome through this small area, which takes its name from a 13th Century watchtower. Over the years the area was a popular encampment for armies seeking to invade Rome as it was on the Via Latina and close to the Appian Way.

== Aqueducts Park ==
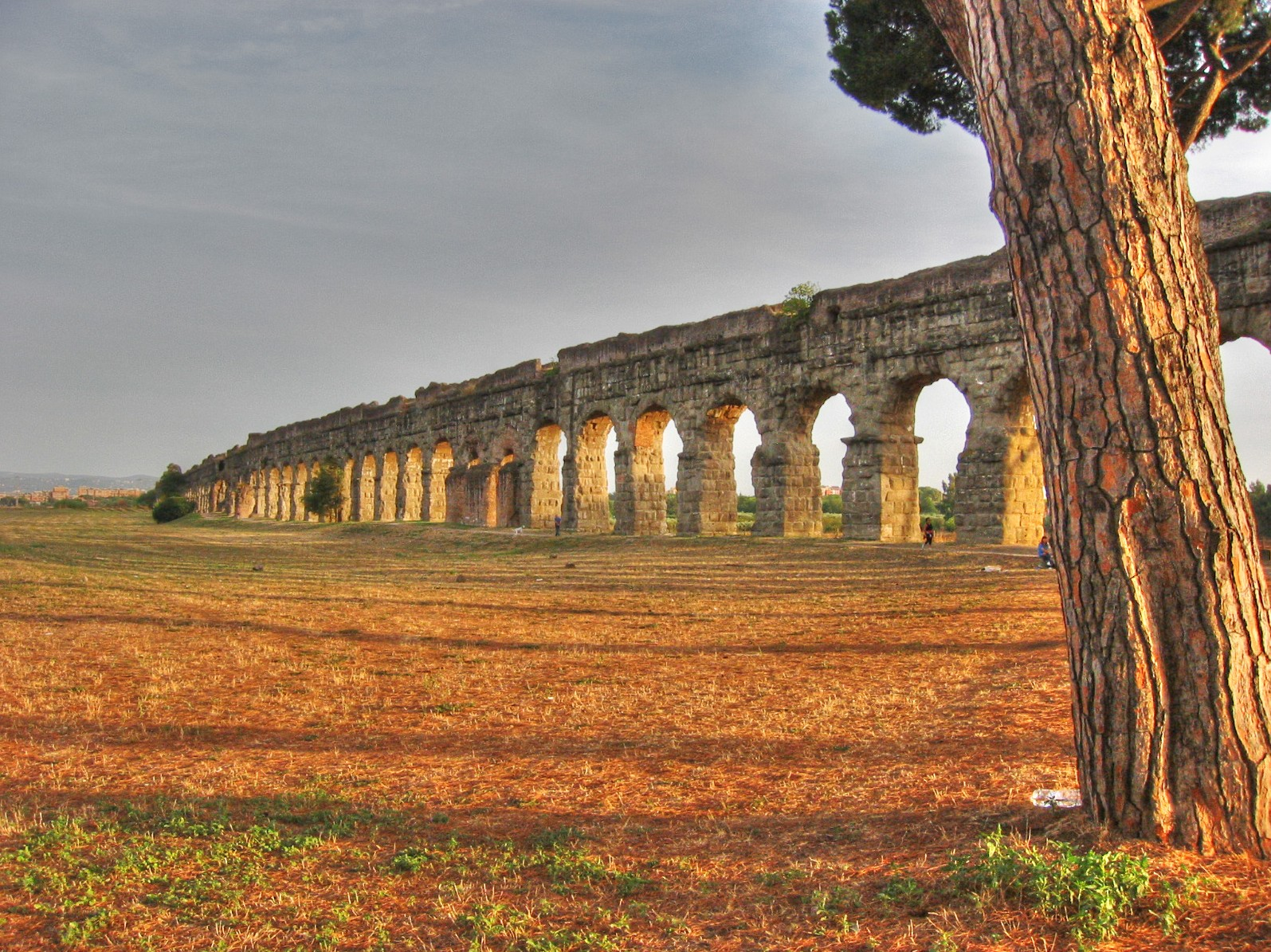
View of the park and a Roman aqueduct

The Parco degli Acquedotti is a public park of approximately 240 ha. The park is named after the aqueducts that dissect it, the Aqua Felix and the Aqua Claudia. It also contains the remains of the Villa delle Vignacce to the North West.

== Villa of the Quintilii ==
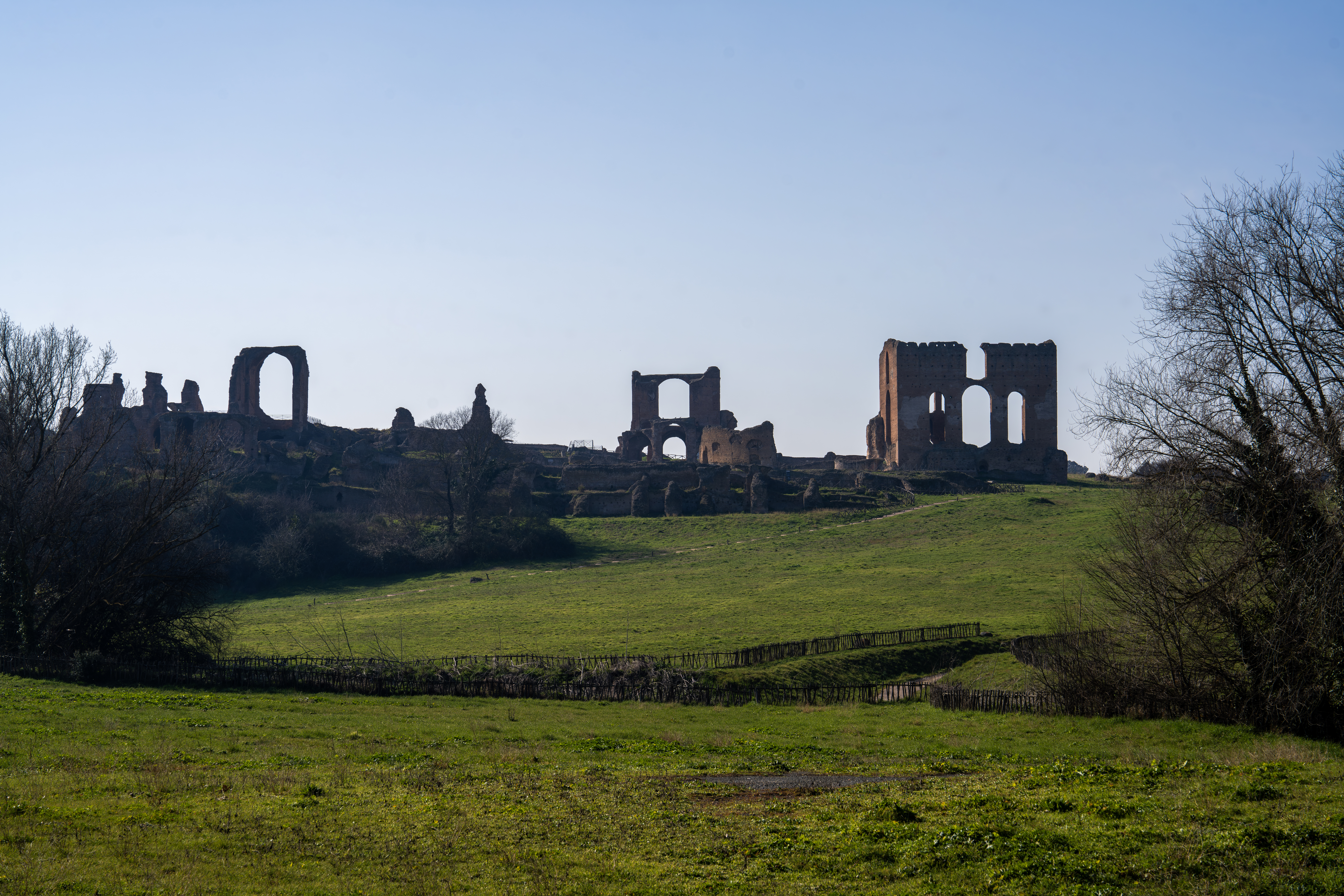
Panoramic view of the Villa

The Villa of the Quintilii (Italian: Villa dei Quintili) is an ancient Roman villa beyond the fifth mile of the Appian Way. It was built by the brothers Sextus Quintilius Maximus and Sextus Quintilius Condianus during the 2nd century. The villa included extensive thermae fed by its own aqueduct, and a hippodrome, dating from the fourth century. The emperor Commodus coveted the villa strongly enough to put to death the brothers in 182 and confiscate it for himself.

== Villa dei Sette Bassi ==
The villa lies to the south of Via Tuscolana. Its name probably derives from Septimius Bassus, prefect under the Emperor Septimius Severus (193 – 211), and is second in size only to the villa of the Quintilii. It was built towards the middle of the second century, close to the fifth mile of the Via Latina, in the time of Emperor Antoninus Pius.

== Tor Marancia ==
Slightly to the west of the main park area, Tor Marancia is an undulating, wooded area containing considerable biodiversity for an area so close to Rome's suburbs.

== See also ==
In addition to sites from ancient Rome, the Regional Park includes, or borders on, many religious sites and other points of interest, including:

- Church of Domine Quo Vadis
- Saint Sebastian outside the Walls
- Church of Sant'Urbano alla Caffarella
- Ardeatine Caves. Site of massacre of Roman citizens by Germans during World War II.
- Catacombs of Domitilla
- Catacomb of Callixtus
- Catacombs of San Sebastiano
- Vigna Randanini Jewish Catacomb

== Photo gallery ==
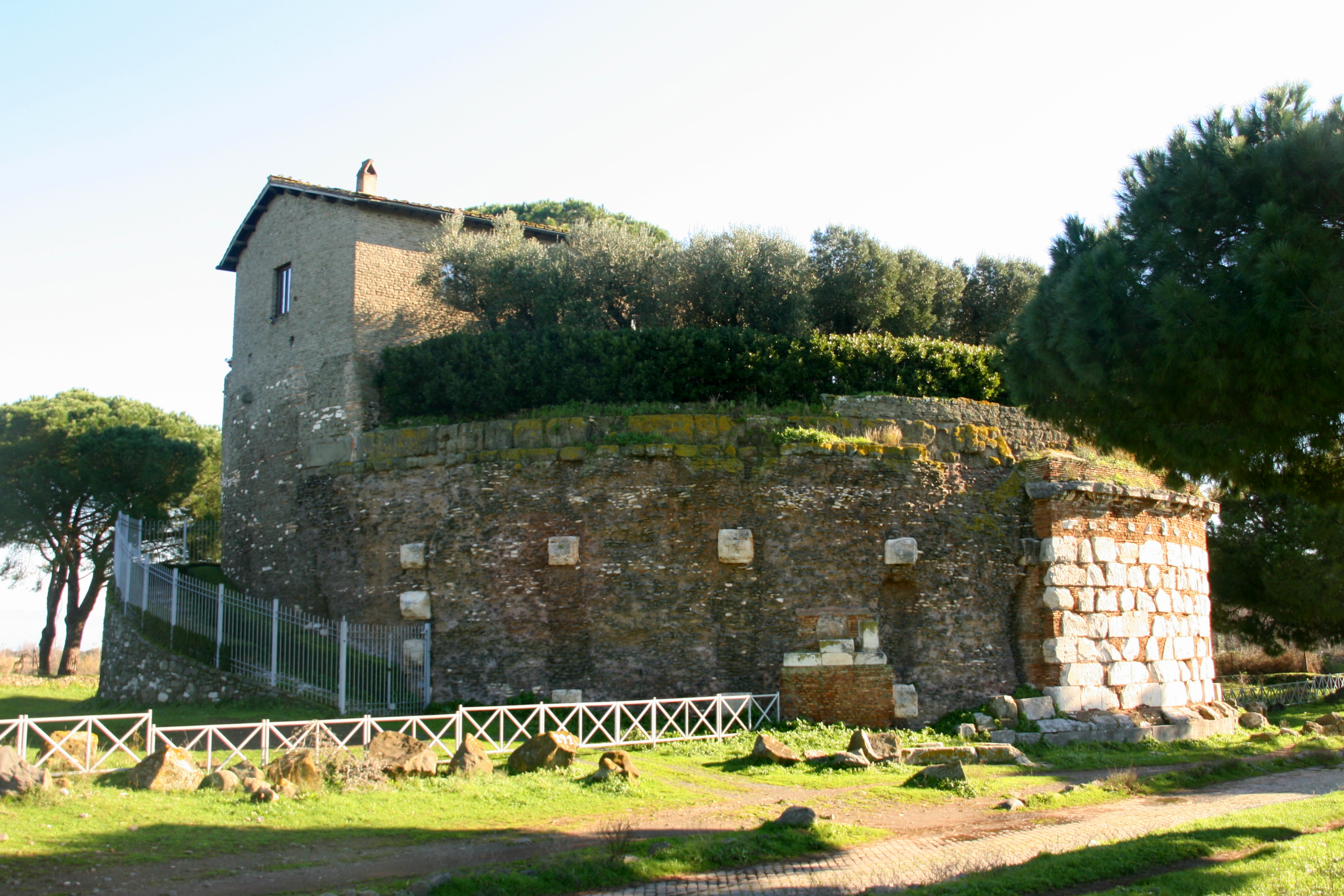

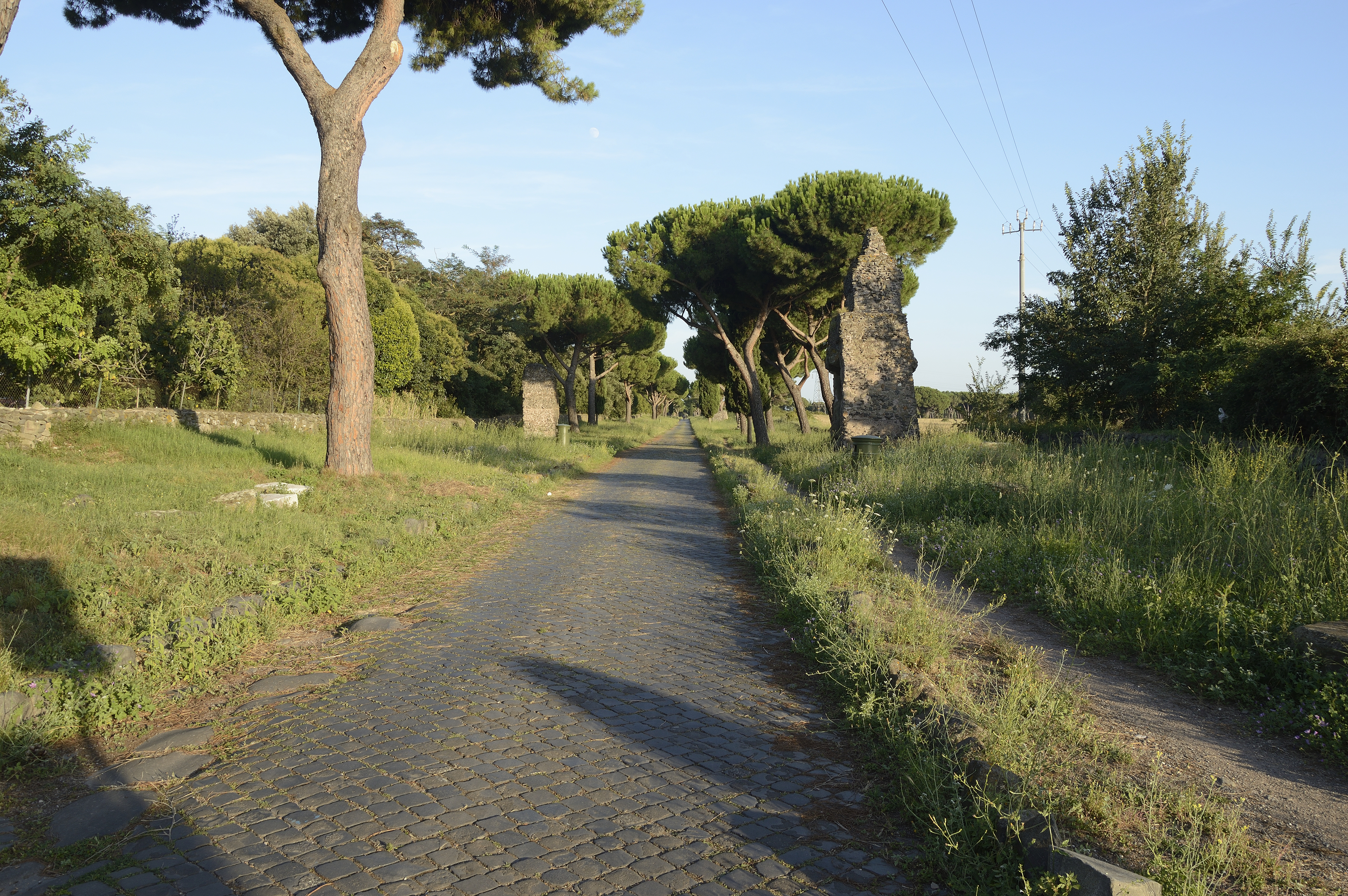

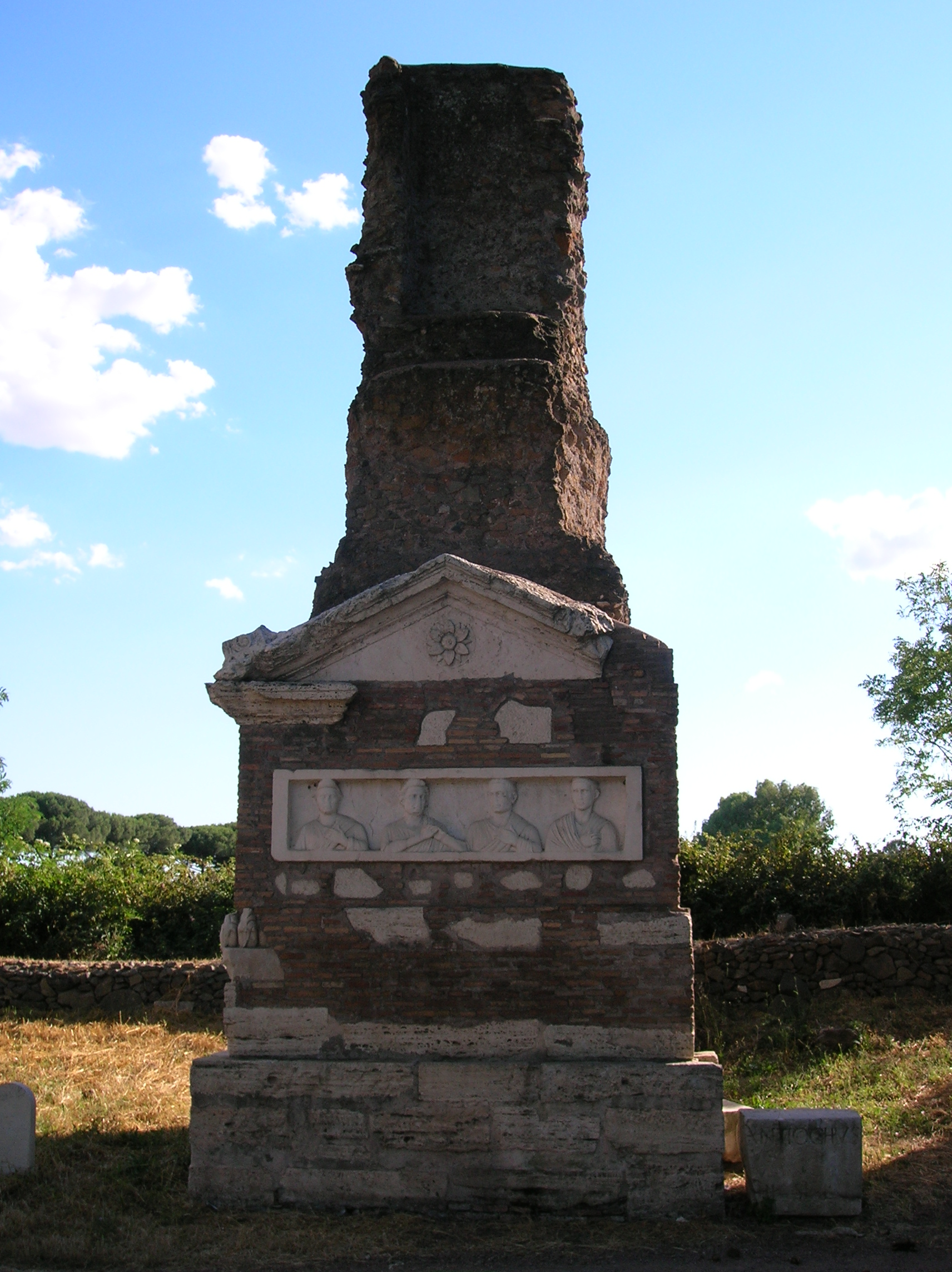

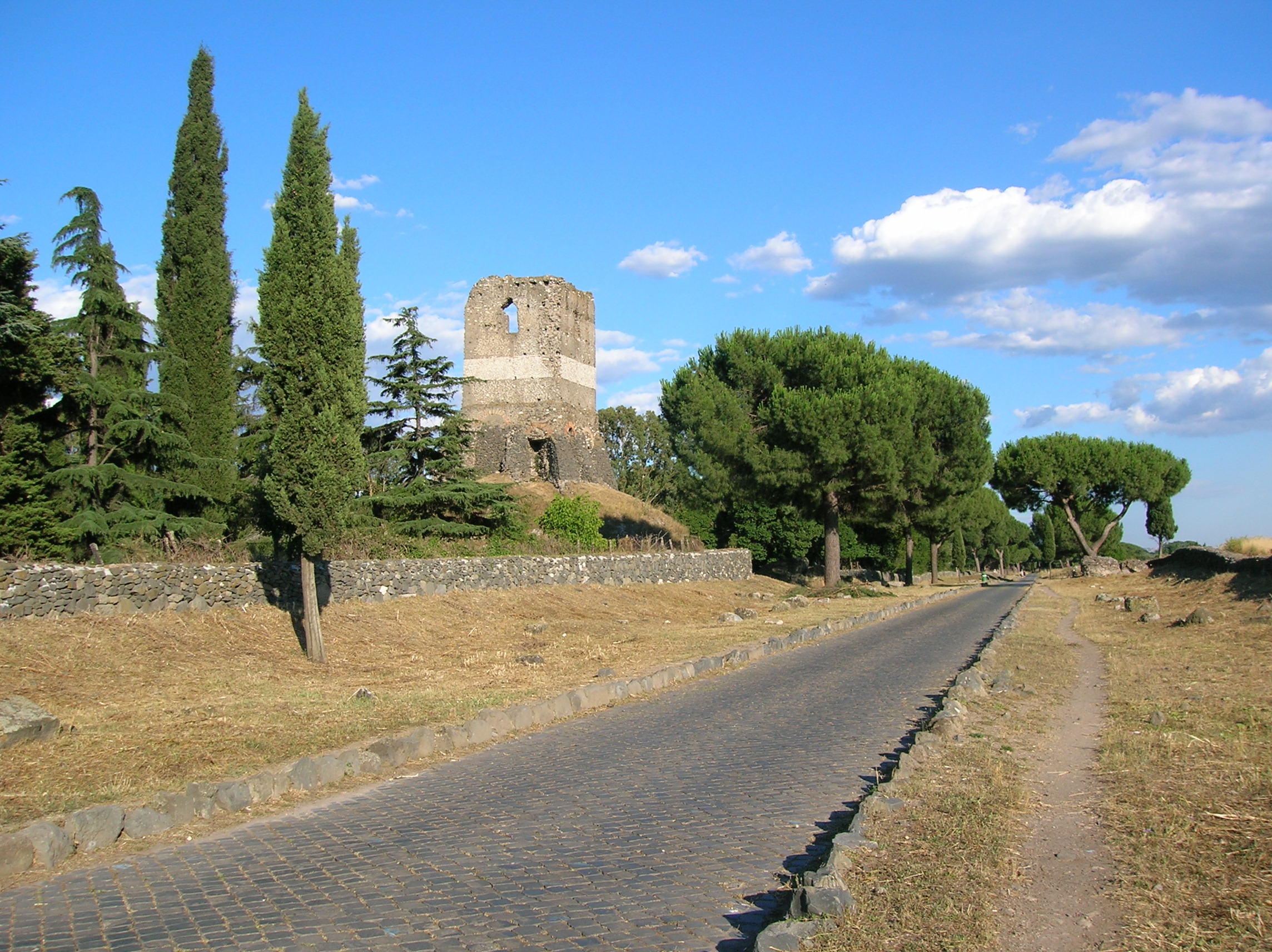

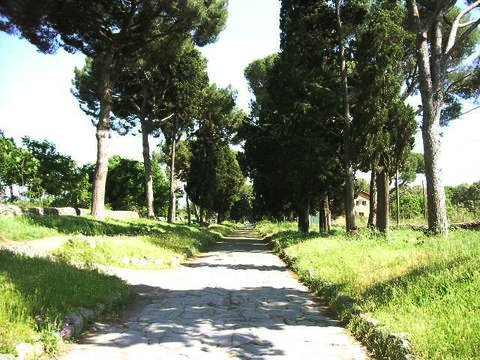

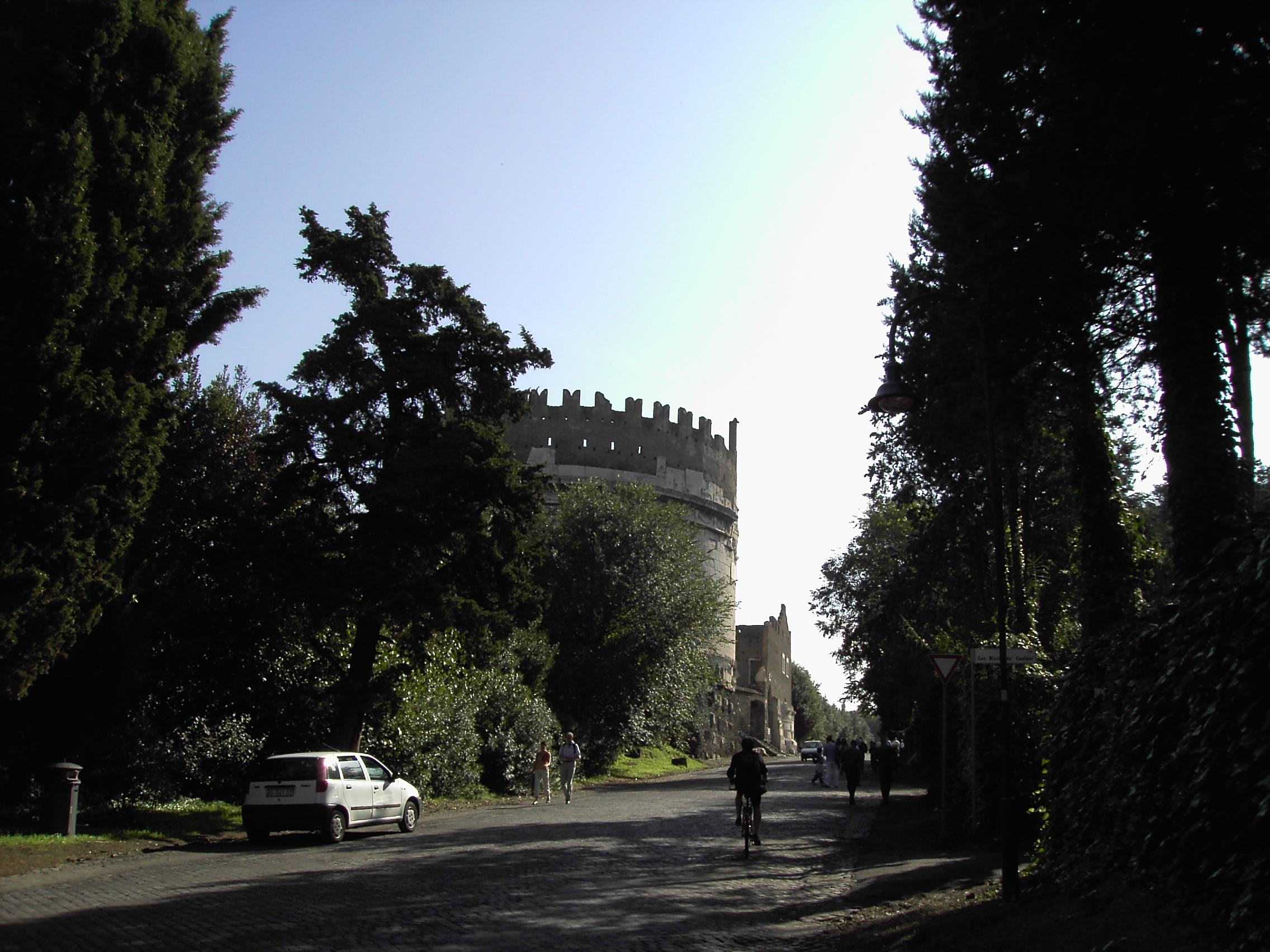

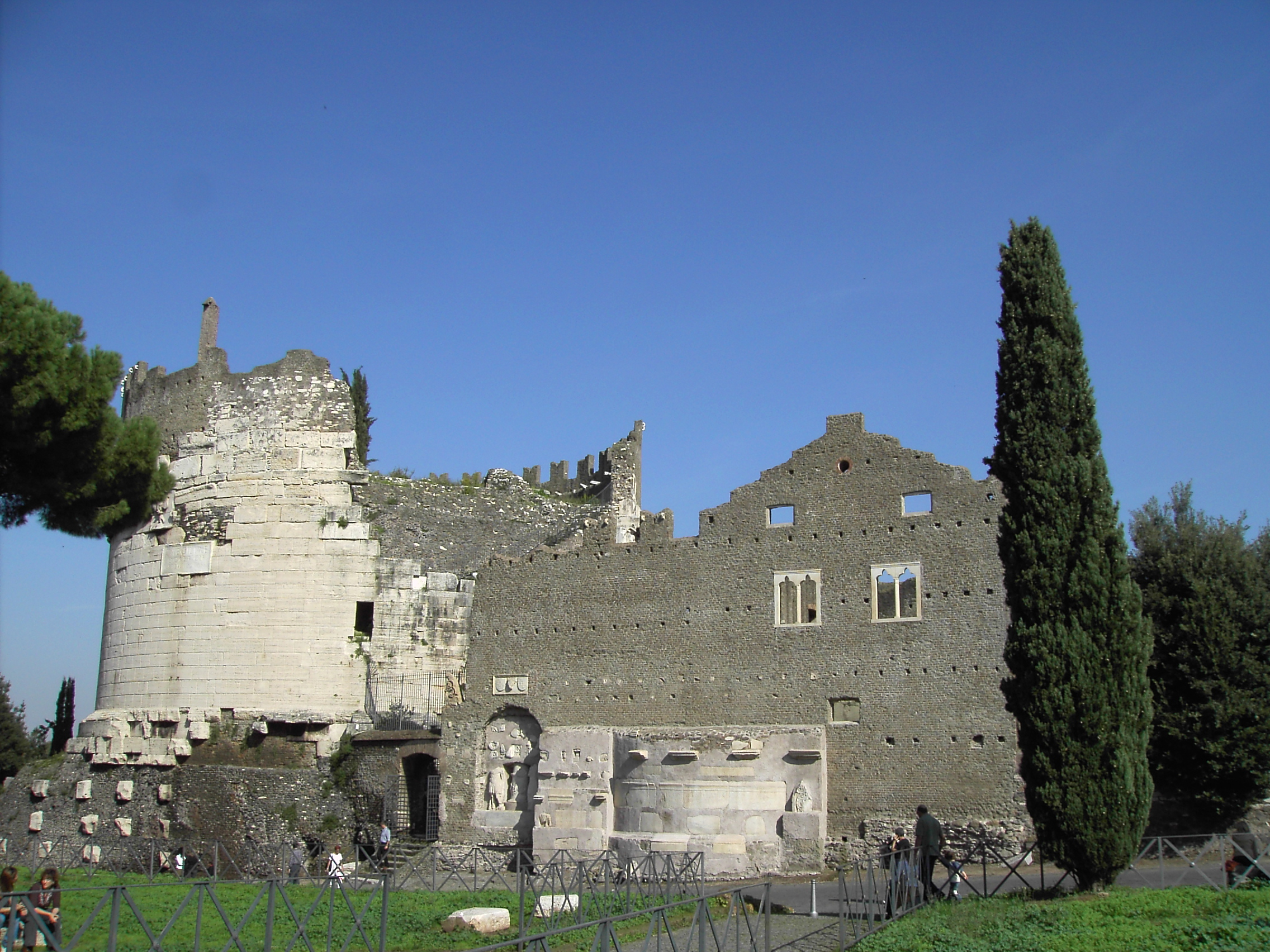

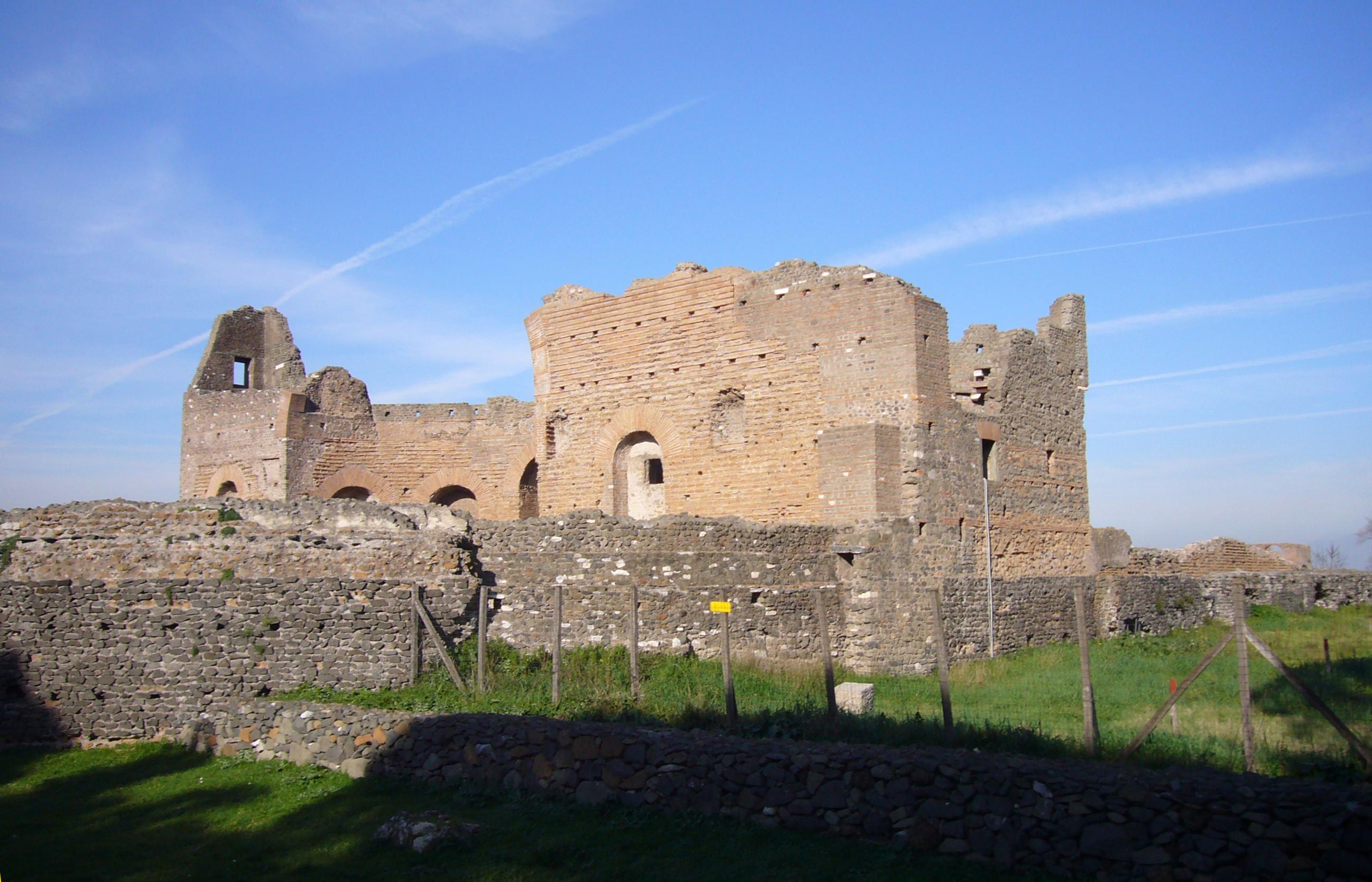

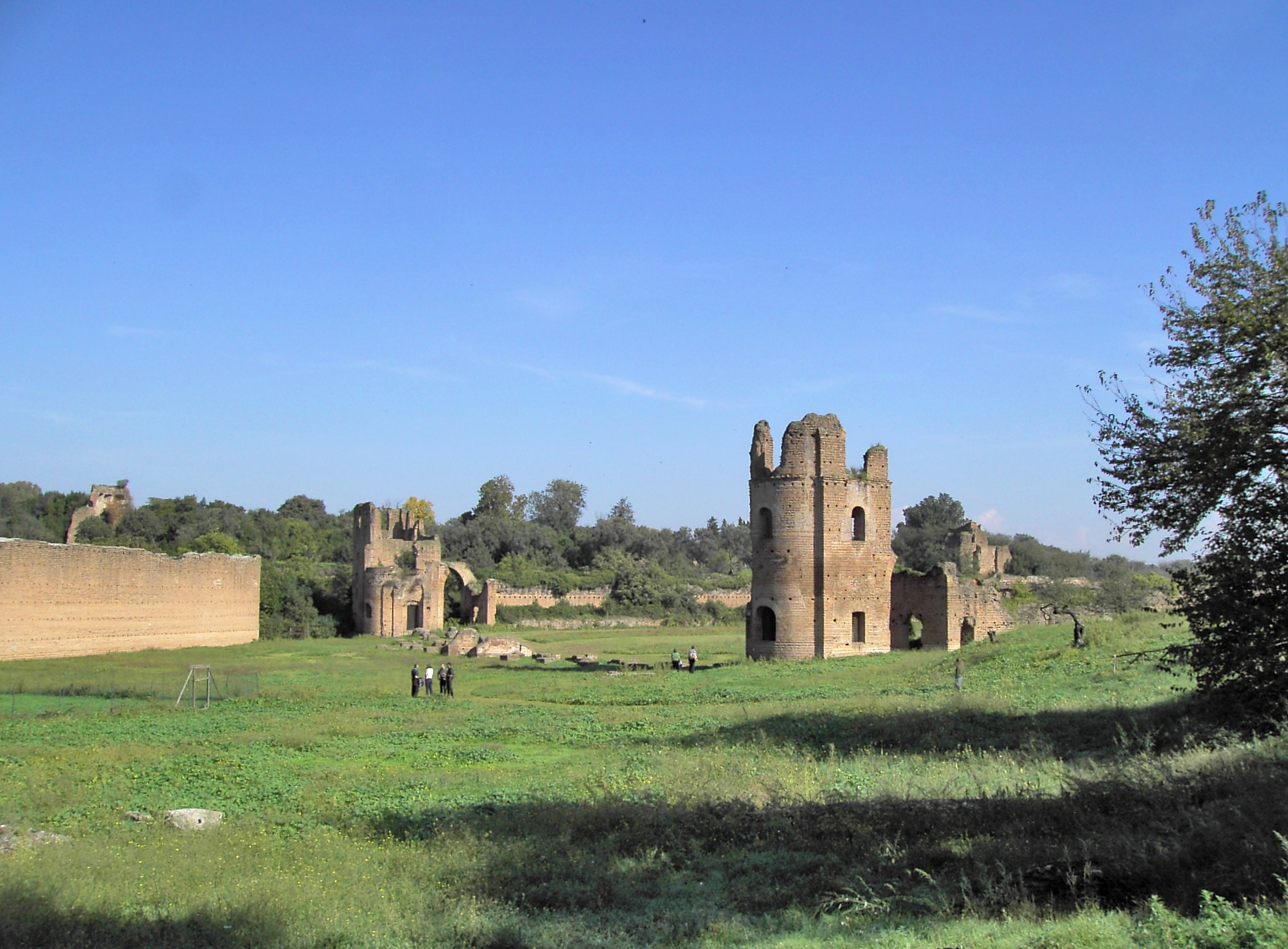

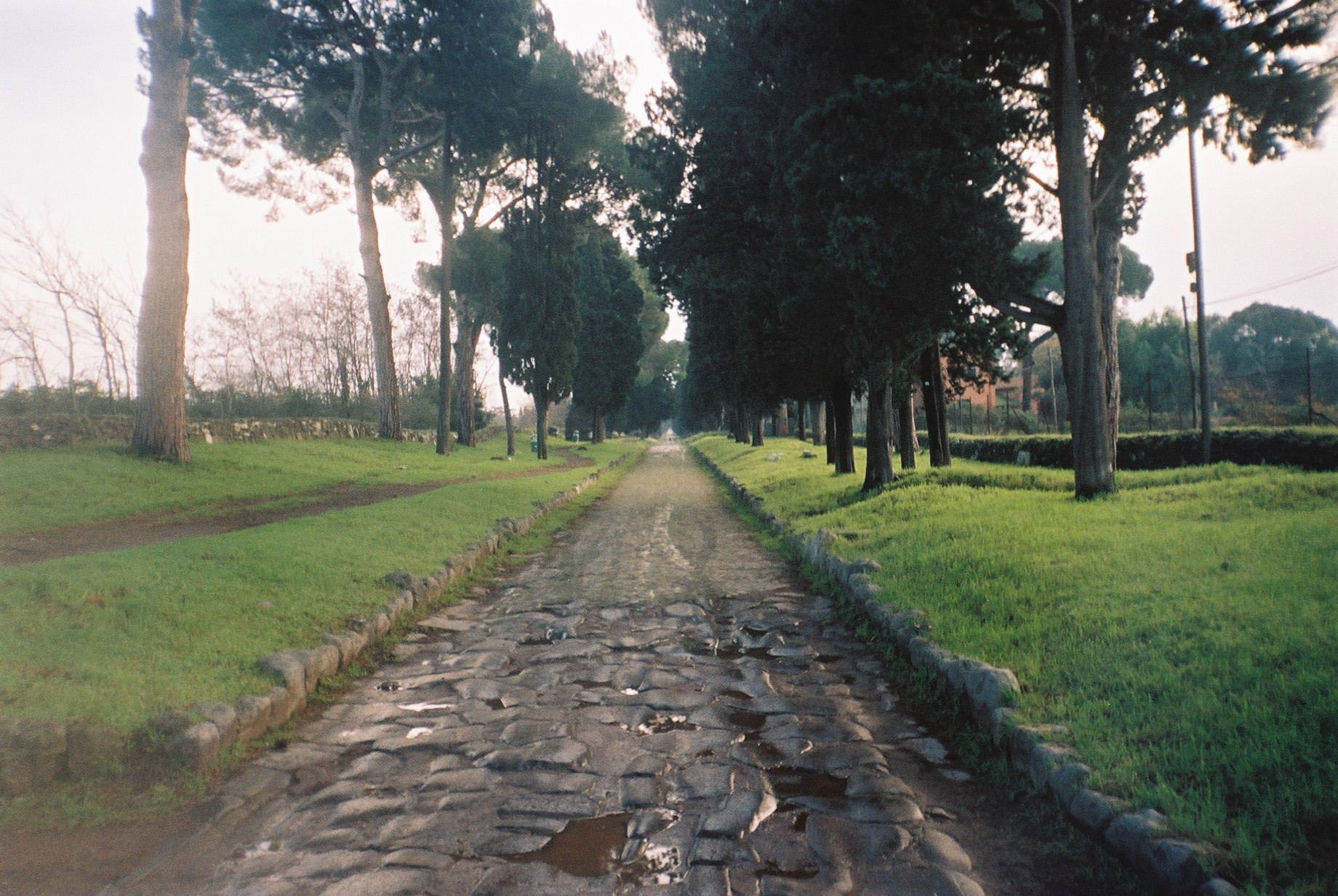

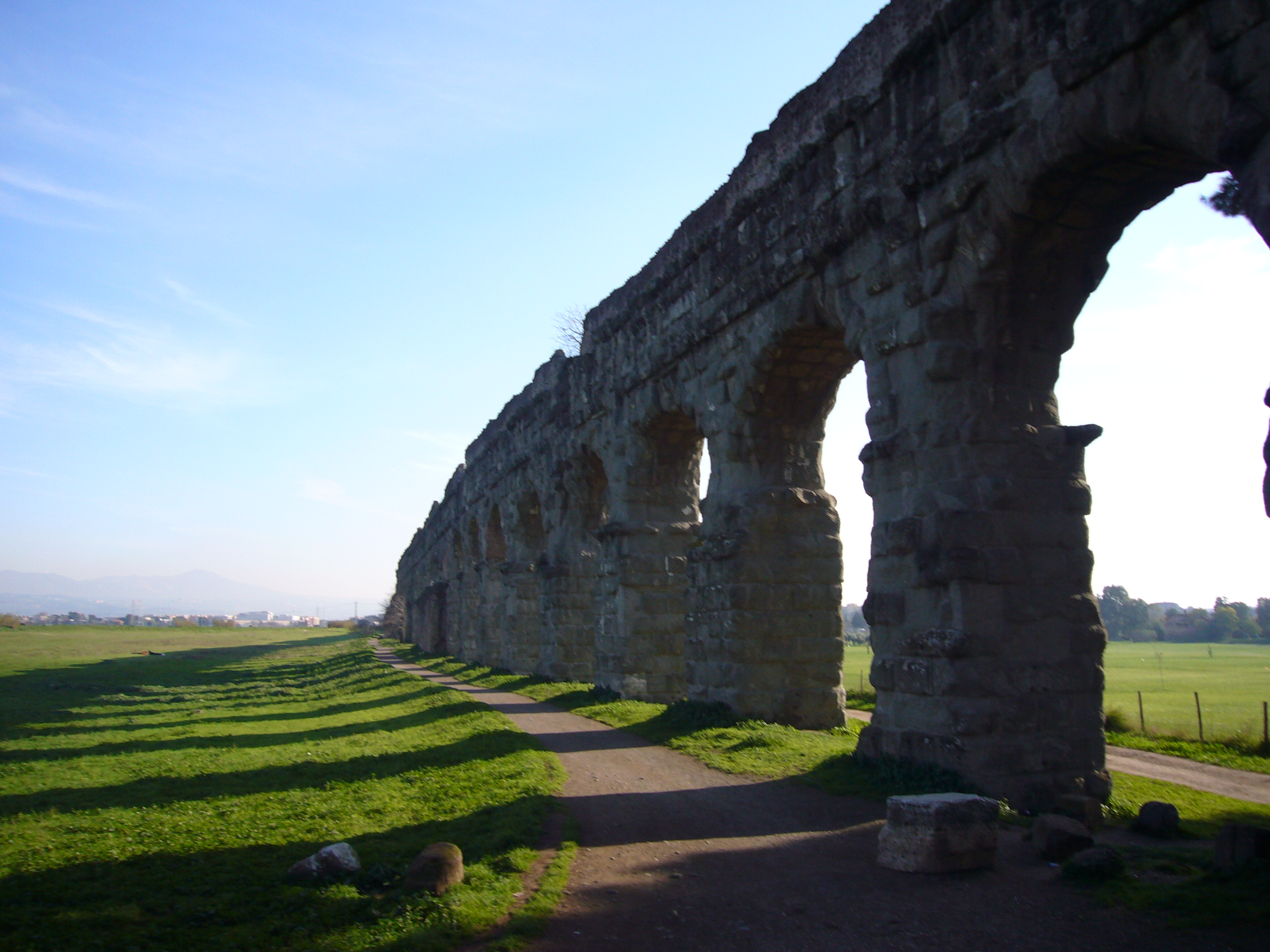

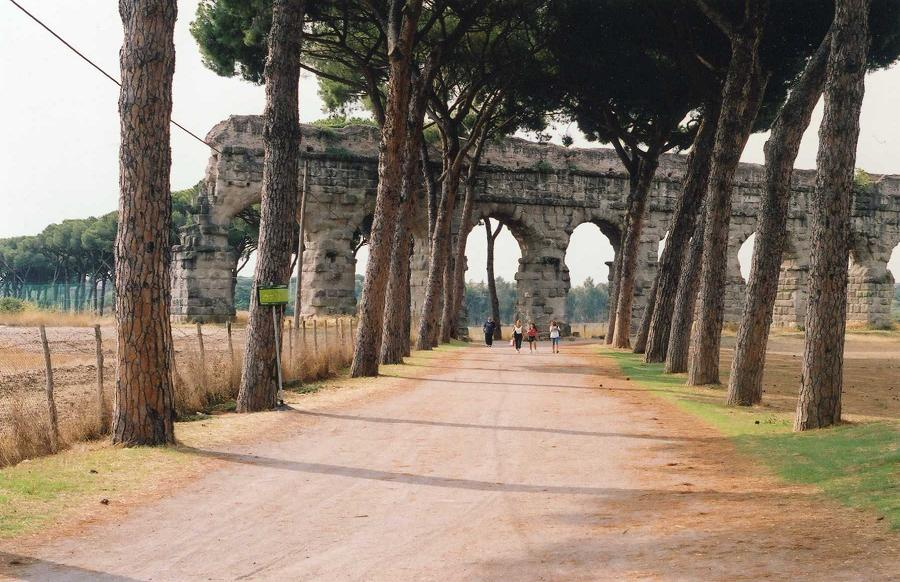

== Transport ==
Given the vastness of the park, it can be reached by various means of transport that connect different areas and entrances of the park. There are four Rome Metro stations located near the Appian Way Regional Park:

- Colli Albani - Parco Appia Antica
- Arco di Travertino
- Subaugusta
- Anagnina
