= Ponte Lungo (Rome Metro) =

Rome metro station

General information
- Coordinates: 41.8780°N 12.5189°E
- Owner: ATAC
- Platforms: Island platform
- Tracks: 2
- Connections: Tuscolana Station

Construction
- Structure type: Underground

History
- Opened: 1980; 46 years ago

Services
Preceding station	Rome Metro	Following station
Re di Roma towards Battistini	Line A	Furio Camillo towards Anagnina
Location
- Click on the map to see marker

Ponte Lungo is a station on the Rome Metro. It is on Line A and is located in Appio Latino, between Re di Roma and Furio Camillo stations.

It is located at the intersection of Via Appia Nuova, Piazza di Ponte Lungo and Via Gela.

This station can be used as an interchange with Tuscolana station, which provides the Lazio Regional Railway services FL1, FL3 and FL5.
