= Re di Roma (Rome Metro) =

Rome metro station

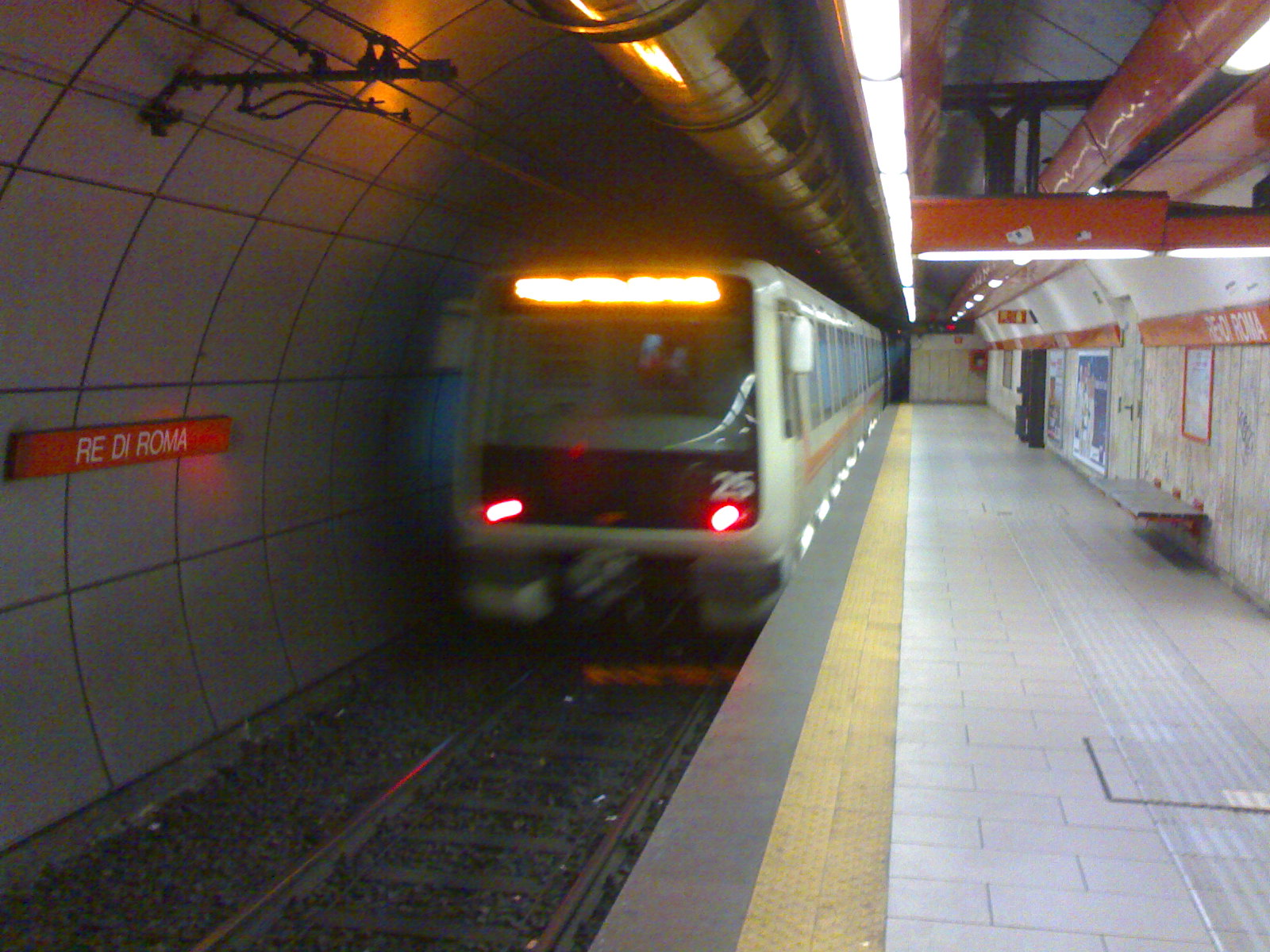

General information
- Coordinates: 41.8819°N 12.5144°E
- Owner: ATAC
- Platforms: Island platform
- Tracks: 2

Construction
- Structure type: Underground

History
- Opened: 1980; 46 years ago

Services
Preceding station	Rome Metro	Following station
San Giovanni towards Battistini	Line A	Ponte Lungo towards Anagnina
Location
- Click on the map to see marker

Re di Roma is a train station on the Rome Metro. It is on Line A and is located in Appio Latino, between San Giovanni and Ponte Lungo stations.

It is located under Piazza Re di Roma, from which it gets its name.
