= Tuscolano =

Q. VIII Tuscolano
- Quartiere of Rome
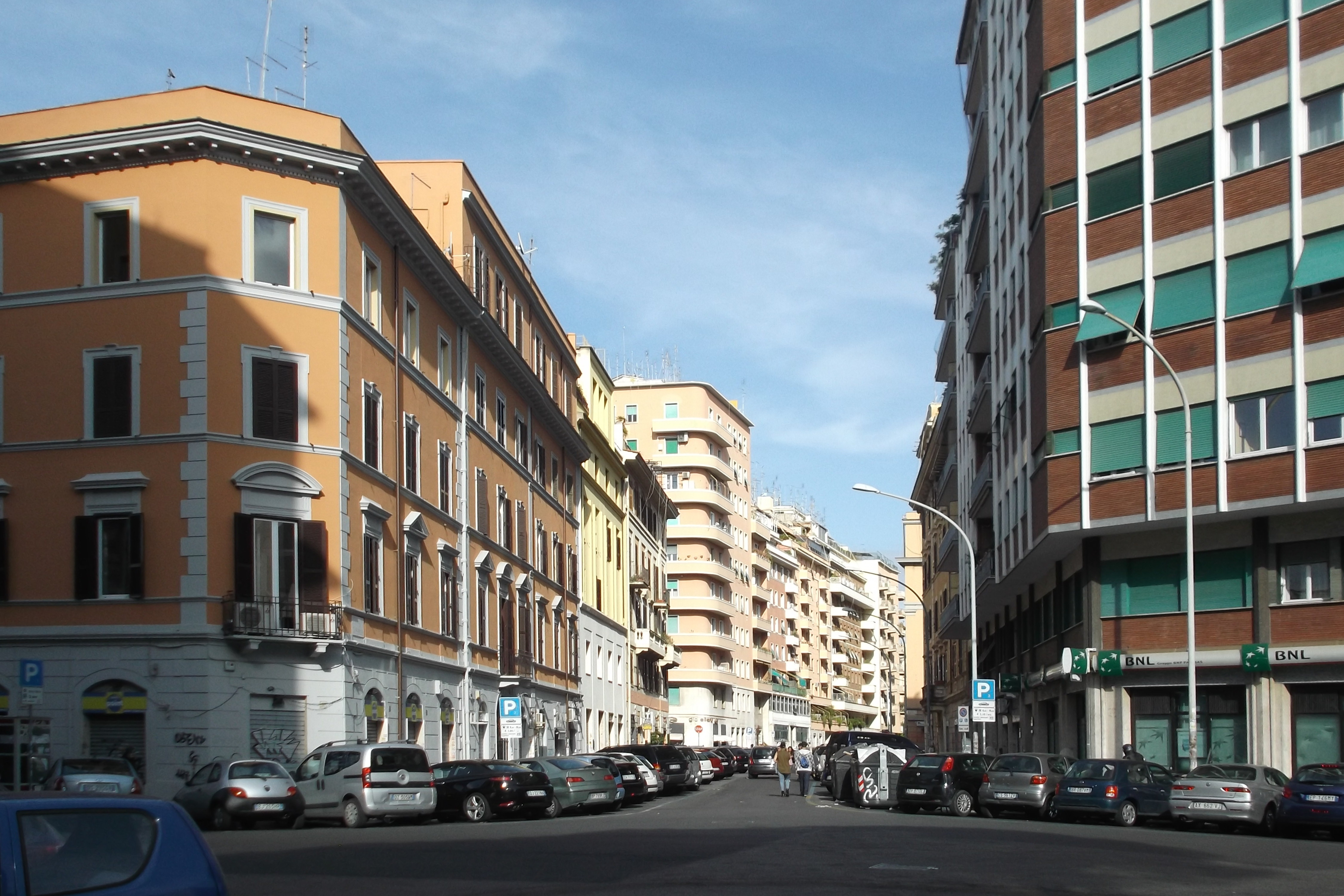
- The beginning of Via Tuscolana in Piazza Sulmona

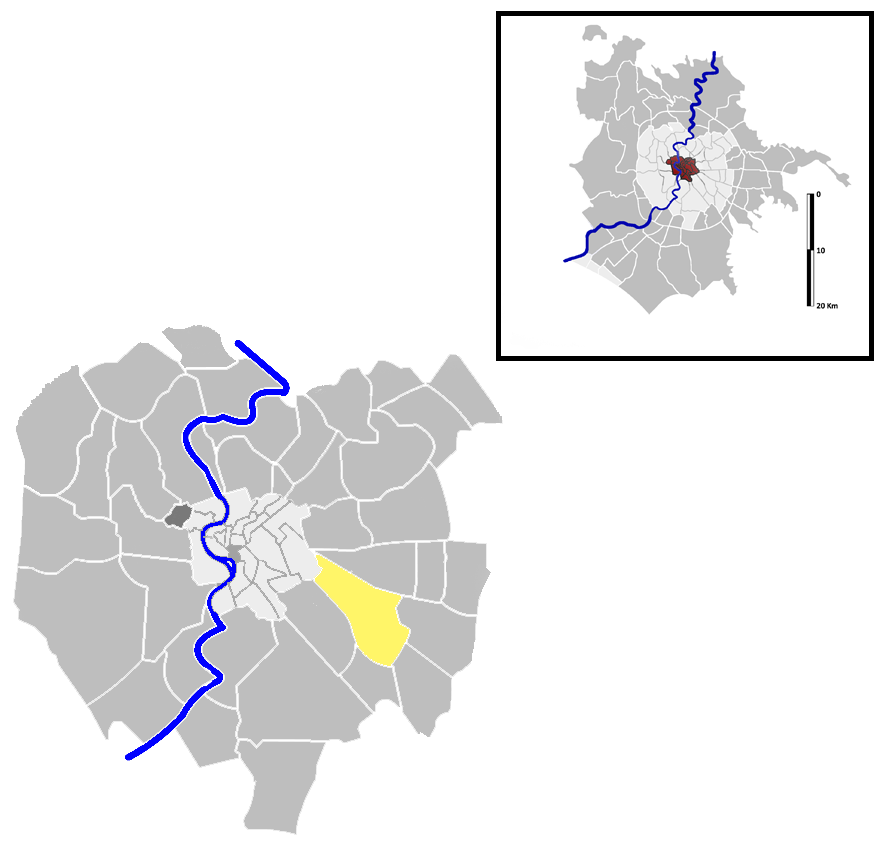
- Position of the quartiere within the city of Rome
- Country: Italy
- Region: Lazio
- Metropolitan City: Rome
- Comune: Rome
- Municipio: Municipio V Municipio VII
- Established: 20 August 1921

Area
  - Total: 2.7634 sq mi (7.1572 km^{2})

Population (2016)
  - Total: 103,446
- Time zone: UTC+1 (CET)
  - Summer (DST): UTC+2 (CEST)

Tuscolano is the 8th quartiere of Rome (Italy), identified by the initials Q. VIII. The name derives from the ancient road Via Tuscolana. It belongs to the Municipio V and Municipio VII.

== History ==
The origins of the territory - which, as for the landscape, social and cultural aspect is now totally similar to Appio-Latino - can be dated back to the Middle Age, when the road that gave it its name, the Via Tuscolana, was first mentioned in a papal seal Honorius III issued in 1217. The road was built to link Rome with Tusculum but does not seem to have a classical origin: nothing to do with the road has the imperial mausoleum known as Monte del Grano (which was related to the nearby Roman villa called Ad Duas Lauros), nor do the columbaria of Via Pescara, which were probably built along a cross street of the Via Labicana. The first archaeological vestige that can be certainly connected to the Via Tuscolana is the Torre del Quadraro, a 12th-century guard tower.

The territory of the quartiere is crossed by five imposing aqueducts built between 144 BC and 212 AD: Aqua Marcia, Aqua Tepula and Aqua Iulia, gathered together within the same structure, Aqua Claudia and Anio Novus, as well as the Aqua Antoniniana, an offshoot of the Aqua Marcia. Up to the 1930s, the territory was also cut through by the Acqua Mariana, which is dated back to 1122 by the Liber Pontificalis: it was commissioned by Pope Callixtus II to allow the irrigation of the Ager Lateranense, the fields surrounding Saint John Lateran.

== Geography ==
The territory of the quarter includes the urban zones 9A Tuscolano Nord, 9B Tuscolano Sud, 9C Tor Fiscale, 6C Quadraro, as well as part of the urban zones 10A Don Bosco and 10B Appio Claudio.

The most relevant roads of the quartiere are Via Tuscolana, Via Appia Nuova and Via Casilina. The nerve center of the traffic is Piazza Re di Roma (which is shared with Quartiere Appio-Latino).

=== Boundaries ===
Northward, Tuscolano borders with Rione Esquilino (R. XV), from which it is separated by the portion of the Aurelian Walls between Piazzale Appio and Piazzale Labicano, and with Quartiere Prenestino-Labicano (Q. VII), whose boundary is outlined by the stretch of Via Casilina between Piazzale Labicano and Via di Centocelle.

Eastward, the quarter borders with Quartiere Don Bosco (Q. XXIV), whose border is marked by Via di Centocelle and Via dell'Aeroporto. To the south-west, it borders with Quartiere Appio Claudio (Q. XXV): the boundary is delineated by the stretch of Via del Quadraro between Via Tuscolana and Via Appia Nuova.

To the south, the quarter borders with Quartiere Appio-Pignatelli (Q. XXVI), from which it is separated by the stretch of Via Appia Nuova between Via del Quadraro and Via dell'Almone.

To the west, Quartiere Tuscolano borders with Quartiere Appio-Latino (Q. IX): the boundary is marked by the stretch of Via Appia Nuova between Via dell'Almone and Piazzale Appio.

=== Odonymy ===
Streets and squares of Tuscolano are mostly named after Italian towns in the northern part, Roman personalities and consuls in the south-eastern part and towns of Lazio in the central part. The roads near the former Centocelle airport are named after prominent aviators. Odonyms of the quarter can be categorized as follows:

- Ancient cities, e.g. Via Cartagine, Via Paestum, Via Sagunto, Via Selinunte, Via Treviri.
- Architects, e.g. Largo and Via Galeazzo Alessi, Via Bartolino da Novara, Via Bernardo Buontalenti, Viale Filarete, Via Francesco Laparelli, Via Muzio Oddi, Via Gabrio Serbelloni.
- Aviators, e.g. Via Giannino Ancillotto, Via Francesco Baracca, Via Giuseppe Cei, Via Amedeo Cencelli, Via Ugo Niutta, Via Natale Palli, Via Orazio Pierozzi, Via Oreste Salomone, Piazza Francesco Zambeccari.
- Historians, e.g. Via Antonio Beccadelli, Piazza Giuseppe Cardinali, Via Camillo Manfroni, Largo Raffaele Pettazzoni, Via Gaetano Salvemini.
- Italian cities, e.g. Via Acireale, Via Aosta, Via Assisi, Piazza Asti, Via Caltagirone, Via Castrovillari, Via Enna, Via Faenza, Via Foligno, Via Gallarate, Via Gela, Piazza Imola, Via La Spezia, Piazza Lodi, Via Monza, Via Mortara, Via Nocera Umbra, Via Orvieto, Via Pescara, Piazza Ragusa, Via Taranto, Via Terni, Via Verbania, Via Vibo Valentia, Via Voghera.
- Local toponyms, e.g. Via dell'Arco di Travertino, Via delle Cave, Via del Mandrione, Via della Stazione Tuscolana, Via di Tor Pignattara, Via di Torre Branca, Via di Torre del Fiscale, Piazza di Villa Fiorelli.
- Prominent Salesians, e.g. Via Giovanni Cagliero, Via Suor Maria Mazzarello, Via Don Filippo Rinaldi, Via Don Rua, Piazza San Domenico Savio, Largo Michele Unia
- Roman deities, e.g. Via Acca Larenzia, Via Cibele, Via Cerere, Via Diana, Via Maia.
- Roman personalities, e.g. Via degli Arvali, Via Camilla, Via Cincinnato, Via Clelia, Via Columella, Viale dei Consoli, Via Demetriade, Via Erennio Modestino, Viale Furio Camillo, Via Muzio Scevola, Largo Orazi e Curiazi, Viale Spartaco, Piazza dei Tribuni, Via delle Vestali, Via Veturia, Via Virginia.
- Towns and regions of Lazio, e.g. Via Albano, Via Allumiere, Via Anzio, Via Aprilia, Via Ariccia, Via Castel Gandolfo, Piazzale dei Castelli Romani, Largo and Via dei Colli Albani, Via Frascati, Via Genzano, Via Grottaferrata, Via Lanuvio, Via Roccagorga, Via Sermoneta, Via Sgurgola, Via Tolfa.

== Places of interest ==
=== Civil buildings ===
- Casale delle Forme, in Piazza dei Tribuni. 16th-century farmstead. 41.865368°N 12.549990°E
- Casale del Parco di Tor Fiscale, in Via dell'Acquedotto Felice. 16th-century farmstead. 41.860103°N 12.544101°E
- Villa La Favorita, in Via Casilina. 18th-century villa.
- Residential buildings of the Istituto Autonomo Case Popolari Appio II, in Via La Spezia. 20th-century public housing buildings (1924).

3 buildings in barocchetto romano style, designed by architect Camillo Palmerini.

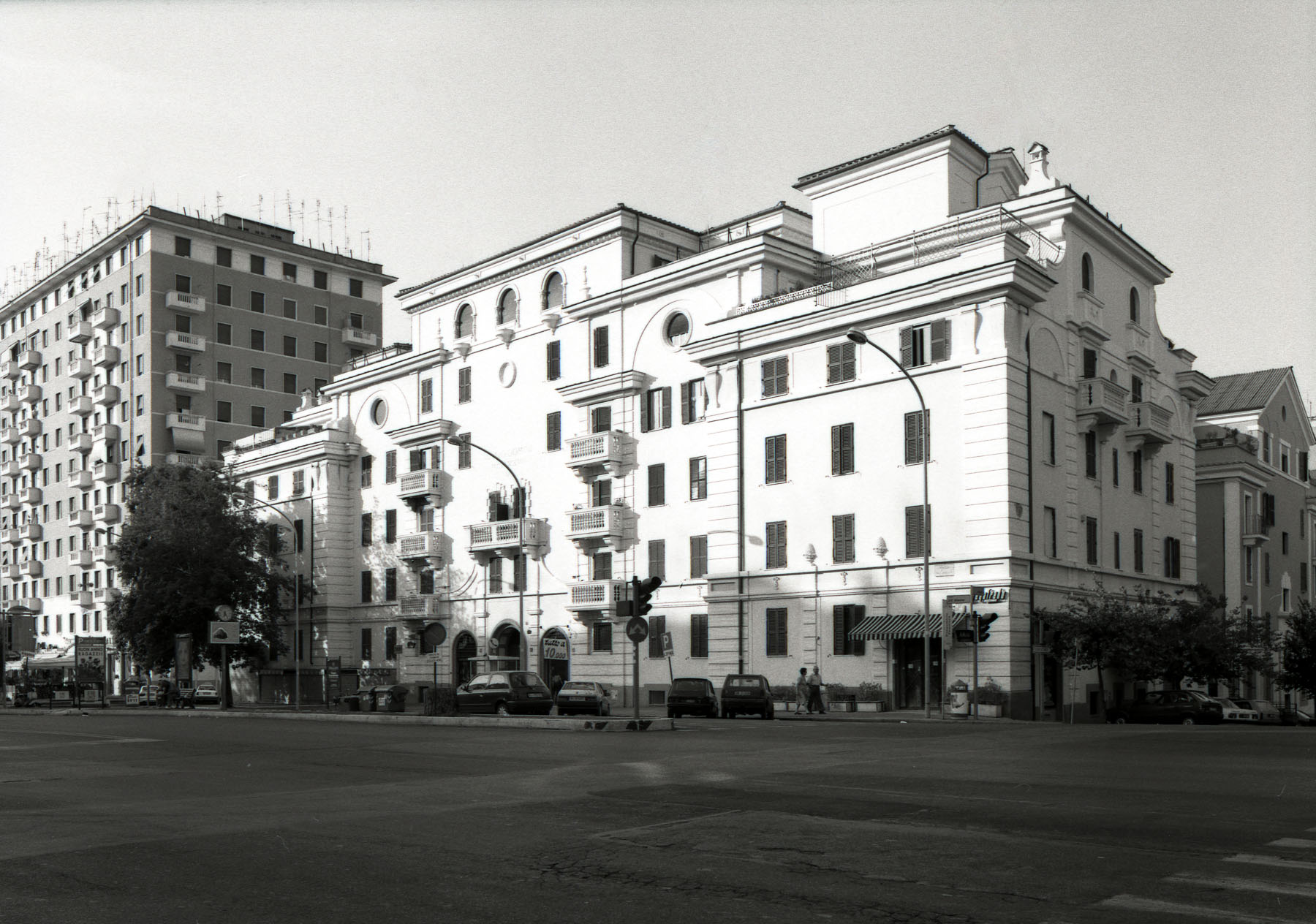
A 1927 residential building in Piazza dell'Alberone, commissioned by the IACP to Camillo Palmerini (1995)

- Residential buildings of the Istituto Autonomo Case Popolari Ponte Lungo, among Via Rea Silvia, Piazza dell'Alberone, Via Veturia and Via Appia Nuova. 20th-century public housing buildings (1927–53). 41.876424°N 12.521383°E

3 buildings in barocchetto romano style, designed by architect Camillo Palmerini.

- Residential buildings of the Istituto Case Popolari near Villa Certosa, between Via Casilina and Via Galeazzo Alessi. 20th-century public housing buildings (1924). 41.882428°N 12.534109°E

designed by architects Alberto Calza Bini and Mario De Renzi.

- Head office of the Istituto di Istruzione Superiore Armando Diaz school, in Via Acireale. 41.887861°N 12.520110°E

Art Nouveau complex designed between 1926 and 1928 by architect Vincenzo Fasolo.

- Palazzo delle Poste, in Via Taranto. 20th-century rationalist post office. (1933–35).

designed by architect Giuseppe Samonà.

=== Religious buildings ===
- Santa Maria del Buon Consiglio a Porta Furba, in Via Tuscolana. 20th-century church (1916).
- Santa Maria Immacolata e San Giuseppe Benedetto Labre, on the corner between Via Taranto and Via Monza. 20th-century church (1928).
- Santa Maria Ausiliatrice, in Piazza di Santa Maria Ausiliatrice. 20th-century church (1931–38).
- Santi Fabiano e Venanzio, in Piazza di Villa Fiorelli. 20th-century church (1933–36).
- Santi Antonio di Padova e Annibale Maria, in Piazza Asti. 20th-century church (1947–48).
- Santo Stefano Protomartire, in Via di Torre del Fiscale. 20th-century church (1954–55).
- Assunzione di Maria, in Largo Spartaco. 20th-century church (1961–70).
- San Giuseppe Cafasso, in Via Camillo Manfroni. 20th-century church (1968).
- San Gaspare del Bufalo, in Via Rocca di Papa. 20th-century church designed by architect Pier Luigi Nervi (1976–81).
- Santa Giulia Billiart, in Viale Antonio Averulino Filarete. 20th-century church (1989–91).
- Santissimo Corpo e Sangue di Cristo, in Via Narni. 20th-century church (1991).

=== Archaeological sites ===
- Sepulchre of Via Filarete, in Viale Antonio Averulino Filarete. 1st-century BC sepulchre 41.881120°N 12.538831°E
- Columbarium of Via Taranto, in Via Pescara. 1st and 2nd-century columbaria. 41.882377°N 12.522630°E
- Tombs of Via Latina, in Via dell'Arco di Travertino. 2nd-century funerary complex at the 3rd mile of the ancient Via Latina.
- Domus del Casale del parco di Tor Fiscale, in Via dell'Acquedotto Felice. Imperial age Roman villa. 41.882377°N 12.522630°E

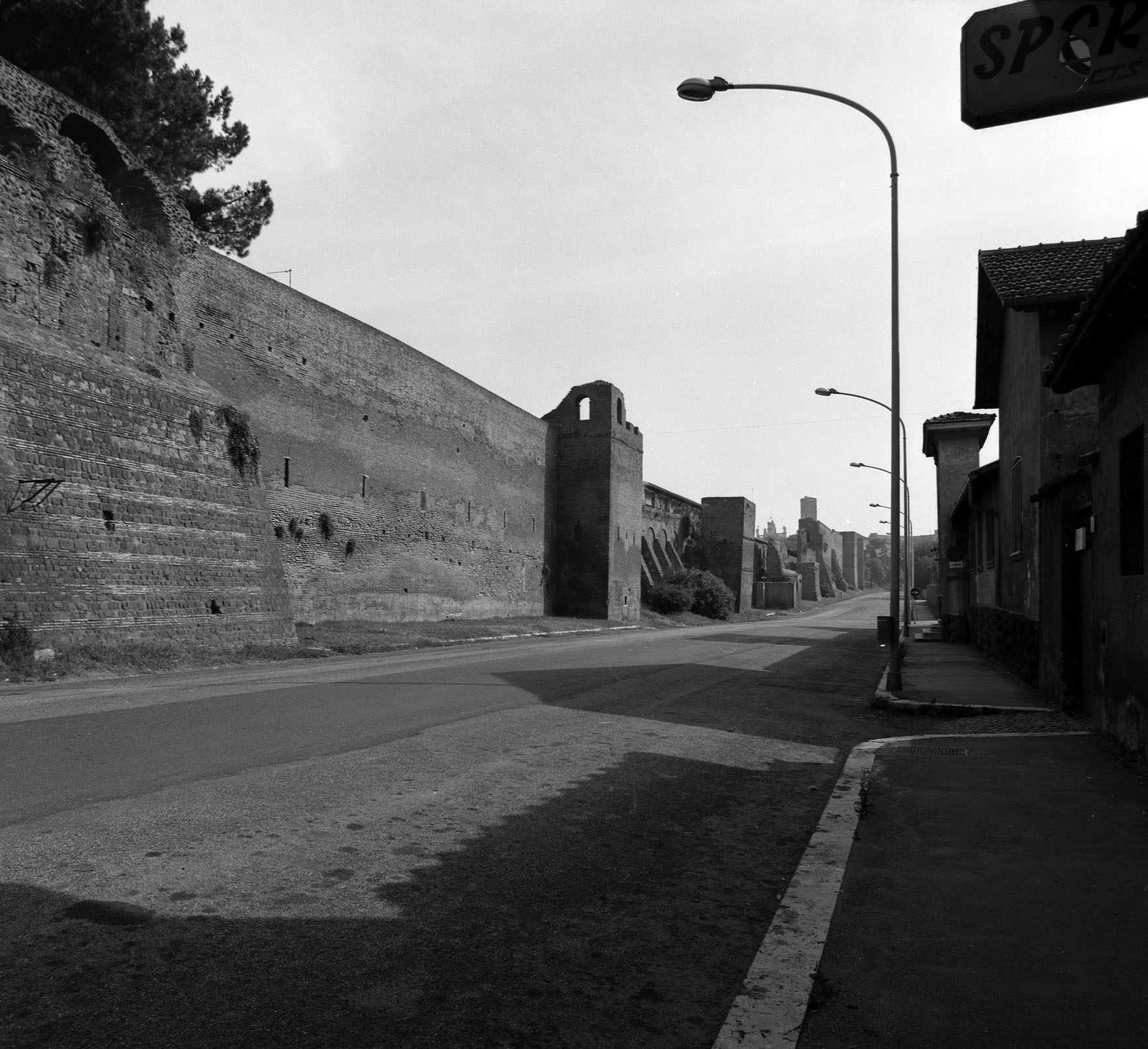
Viale Castrense (1982)

- Aurelian Walls, along Viale Castrense. 41.886418°N 12.510943°E
- Monte del Grano mausoleum, in Piazza dei Tribuni. 3rd-century sepulchre.
- Campo Barbarico mausoleum, on the corner between Via del Campo Barbarico and Via Monte d'Onorio. 3rd-century sepulchre. 41.859115°N 12.540334°E
- Catacombs of San Castulo, in Via San Castulo. 4th-century catacomb.

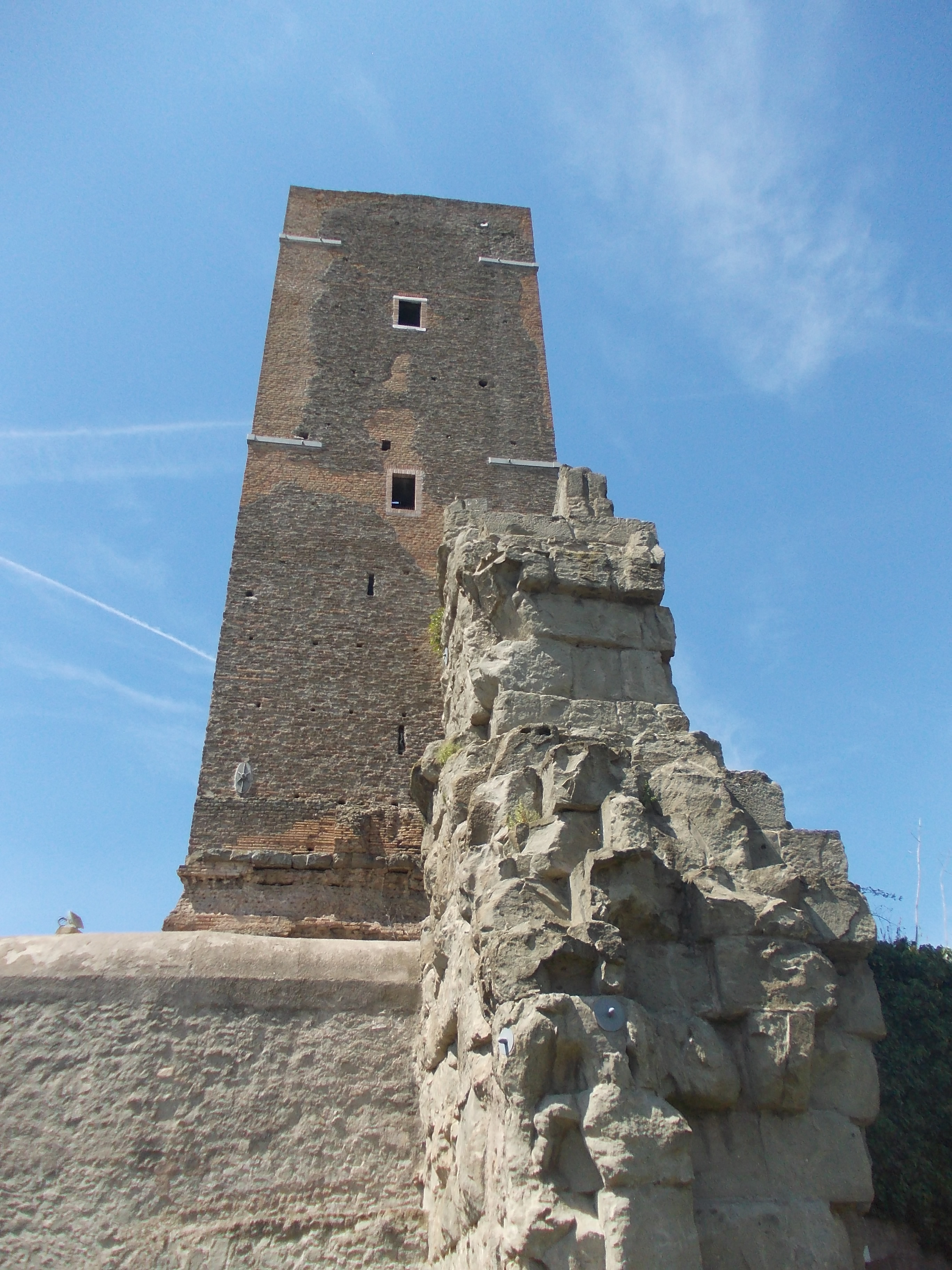
Tor Fiscale.

- Tor Fiscale, in Via Tuscolana. 13th-century tower.
- Porta San Giovanni, in Piazzale Appio.

Aqueducts

- Aqua Marcia.
- Alessandrino aqueduct.
- Aqua Claudia.
- Acqua Felice.
- Pope Clement XII fountain, in Via Tuscolana. 16th-century fountain.
