= Porta Furba - Quadraro (Rome Metro) =

Rome metro station

Porta Furba Quadraro
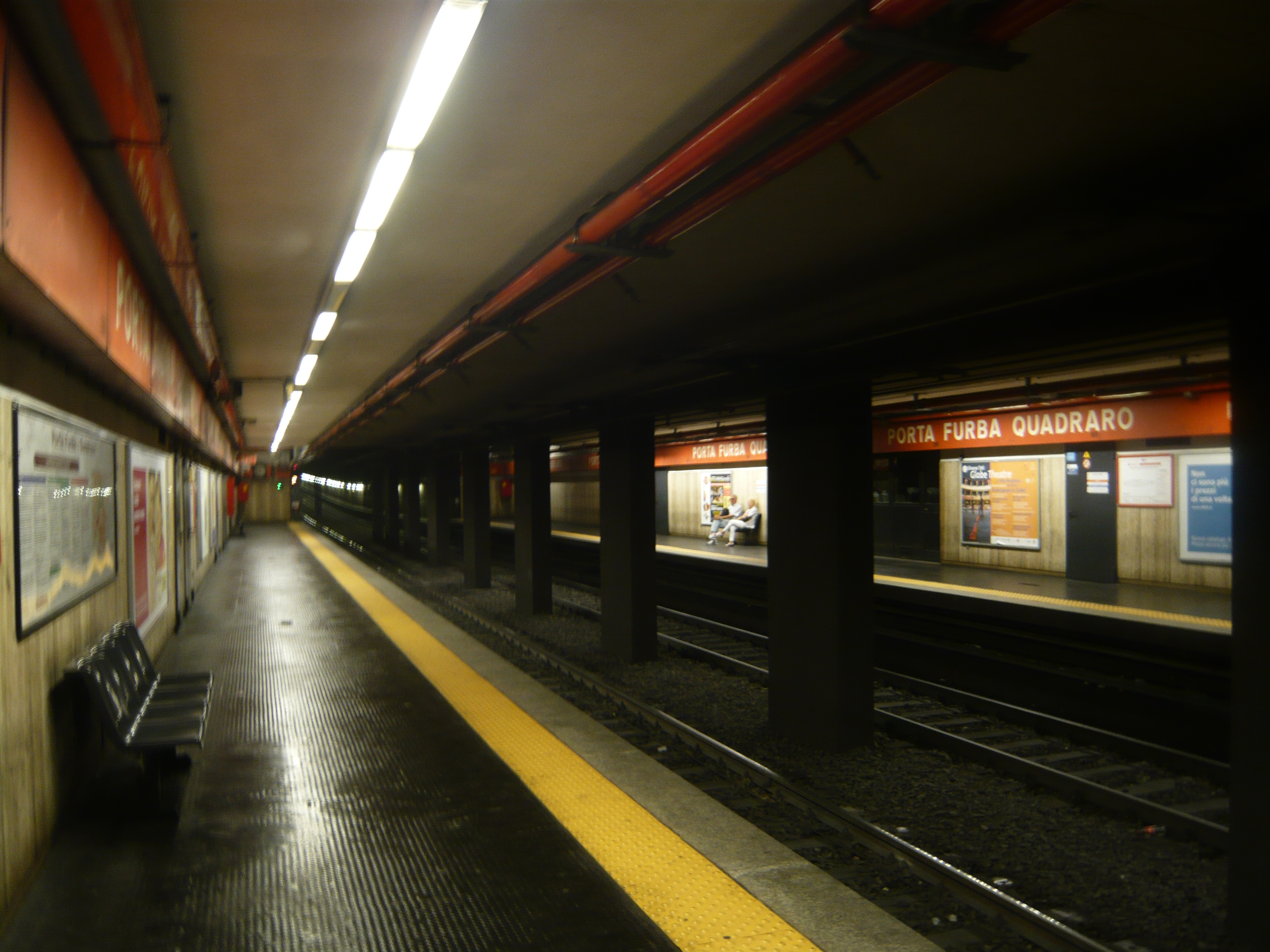

General information
- Coordinates: 41.8638°N 12.5483°E
- Owner: ATAC
- Platforms: Side platform
- Tracks: 2

Construction
- Structure type: Underground

History
- Opened: 1980; 46 years ago

Services
Preceding station	Rome Metro	Following station
Arco di Travertino towards Battistini	Line A	Numidio Quadrato towards Anagnina
Location
- Click on the map to see marker

Porta Furba Quadraro is a station on Line A of the Rome Metro. It is located under the intersection of Via Tuscolana, Via dei Fulvi and Via Monte del Grano.
