= Furio Camillo (Rome Metro) =

Rome metro station

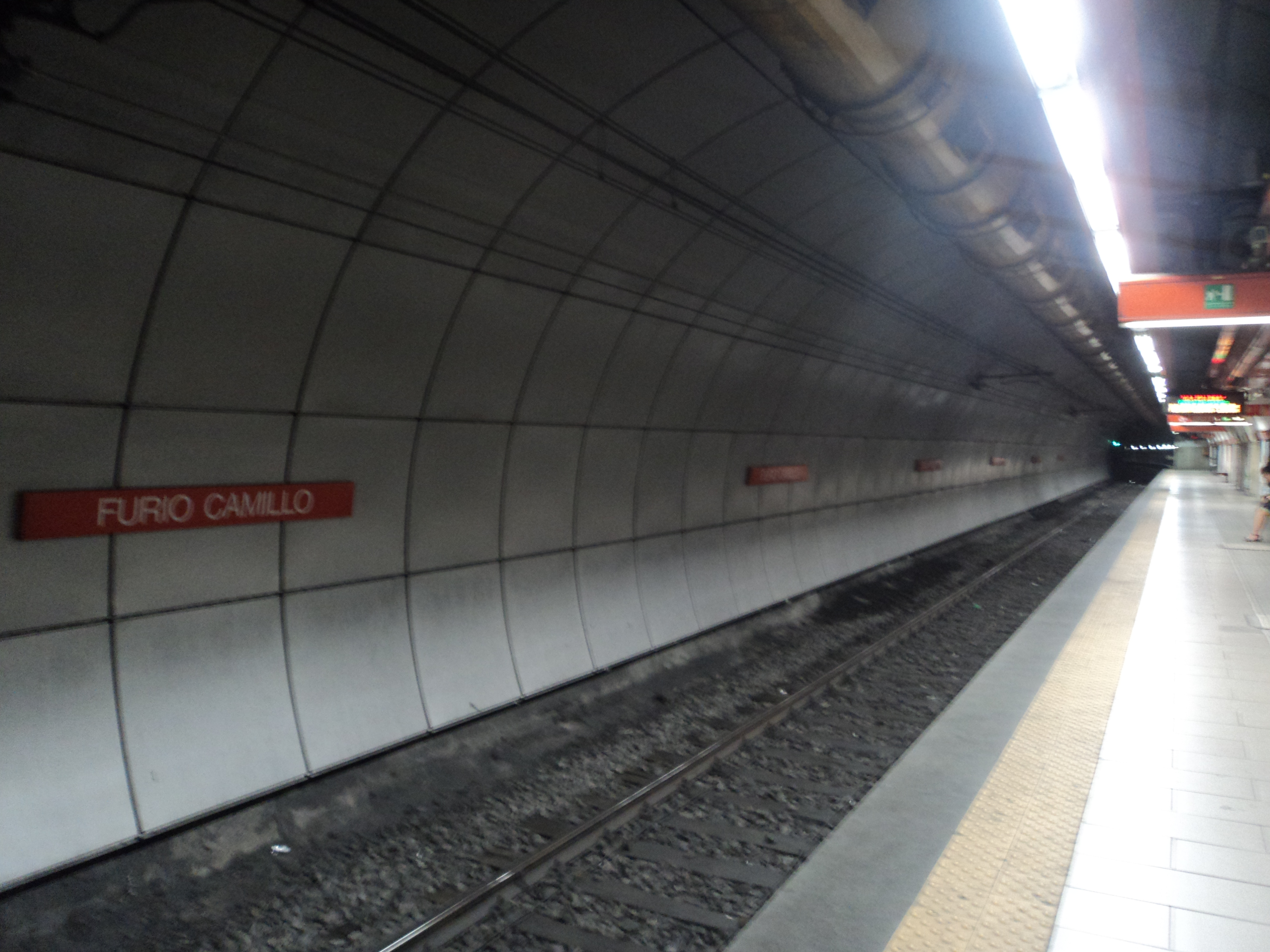

General information
- Location: Appian Way at Viale Furio Camillo, Rome; Italy
- Coordinates: 41°52′29″N 12°31′23″E
- Owner: ATAC

Construction
- Structure type: Underground

History
- Opened: 1980; 46 years ago

Services
Preceding station	Rome Metro	Following station
Ponte Lungo towards Battistini	Line A	Colli Albani towards Anagnina
Location
- Click on the map to see marker

Furio Camillo is an underground station on Line A of the Rome Metro. The station was inaugurated in 1980 and is located under Via Appia Nuova, at the junction of Via Cesare Baronio and Viale Furio Camillo, in an area where roads are named after personalities from the earliest history of Rome and characters from the Aeneid.

== Services ==
This station has:

- Access for the disabled
- Escalators

== Located nearby ==
- Via Appia Nuova
- Via Tuscolana
- Basilica di Santa Maria Ausiliatrice
- Villa Lazzaroni
- Villa Lais
