= Colli Albani (Rome Metro) =

Metro station in Italy

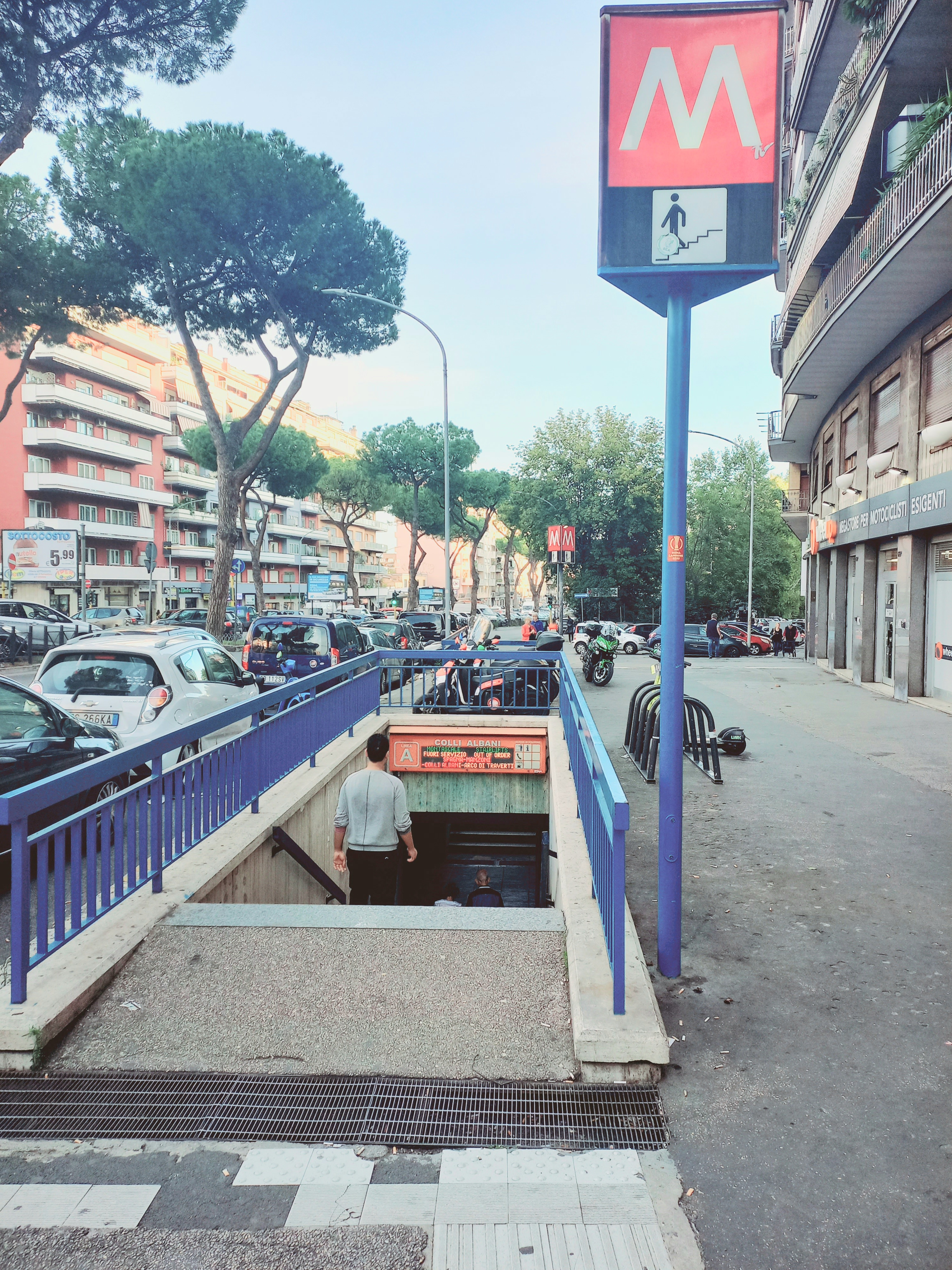

General information
- Coordinates: 41.8694°N 12.5301°E
- Owner: ATAC
- Platforms: Island platform
- Tracks: 2

Construction
- Structure type: Underground

History
- Opened: 1980; 46 years ago

Services
Preceding station	Rome Metro	Following station
Furio Camillo towards Battistini	Line A	Arco di Travertino towards Anagnina
Location
- Click on the map to see marker

Colli Albani is a station on the Rome Metro. It is on Line A and is located in Largo dei Colli Albani, between the Furio Camillo and Arco di Travertino stations.
