= Arco di Travertino (Rome Metro) =

Rome metro station

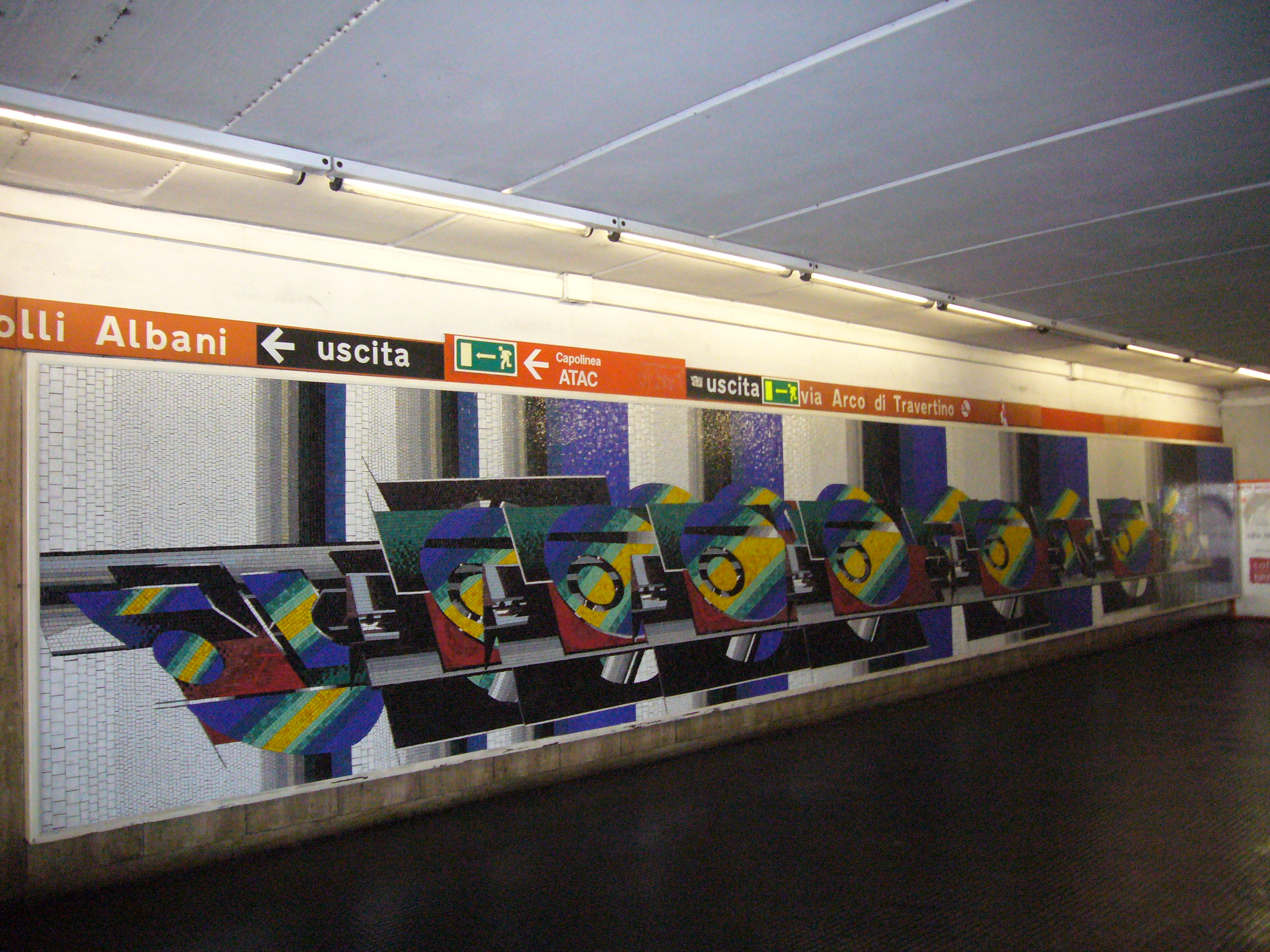

General information
- Coordinates: 41.8659°N 12.5347°E
- Owner: ATAC
- Platforms: Side platform
- Tracks: 2

Construction
- Structure type: Underground

History
- Opened: 1980; 46 years ago

Services
Preceding station	Rome Metro	Following station
Colli Albani towards Battistini	Line A	Porta Furba - Quadraro towards Anagnina
Location
- Click on the map to see marker

Arco di Travertino is a station on Line A of the Rome Metro. It is located in Rome's 9th district, between Colli Albani and Porta Furba stations. It is located under the intersection of Via Arco di Travertino, Via Colli Albani and Largo Lorenzo Cuneo.
