= List of railway stations in Rome =

Railway stations in Rome are operated by the national railway network Rete Ferroviaria Italiana (RFI), and Azienda Strade Lazio S.p.A. ("Lazio Roads Company") (ASTRAL), the public transport operator for the Lazio region.

== Stations ==
=== RFI ===
Stations include:

- Aurelia station
- Balduina station
- Capannelle railway station
- Fiumicino Aeroporto railway station
- Casilina station
- Cesano station
- Fidene station, Colle Salario
- Gemelli station
- La Storta-Formello station
- Monte Mario station Primavalle
- Nomentana station
- Palmiro Togliatti railway station
- Ponte Galeria station
- Roma Prenestina railway station
- Roma San Pietro railway station
- Serenissima railway station
- Roma Termini railway station
- Roma Trastevere railway station
- Roma Tuscolana railway station

=== ASTRAL ===
Stations include:

- Acqua Acetosa railway station
- Euclide railway station
- Montebello railway station
- Roma Porta San Paolo railway station
- Termini-Laziali (Rome–Giardinetti railway)
- Piazzale Flaminio railway station

== See also ==
- Rome–Ancona railway
- Rome–Cassino–Naples railway
- Rome–Fiumicino railway
- Rome-Florence railway
- Rome–Formia–Naples railway
- Rome–Frascati railway
- Rome–Lido railway
- Rome-Pisa railway
