= Villa Glori =

Park in Rome

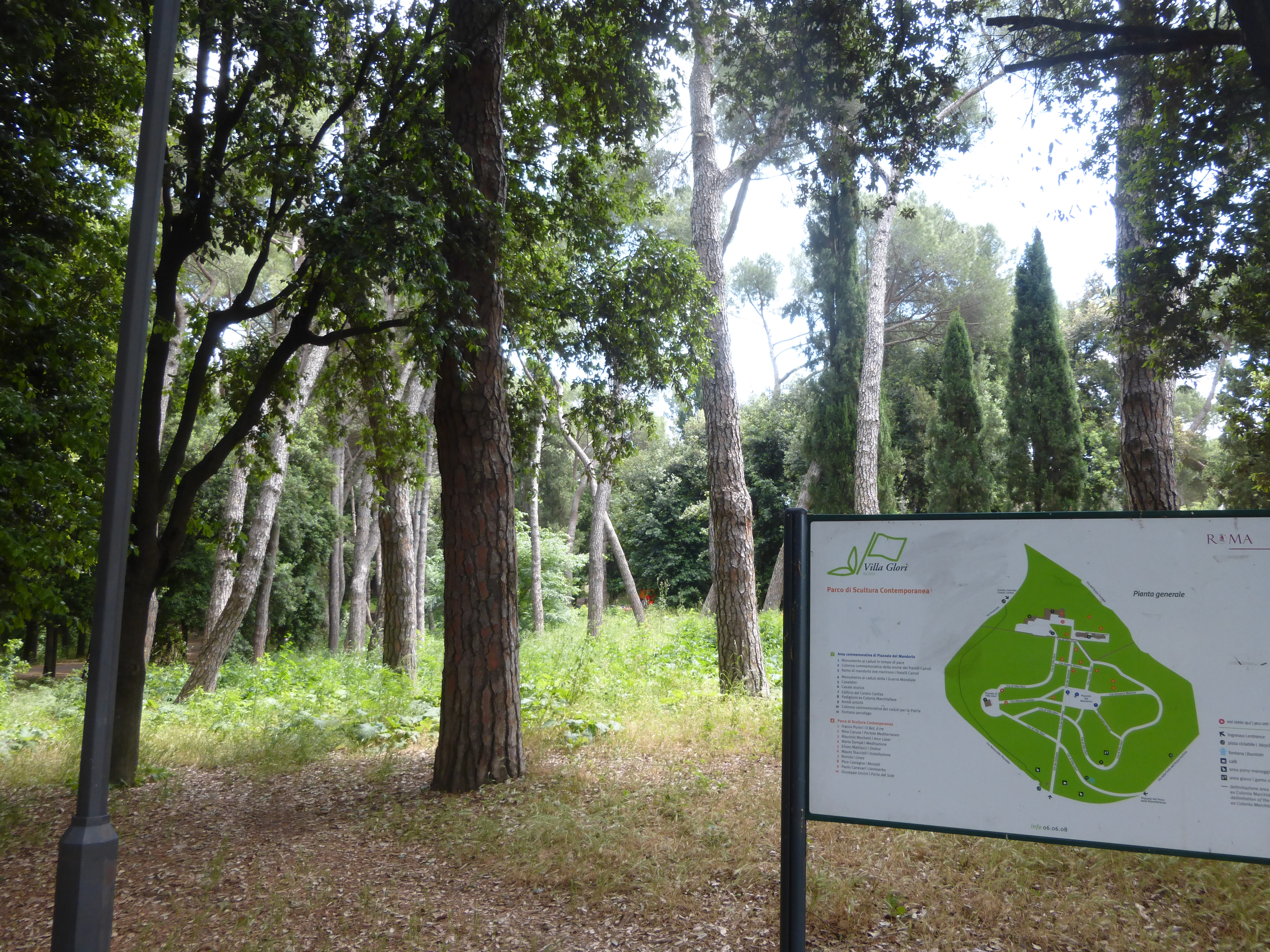
- Interactive map of Villa Glori
- Location: Rome (Italy)
- Coordinates: 41°55′51″N 12°28′50″E
- Area: 25 hectares (62 acres)
- Created: 1924

Villa Glori is a 25-hectare (62-acre) city park in Rome, Italy, within the Municipio II and the quarter Parioli. It is also called Parco della Rimembranza (Italian for Park of Remembrance).

The park occupies a roughly quadrangular cliff – which is in fact the north-west end of the Monti Parioli – looking steeply towards the Tiber in the area of Acqua Acetosa and overhanging the Olympic Village and the Parco della Musica. It can be accessed from Piazzale del Parco della Rimembranza and Via Maresciallo Pilsudski.

== History ==
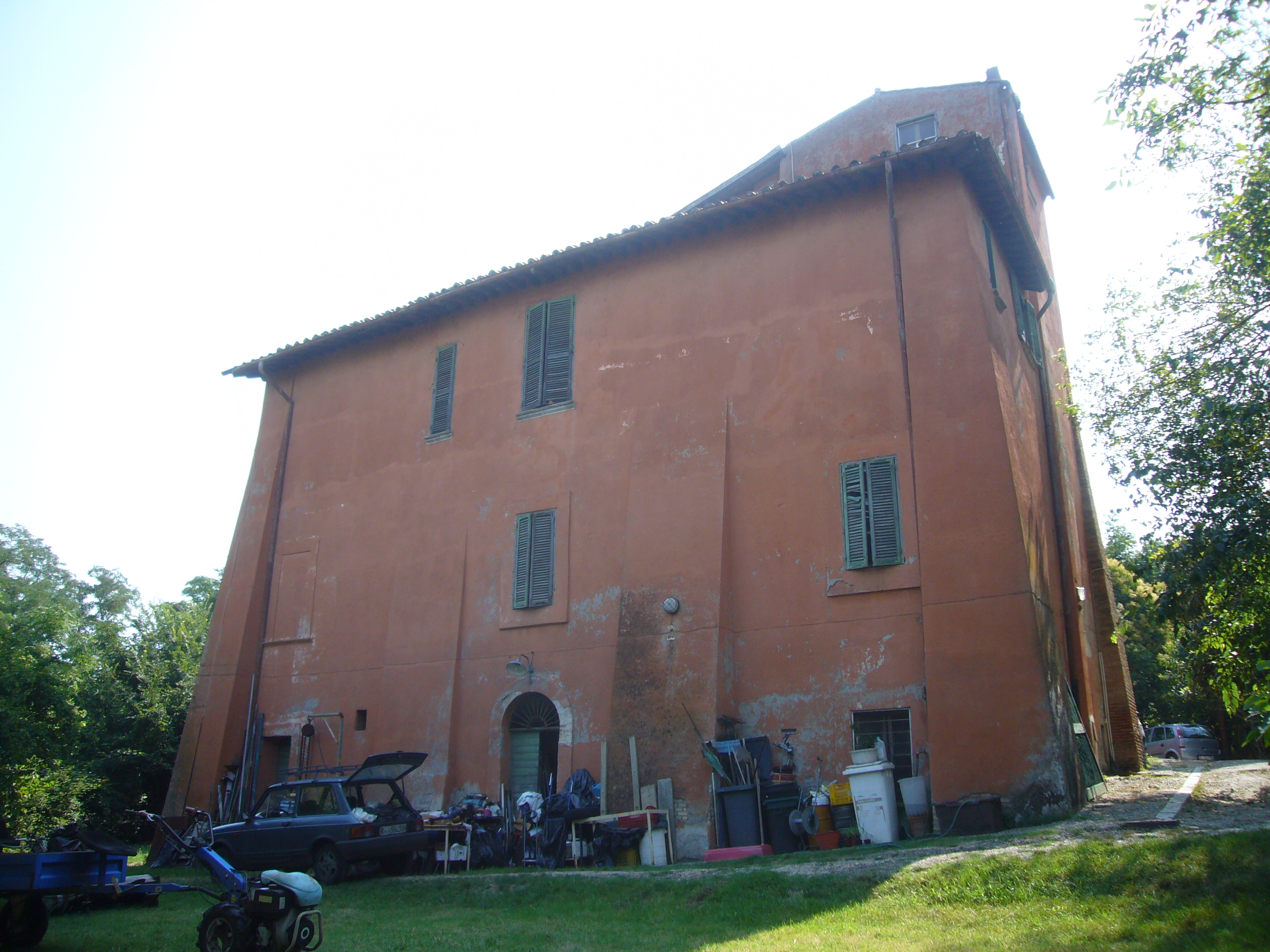
The fortified casale.

Unlike the historic villas of Rome, Villa Glori was not born as a suburban villa, but as a rustic space intended for vineyards and hunting, so much so that the oldest building is a simple fortified farmhouse (casale), repeatedly remodeled and not even among the most beautiful of those scattered in the Roman Campagna

A first idea of the park was born at the beginning of the 19th century, when a never realized Napoleonic project included it in a Passeggiata Flaminia – the prolongation along Via Flaminia of the urban space that Giuseppe Valadier had gloriously concluded in piazza del Popolo – on the model of those that were being created in the rest of Europe.

In the context of the campaign for the liberation of Rome of 1867, the area was the scene of the battle of Villa Glori, where the patriot Enrico Cairoli, among others, met his death. Cesare Pascarella immortalized the episode with a collection of 25 Sonnets entitled Villa Gloria, published in 1886, which is one of the very few examples of civil poetry in Romanesco dialect.

Soon after the capture of Rome, the 1883 master plan already included the idea of a vast green space between the Parioli and Ponte Milvio and for this purpose the expropriations were started. At the time the hill had passed from the Boncompagni to the engineer Vincenzo Glori, to whom Pius IX had entrusted the construction of the new Ponte Mammolo; the villa was then named after the latter owner.

An hippodrome for trotting races was built in 1908 in the plain under the cliff, in a location still very close to the historic center. The facility was operational until the end of 1950s, when it was replaced by the much larger Hippodrome of Tor di Valle, while on the site of the former hippodrome of Villa Glori the Olympic Village was built.

In 1923 the villa, formerly owned by Glori, was turned into a public park to commemorate the fallen of the Great War and was called (as in many other Italian cities) Parco della Rimembranza, though it also maintained the original name of Villa Glori. The design of the new park was entrusted to the architect Raffaele De Vico and consisted mainly in the realization of the central square and of a network of avenues, as well as the planting of over 6,000 trees and shrubs. The inauguration took place in 1924.

In 1929 three pavilions dedicated to Ettore Marchiafava were built at the top of the hill, intended as a dispensary and summer colony for poor children at risk of tuberculosis. For the same purposes, a few years later a school was built next to it, alongside the old casale. In continuity with this sanitary tradition, since 1988 the former facilities, partially restored, have been entrusted to Roman Caritas, which has installed there a foster home housing AIDS patients.

== Monuments and places of interest ==
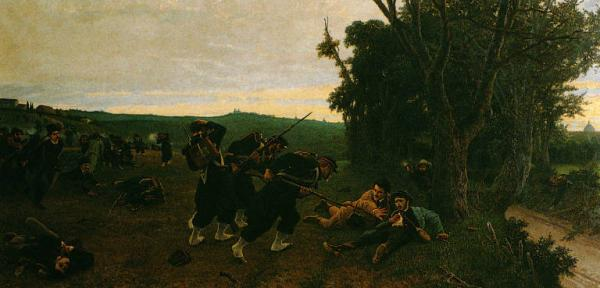
The death of Enrico Cairoli by Carlo Ademollo (1868).

Among the various monuments in the villa, worthy of mention are:

- The dried almond tree, near which Enrico Cairoli was killed;
- The commemorative column of the fallen of 1867;
- An oak grove commemorating the fallen during World War I;
- A farmhouse used by the companions of the Cairoli brothers during the battle of Villa Glori.

=== Path of contemporary sculpture Varcare la Soglia ===
In 1997, at the suggestion of the art critic Daniela Fonti, the Municipality of Rome established a permanent exhibition of contemporary sculpture called Varcare la Soglia ("Crossing the threshold"), aimed at integrating nature and art. In 2000 the exhibition acquired two new works: Gate of the Sun by Giuseppe Uncini and Grass-man by Paolo Canevari.

The exhibition also hosts works by Maria Dompè, Eliseo Mattiacci, Maurizio Mochetti, Nino Caruso, Pino Castagna, Jannis Kounellis, Nunzio and Mauro Staccioli.

== Surroundings ==
- Piazza Euclide
- Parco della Musica
- Olympic Village
- Fontana dell'Acqua Acetosa
- Mosque of Rome
- Villa Glori Hypogeum

== Transports ==
- Piazza Euclide / Acqua Acetosa (Rome–Civitacastellana–Viterbo railway)

== Bibliography ==
- Alberta Campitelli, Villa Glori in Gli anni del Governatorato (1926–1944), pp. 169–172, Series Quaderni dei monumenti, Rome, Edizioni Kappa, 1995. ISBN 88-7890-181-4.
- Daniela Fonti, Il parco di scultura di Villa Glori, Rome, De Luca Editori d'Arte, 2000
