= Euclide railway station =

Railway station in Rome, Italy

Euclide railway station Stazione ferroviaria di Euclide
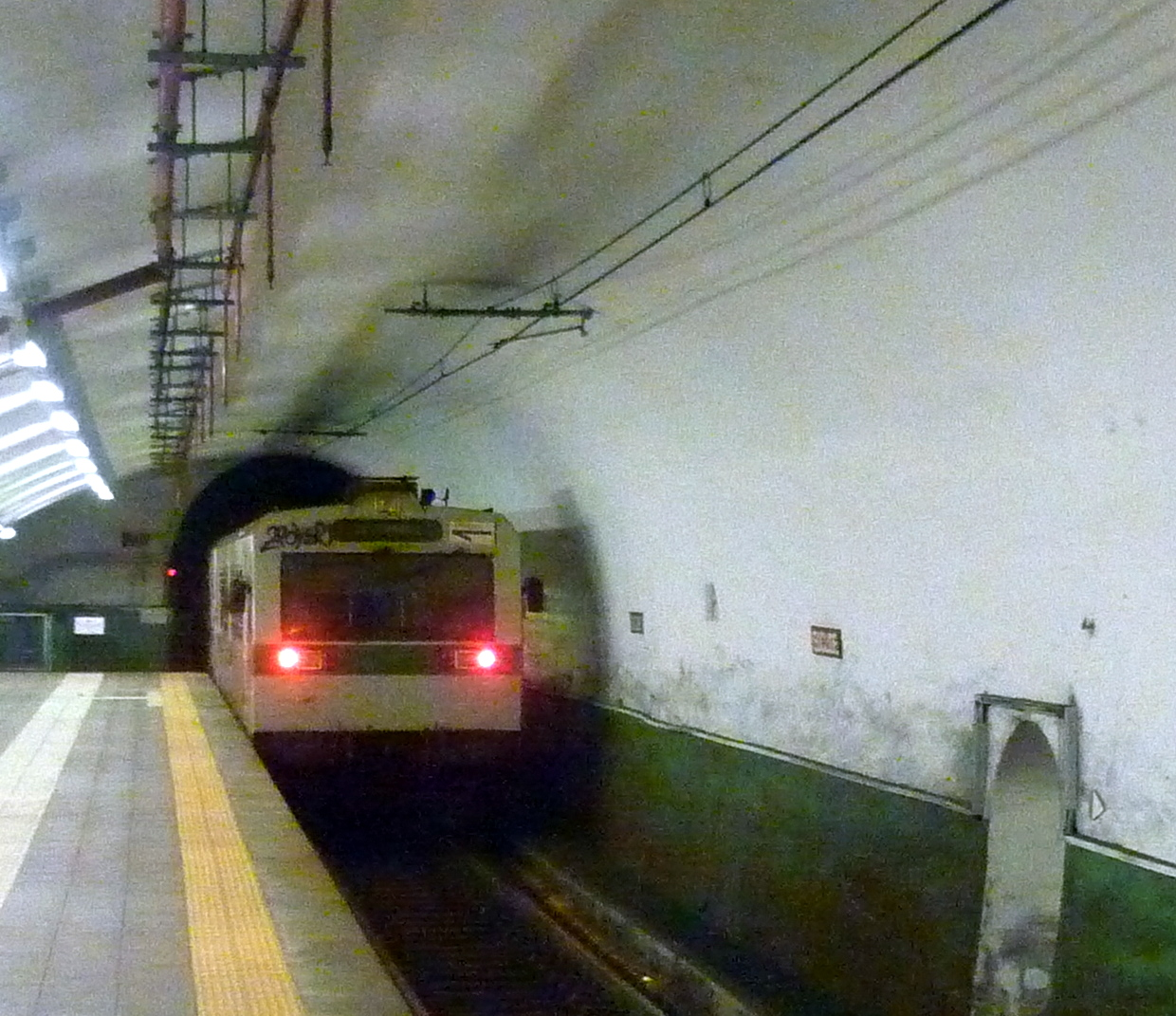

General information
- Location: Piazza Euclide, 00197 Rome; Pinciano; Italy
- Coordinates: 41.9266°N 12.4813°E

Construction
- Structure type: Underground

History
- Opened: 15 January 1958

Services
Preceding station	Cotral	Following station
Piazzale Flaminio Terminus	Rome–Viterbo	Acqua Acetosa (extra-urban) towards Viterbo
Piazzale Flaminio Terminus	Rome–Viterbo	Acqua Acetosa (urban) towards Montebello
Location
- Click on the map for a fullscreen view

The Euclide railway station is a railway station in Rome (Italy), on the Rome–Civitacastellana–Viterbo railway, managed by ASTRAL (Lazio). It is the only underground stop of the line, excluding the Flaminio terminus.

The official name of the facility is Stazione Euclide, as shown on the signs visible from the square; in the past, however, it was indicated on the railway timetables as Roma P. Euclide or, in another source, as p.za Euclide.

== Location ==
The stop is located in the urban track of Rome, in Piazza Euclide, in the quarter Pinciano on the border with the quarter Parioli; it is accessed from one of the buildings located on the square, on the corner with Via Civinini, in front of the Basilica of the Immaculate Heart of Mary. The platforms are accessed via a first flight of stairs leading to the mezzanine, followed by two further flights leading to the two side platforms.

It is one of the stops of the line that record the most traffic, since it is located in a densely inhabited area with a high number of offices. The facility serves the residential quarters Parioli and Pinciano.

== History ==
In 1947 the city administration of Rome requested the construction of a stop on the underground section of the Rome–Civitacastellana–Viterbo railway, then under renovation to double it. The location of Piazza Euclide was chosen, since it represented an important traffic junction for the quarters Flaminio and Parioli.

The project was approved by the Higher Council for Public Works in 1948, but it took until March 1952 to obtain the ministerial decree authorizing the work. The delay was also caused by a public litigation about actual plans for works. Rumors spread that SFRN was secretly building a deviation after Euclide station in order to reach Termini station and join the line with the Termini-EUR subway (now part of Line B) that was being built at the time.

The construction therefore began in 1953 and the stop was inaugurated on 15 January 1958.

The total cost was around 500 million lire.

In the summer of 2009 the station was closed due to renovation and upgrading works that affected the whole urban section of the line; during the approximately 70 days of interruption, the platforms were raised to achieve the ground-level boarding; furthermore, the architectural barriers were eliminated thanks to the installation of stairlifts and the creation of guided paths for partially sighted people. The fire-fighting system was also renewed and a new lighting system was installed as well.

== Surroundings ==
- Teatro Euclide
- Piazza Euclide
- Villa Glori
- Auditorium Parco della Musica
- Villaggio Olimpico
- Stadio Flaminio
- Palazzetto dello Sport
- Basilica Minore del Sacro Cuore di Maria
- Fountain of Anna Perenna

== Services ==
The station has:

- Ticket office
- Ticket machine

== Interchanges ==
- ATAC bus stop

== Bibliography ==
- M. Canevelli, La fermata sotterranea di Piazza Euclide della ferrovia Roma-Civitacastellana-Viterbo, in "Trasporti Pubblici", Rome 1958.
- Vittorio Formigari, Piero Muscolino, La metropolitana a Roma, Calosci, Cortona, 1983, pp. 210–245.
