= Tourism in Rome =

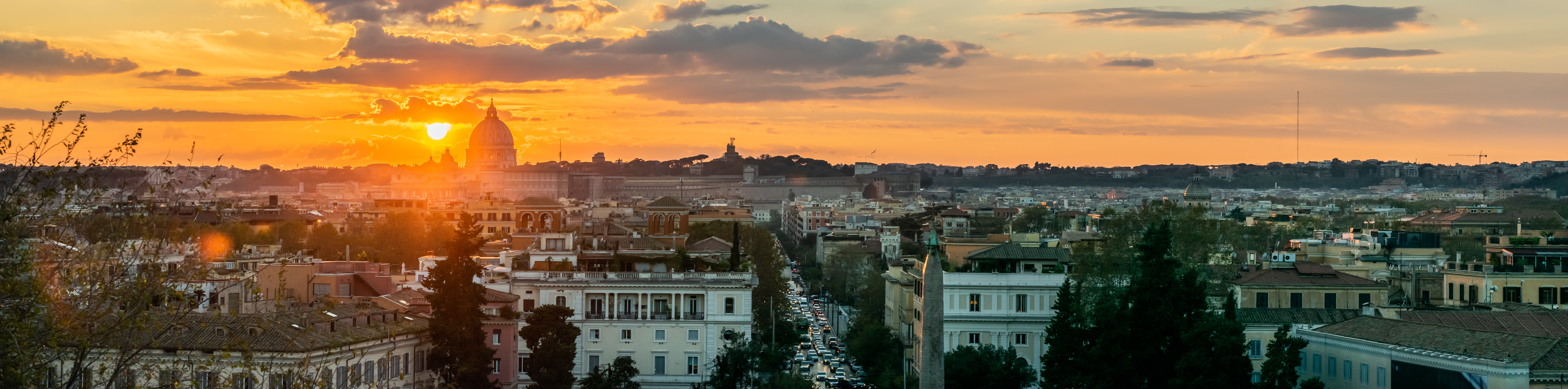
View of Rome and St. Peter's Basilica from the Pincian Hill. The iconic dome dominates the skyline of Rome.

Rome is a tourist destination of archaeological and artistic significance. Among the most significant resources are museums – (Capitoline Museums, the Vatican Museums, Galleria Borghese)—aqueducts, fountains, churches, palaces, historical buildings, the monuments and ruins of the Roman Forum, and the Catacombs. Rome is the 2nd most visited city in the EU, after Paris, and receives an average of 7–10 million tourists a year, which sometimes doubles on holy years. The Colosseum (4 million tourists) and the Vatican Museums (4.2 million tourists) are the 39th and 37th (respectively) most visited places in the world, according to a 2009 study. In 2005 the city registered 19.5 million of global visitors, up of 22.1% from 2001. In 2006, Rome was visited by 6.03 million international tourists, reaching 8th place in the ranking of the world's 150 most visited cities. The city has also been nominated 2007's fourth most desirable city to visit in the world, according to lifestyle magazine Travel + Leisure, after Florence, Buenos Aires and Bangkok. Rome is the city with the most monuments in the world.

== History of Rome ==
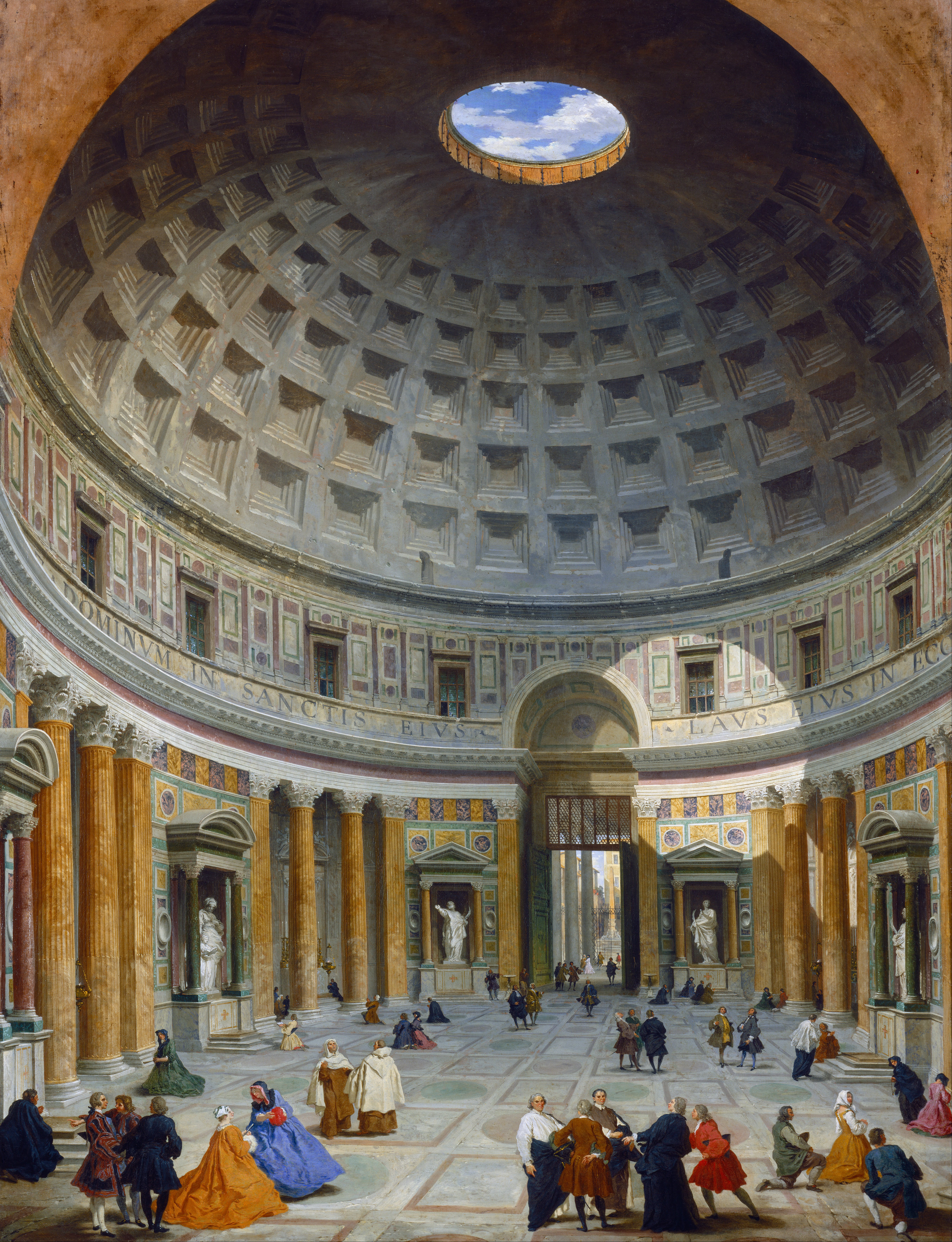
The interior of the Pantheon, by Giovanni Paolo Panini. This is a painting from the Grand Tour.

Rome has been one of the world's most visited cities for the past two millennia. In the Roman times, Rome was the centre and the most powerful city of Western Civilization, ruling all the Mediterranean, Northern Africa, England and parts of the Middle East. Afterwards, it became one of the most important cities in Christianity, since the pope, the head of the Roman Catholic Church, resided and still lives in Rome. It became a worldwide centre of pilgrimage, and later in the Renaissance, as the city became a major European capital of the arts, education, philosophy and trade, it became an important crossroads for bankers, artists and other people in general.

Later, in the 17th, 18th and 19th centuries, the city was one of the centres of the Grand Tour, when wealthy, young English aristocrats visited the city to learn about ancient Roman culture, art, philosophy and architecture. Towards the 1840s, the first sort of mass-tourism began, and Rome became an extremely popular attraction for not only British people, but for people of all around the world. The number of tourists, however, fell dramatically towards the 1870s, when Rome became a battle-ground for revolutionaries and one of the homes of the Risorgimento, and remained like that except for a brief period in the 1920s.

However, since Rome escaped World War II relatively unscathed, unlike Milan or Naples, it became an extremely popular and fashionable city in the 1950s and 60s, when numerous films such as Roman Holiday, Ben Hur and more famously La Dolce Vita were filmed in the city. Numerous stars, actors, actresses and celebrities, such as Federico Fellini, Audrey Hepburn, Gregory Peck and Anita Ekberg, lived or stayed in Rome, especially along its Via Veneto, where most major Roman hotels were and still are found.

After a brief fall in the number of tourists in the 1980s (due to some terrorist activity led by the Red Brigades and political scandals), the city has now become one of the world's most popular tourist attractions.

== Tourist attractions ==
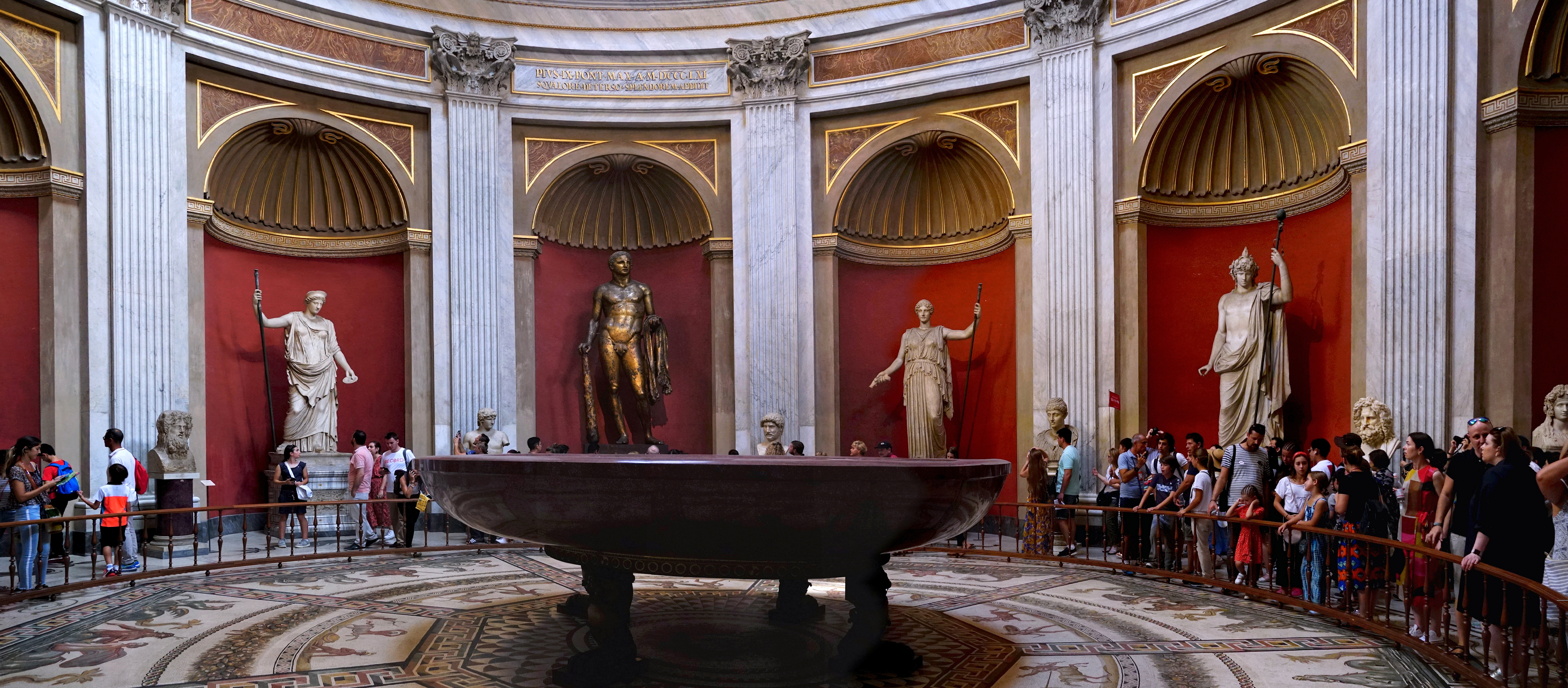
The Round Hall (Sala Rotonda) in the Vatican Museums

The Colosseum Archaeological Park and St. Peter's Basilica are the most popular destinations in Rome, they are included in the list of most visited palaces and monuments.

Other sites include the Vatican Museums, Pantheon, Victor Emmanuel II Monument, the Trevi Fountain, the Spanish Steps, Via Condotti, Via Veneto, the Capitoline Museums, the Villa Borghese gardens, the Villa Giulia, Piazza Navona, the Basilica di Santa Maria Maggiore, the Archbasilica of Saint John Lateran, the Piazza del Popolo, the Castel Sant'Angelo, the Campo de' Fiori, the Quirinal Palace, the Lateran Palace and the Palazzo Barberini, among others.

=== List of visitors per attraction ===
List of the main attractions for visitors in Rome and the Vatican City, data from the Italian Ministry of Culture and the municipality of Rome:

Rank	Museums and monuments	2023	Variation 23/22
1	Colosseum Archaeological Park • Arch of Constantine • Roman Forum	12,298,246	+25,34%
2	St. Peter's Basilica • Apostolic Palace	11,000,000	–
3	Vatican Museums	6,764,858	-2% (compared to 2019)
4	Pantheon	5,196,109	+5,47%
5	Vittoriano • Palazzo Venezia	4,042,739	+36,41%
6	Castel Sant'Angelo	1,321,834	+36,75%
7	Hadrian's Villa • Villa d'Este in Tivoli	748,656	+37,74%
8	Galleria Borghese	590,891	+8,56%
9	Capitoline Museums	411,217 (2022)	–
10	Museo Nazionale Romano	318,434	+58,77%
11	Ostia Antica Archaeological Park	314,511	+26,64%
12	Villa Torlonia • Casino Nobile • Casina delle Civette	235,144 (2022)	–

== Districts ==
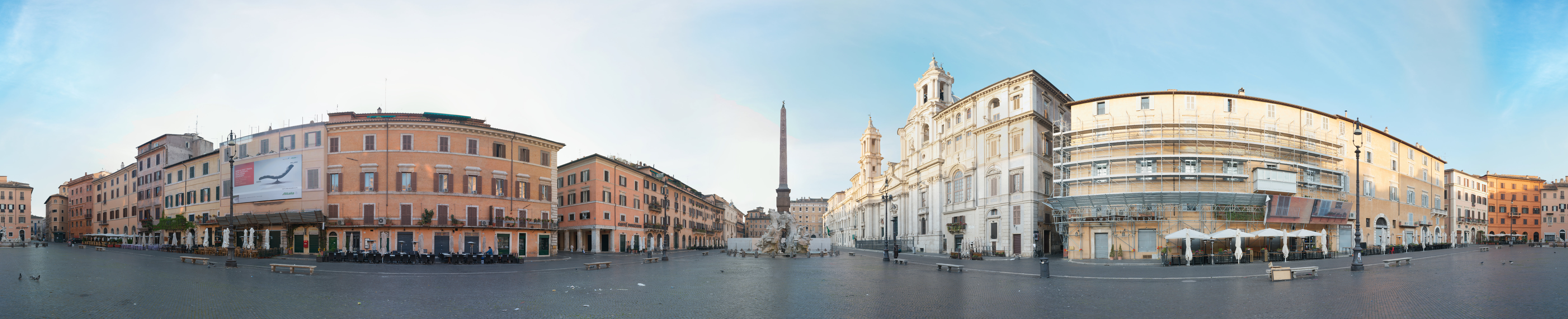
The city's spacious Piazza Navona

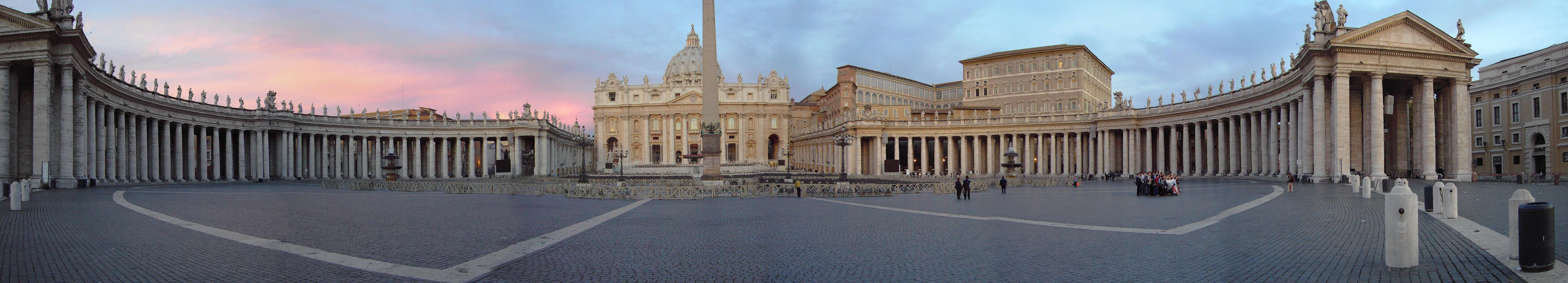
A view of St. Peter's Square

The Colosseum interior

=== Central Rome ===
Rome can be divided into several districts. The historical center (centro storico) is quite small, only around 4% of the city's area. This is mainly made up of Old Rome and Colosseum, as explained below:

- Modern Center—Where the hotels are, as well as shopping and dining along the Via Veneto; home to the Quirinale, Trevi Fountain, Barberini, Castro Pretorio, and Repubblica areas.
- Historic quarter—the center of the Roman medieval and Renaissance periods, with several piazzas, cathedrals, the Pantheon, and plenty of dining; includes the Navona, Campo de' Fiori, and the Jewish Ghetto neighborhoods
- The Vatican—the Papal City State and its sights, relics, and museums, as well as the surrounding Italian neighborhood, Vaticano
- Colosseum—the heart of ancient Rome, the Colosseum, the Roman Forum, the Forum of Augustus, the Forum and Markets of Trajan, the Capitoline and its museums
- North Centre—situated in the north part of Rome, home to the Villa Borghese, the Spanish Steps, and the upper-class neighborhoods of Parioli and Salario
- Trastevere—the land to the south of the Vatican, on the west bank of the Tiber River
- Aventino-Testaccio—there are several restaurants in the area.
- Esquilino-San Giovanni—south of Termini, with an indoor market, Piazza Vittorio Emanuele II, and the Cathedral of Rome Saint John in Lateran
- Nomentano—Municipio III, the neighborhoods "behind" the train station

=== Outskirts ===
- North—the vast suburban neighborhoods to the north of the center (Municipi 4, 15–20)
- South—home to extensive suburbs and fascist monumental architecture at EUR as well as catacombs, the Appian Way and its main site, the Appian Way Regional Park. (Municipi 5–13)
- Ostia—Rome's beach resort and the ruins of Ancient Rome's harbour (Ostia Antica).

== Tourism tax ==
Like other Italian and world cities, Rome charges a hotel tax. It ranges from €3 to €7 per person, per night, based on the hotel or other type of accommodation used (children under 10 years old are exempt, and the tax no longer applies after 10 days).

== Transport ==
=== Plane ===
Rome has two main international airports:

- Leonardo da Vinci/Fiumicino International Airport (Rome-Fiumicino) – Rome's main airport is modern and connected to the center of the city by public transportation.
- Ciampino International Airport (Rome-Ciampino) – Located to the southeast of the capital, this is the city's low-cost airline airport, serving Easyjet, Ryanair and Wizzair flights, among others (see List of low-cost airlines in Europe). This small airport is closer to the city center than Fiumicino but has no direct train connection.

==== Airport transportation ====
From Leonardo da Vinci/Fiumicino airport, there are two train lines; Leonardo Express trains and Metropolitan train and COTRAL/Schiaffini operates buses from both airports to the city.

Taxis in Rome are white.

=== Train ===
Rome's main railway station is Termini Station.

=== Car ===
The city is ringed by a motorway, the GRA.

=== Boat ===
Most cruise ships dock in Civitavecchia,

- Grimaldi Lines provides ferry service to/from Barcelona, Tunis, Toulon (France), Porto-Vecchio (Corsica).
- Moby provides service to/from Olbia, Sardinia.

=== Taxi ===
Taxis are the most expensive forms of travel in Rome. Roman taxis within the city walls run on meters.

Rome has several taxi cooperatives:

- La Capitale
- Roma Sud
- Cosmos

=== Public transport (ATAC) ===
Tickets for public transport must be bought before boarding (from a 'Tabacchi' or directly at the metro). Tickets for regular ATAC buses, Metro, and trams are the same fares and are compatible with each other. ATAC polices the buses, Metro, and trams for people riding without tickets. Tickets must be validated, on entering the Metro station or on boarding a bus.

==== Roma Pass ====
The cost of a Roma pass is 34 euros and entitles holders to free admission to the first two museums and/or archaeological sites visited, full access to the public transport system, reduced tickets and discounts for any other following museums and sites visited, as well as exhibitions, music events, theatrical and dance performances and all other tourist services. There is also a pass called OMNIA Vatican and Rome that includes the services provided by Roma Pass, free entry to Vatican Museums and Sistine Chapel, fast track entry to St Peter's Basilica and hop-on-hop-off bus tour for 3 days. It costs 95 euros for 3 days.

==== Bus ====
Rome has an extensive bus system, which largely coalesces around the major transportation hub of Termini Station. In the historic core of the city, bus routes are largely confined to the main boulevards which transect the medieval and ancient neighborhoods, where roads are far too narrow for buses to access.

==== Tram ====
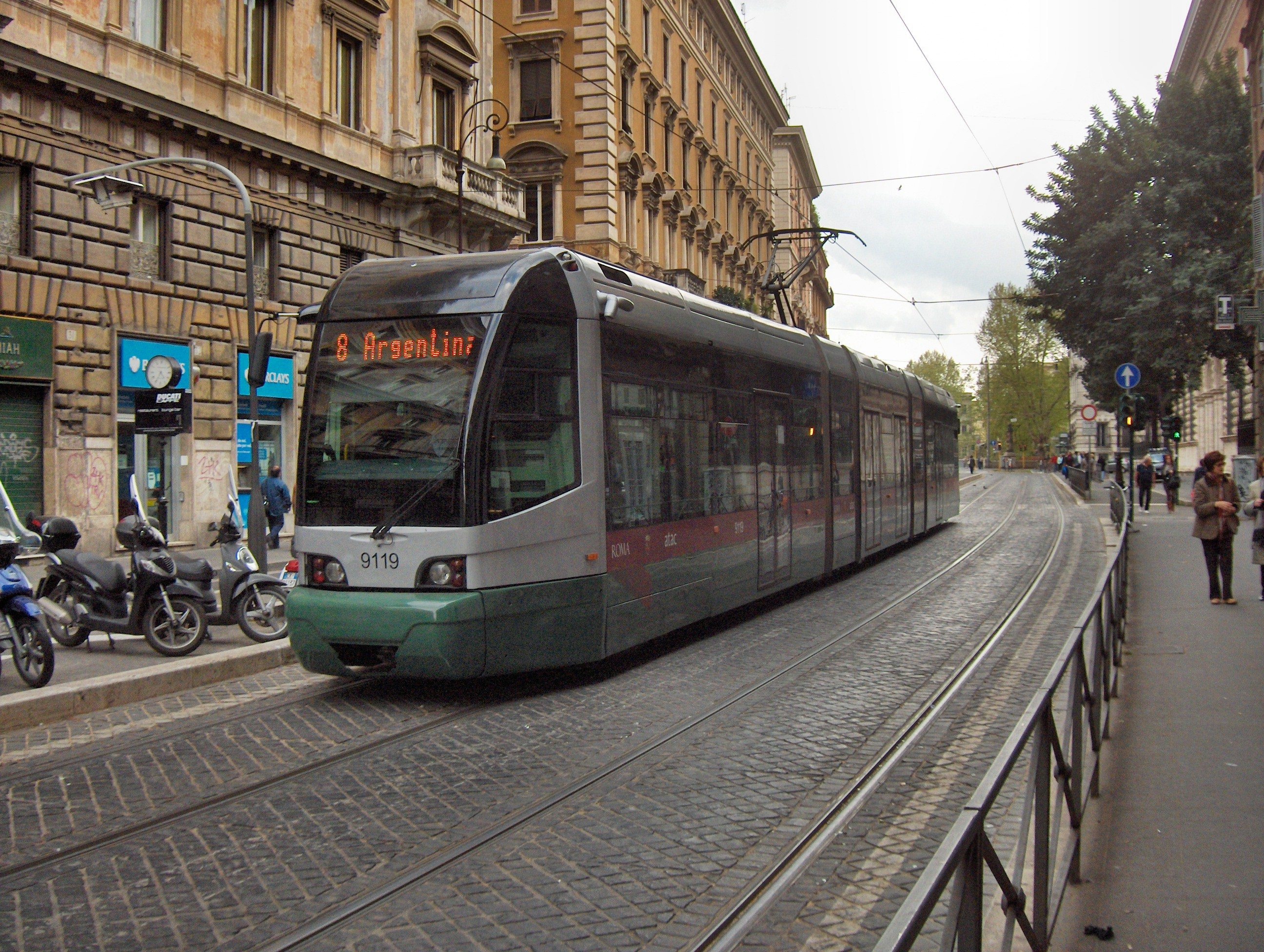
Rome tramway system

The tram routes mostly skirt the historic center, but there are stops near the Vatican, the Colosseum, and the Trastevere area.

==== Metro ====
Rome metro network

There are three lines. Line A (red line) runs northwest past the Vatican, and south. Line B (blue line) runs southwest past the Colosseum and northeast, and it center forks into line B1. Line C (green line) runs from the Saint John's Lateran Basilica in the center to the city limits far east.

=== Commuter rail ===
There is a network of suburban rail lines that mostly connect to smaller towns and conurbations of Rome.

The FL lines consist of 8 commuter rail lines operated by Trenitalia, converging on the city of Rome.

There are also 2 commuter rail lines operated by Astral and Cotral:

- Rome-Lido railway: is an urban railway line connecting Rome to Lido di Ostia, Rome's seaside neighborhood.
- Rome–Civita Castellana–Viterbo railway: is a regional railway line connecting Rome with Viterbo and various towns in the province of Viterbo.

== Bibliography (with license) ==
- This article includes text copied from Wikivoyage which is published under the CC-BY-SA 3.0 licence.
