= Acqua Acetosa railway station =

Railway station in Rome, Italy

Acqua Acetosa railway station Stazione ferroviaria dell'Acqua Acetosa
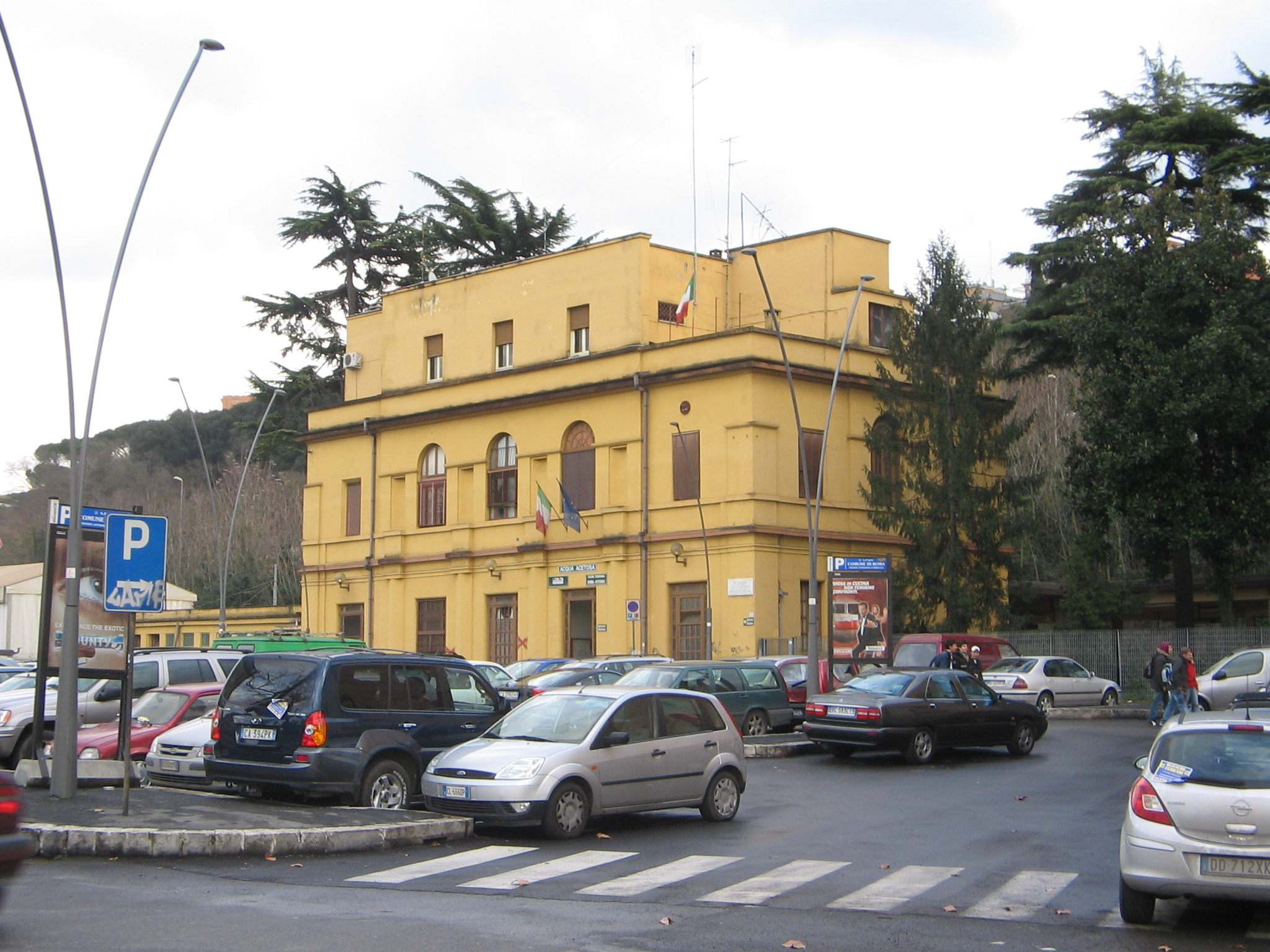

General information
- Location: Piazzale della Stazione dell'Acqua Acetosa, 00100 Rome; Parioli; Italy
- Coordinates: 41°55′54″N 12°29′14″E
- Tracks: 3 + 5 recoveries
- Connections: Buslines

History
- Opened: 28 October 1932

Services
Preceding station	Cotral	Following station
Euclide towards Piazzale Flaminio	Rome–Viterbo	Saxa Rubra (extra-urban) towards Viterbo
Euclide towards Piazzale Flaminio	Rome–Viterbo	Campi Sportivi (urban) towards Montebello
Location
- Click on the map for a fullscreen view

The Acqua Acetosa railway station is on the Rome–Civitacastellana–Viterbo railway. It is located in the urban section of Rome (Italy), in the quarter Parioli.

== History ==
The station was put into operation on October 28, 1932, as part of the railway line between Rome and Civita Castellana.

The area and the station are named after the source of Acqua Acetosa and the homonymous fountain.

In 2008-2009 the station underwent a renovation, during which the level of the platforms was raised.

== Services ==
The station has:

- Ticket machine

== Interchanges ==
- Bus stop

== See also ==
- Rome–Civitacastellana–Viterbo railway
