= Cimitero Flaminio =

Cemetery near Rome, Italy

Flaminio Cemetery
- Cimitero Flaminio
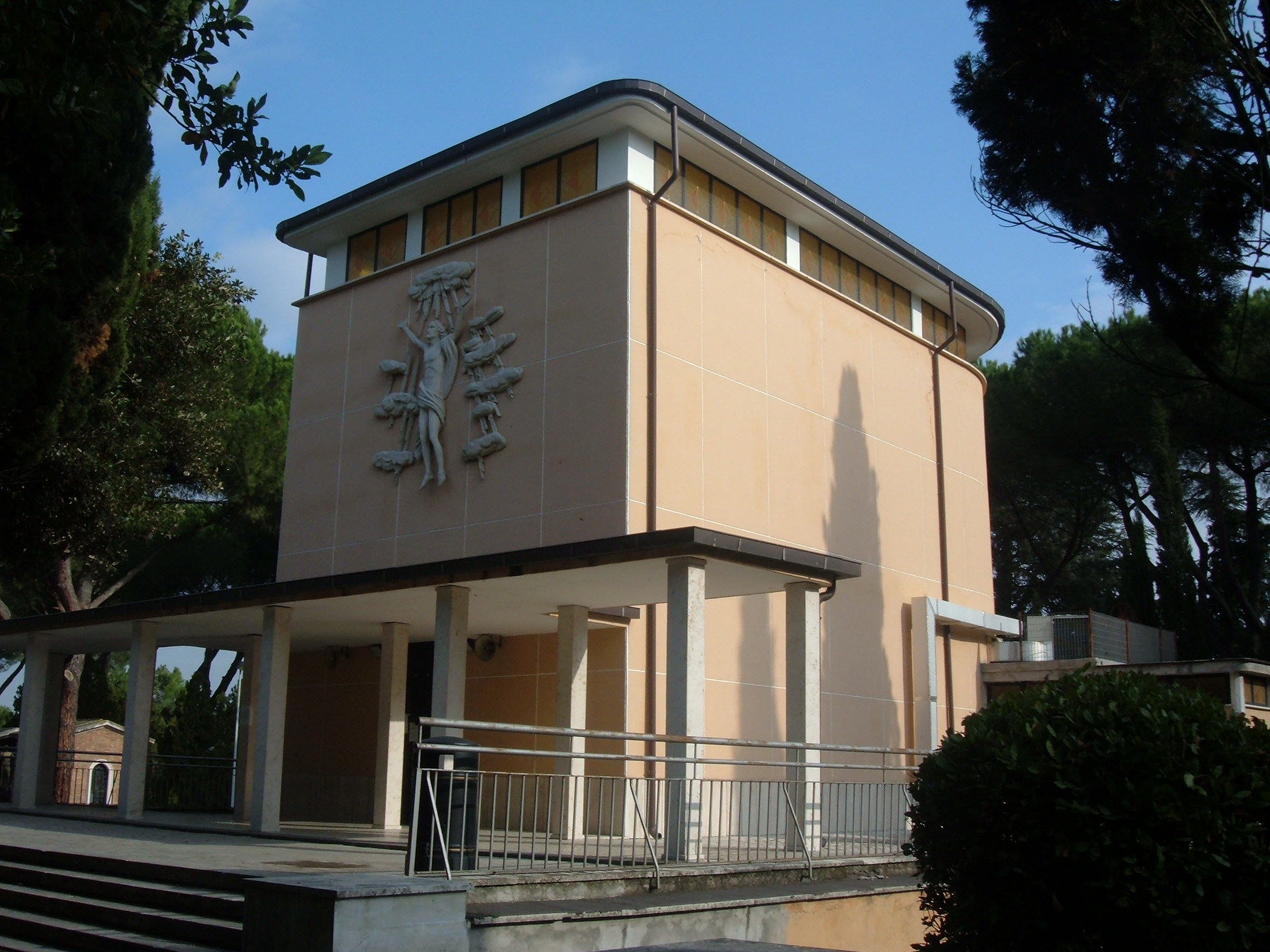
- San Michele Arcangelo al Flaminio
- Interactive map of Flaminio Cemetery

Details
- Established: 1945
- Location: Via Flaminia, Km 14,400, 00188 Rome
- Country: Italy
- Coordinates: 42.015°N 12.496°E
- Type: civilian cemetery
- Size: 140 ha
- Website: Official website
- Find a Grave: Flaminio Cemetery

The Cimitero Flaminio (also known as Cimitero di Prima Porta or Cimitero di Montebello) is a cemetery in Rome (Italy), outside the Grande Raccordo Anulare to the north, between the Via Flaminia and the Via Tiberina.

== History ==
The cemetery was established in 1945 on a project by the architect Elena Luzzatto.

== Description ==
With its extension of 140 hectares, it is the largest cemetery in Italy; it is crossed by 37 km of internal roads, on which vehicles and buses circulate.

The graves are mainly mound tombs; many of them are arranged into buildings or constructions which, due to their shape, are called "semicircular". There are some distinct departments for the different religious denominations, as well as numerous common fields and a crematorium.

It is considered a masterpiece of contemporary cemetery architecture. It houses the tombs of many famous personalities of Italian culture, art, entertainment, sport and politics of the last century.

Within the cemetery rises a church dedicated to Saint Michael the Archangel in Flaminio, a subsidiary place of worship of the parish of Santi Urbano e Lorenzo a Prima Porta.

== Famous people buried in the cemetery ==
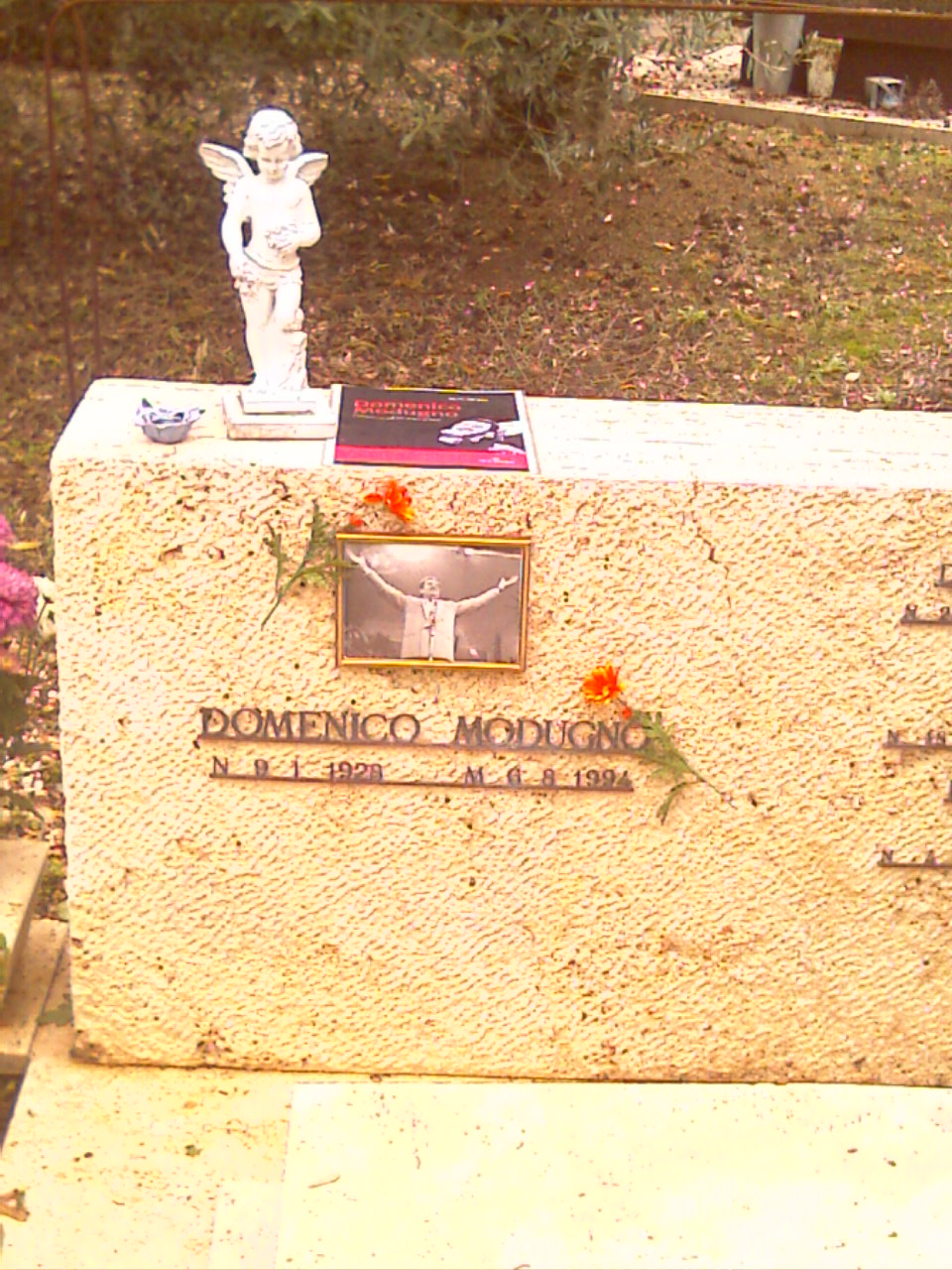
The grave of Domenico Modugno

- Mario Ageno (biophysicist)
- Gianni Agus (actor)
- Gilberto Agustoni (Catholic cardinal)
- Ilaria Alpi (journalist)
- Ennio Antonelli (actor)
- Maurizio Arena (actor)
- Enrico Berlinguer (politician)
- Angelo Bernabucci (actor)
- Fulvio Bernardini (footballer and coach)
- Francesca Bertini (actress)
- Bombolo (actor)
- Fred Bongusto (singer, songwriter and composer)
- Carla Boni (singer)
- Rossano Brazzi (actor)
- Gianni Brezza (dancer, choreographer, director and actor)
- Primo Brown (rapper)
- Flavio Bucci (actor, voice actor and film producer)
- Franco Caracciolo (conductor)
- Memmo Carotenuto (actor)
- Vincenzo Cerami (screenwriter, novelist and poet)
- Enzo Cerusico (actor)
- Gino Cervi (actor)
- Tonino Cervi (film director, screenwriter and producer)
- Feodor Chaliapin Jr. (actor)
- Giorgio Chinaglia (footballer)
- Eduardo Ciannelli (baritone and actor)
- Luigi Comencini (film director)
- Corrado (radio and television host)
- Vincenzo Crocitti (actor)
- Carlo Dapporto (actor)
- Gualtiero De Angelis (actor and voice actor)
- Luciana Dolliver (singer)
- Arturo Dominici (actor and voice actor)
- Elena Fabrizi (actress)
- Franca Faldini (writer, journalist and actress)
- Rossella Falk (actress)
- Amintore Fanfani (politician and statesman)
- Lucio Fulci (film director and actor) (remains later transferred to Cimitero Laurentino)
- Luigi Gatti (actor)
- Giuliano Gemma (actor)
- Ileana Ghione (actress)
- Aldo Giuffrè (actor)
- Carlo Giuffrè (actor)
- Ninì Gordini Cervi (actress)
- Sylva Koscina (actress)
- Francesca Lancellotti (venerable layperson) (moved to Santa Maria ai Monti in 2021)
- Virna Lisi (actress)
- Carlo Lizzani (film director, screenwriter and critic)
- Roldano Lupi (actor)
- Tommaso Maestrelli (footballer and manager)
- Pupella Maggio (actress)
- Luigi Magni (screenwriter and film director)
- Riccardo Mantoni (director, voice actor and television author)
- Giovanni Manurita (tenor and actor)
- Marcello Martana (actor)
- Myroslav Marusyn (Greek Catholic archbishop)
- Gilberto Mazzi (singer and actor)
- Pietro Mennea (sprinter and politician)
- Achille Millo (actor and stage director)
- Fedora Mingarelli (singer)
- Isa Miranda (actress)
- Domenico Modugno (singer, songwriter, actor, guitarist and politician)
- Benjamin Murmelstein (rabbi)
- Ferdinando Natoni (military, Righteous Among the Nations)
- Joaquín Navarro-Valls (journalist, physician and academic, from 1984 to 2007 spokesperson for the Holy See)
- Umberto Nobile (aviator, aeronautical engineer and Arctic explorer)
- Marina Pagano (singer and actress)
- Silvana Pampanini (actress, director and singer)
- Paolo Panelli (comedian and actor)
- Sandro Penna (poet)
- Alberto Rabagliati (singer)
- Renato Rascel (actor, singer and songwriter)
- Nora Ricci (actress)
- Luciano Rossi (actor)
- Nini Rosso (jazz trumpeter and composer)
- Nunzio Rotondo (jazz trumpeter and bandleader)
- Stefania Rotolo (singer, television presenter and dancer)
- Gigi Sabani (impersonator and singer)
- Irina Sanpiter (actress)
- Lydia Simoneschi (actress and voice actress)
- Alberto Sorrentino (actor)
- Steno (film director, screenwriter and cinematographer)
- Aroldo Tieri (actor)
- Vieri Tosatti (composer)
- Bice Valori (actress and comedian)
- Carlo Vanzina (film director, producer and screenwriter)
- Fernando Viola (footballer)
- Natasha Sophia Simpson (11 year old U.S Citizen killed in the December 27th, 1985 Rome Airport Terrorist Attacks)

== Transport ==
- Montebello (ATAC)

== See also ==
- Prima Porta
