= Lepanto (Rome Metro) =

Rome metro station

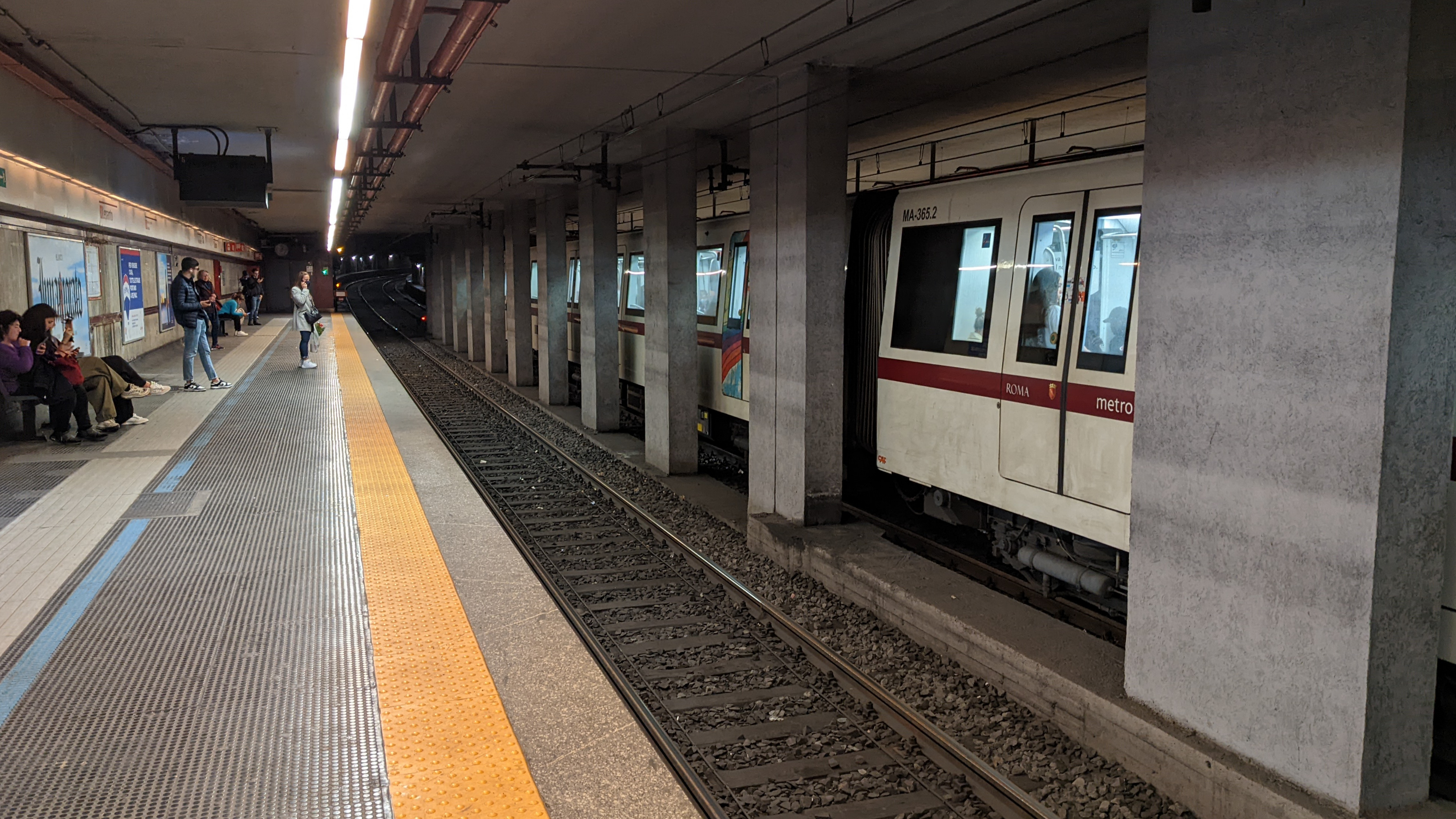
- MA300 train at the station

General information
- Coordinates: 41°54′41″N 12°27′58″E
- Owner: ATAC
- Platforms: 2 side platforms
- Tracks: 2

Construction
- Structure type: Underground

History
- Opened: 1980; 46 years ago

Services
Preceding station	Rome Metro	Following station
Ottaviano towards Battistini	Line A	Flaminio towards Anagnina
Location
- Click on the map to see marker

Lepanto is an underground station on Line A of the Rome Metro. The station was inaugurated in 1980, and is at the junction of Viale Giulio Cesare with Via Lepanto and Via Marcantonio Colonna, in Prati.

The offices of the Civil Court of Rome are in Via Lepanto.

== Facilities ==
This station has:

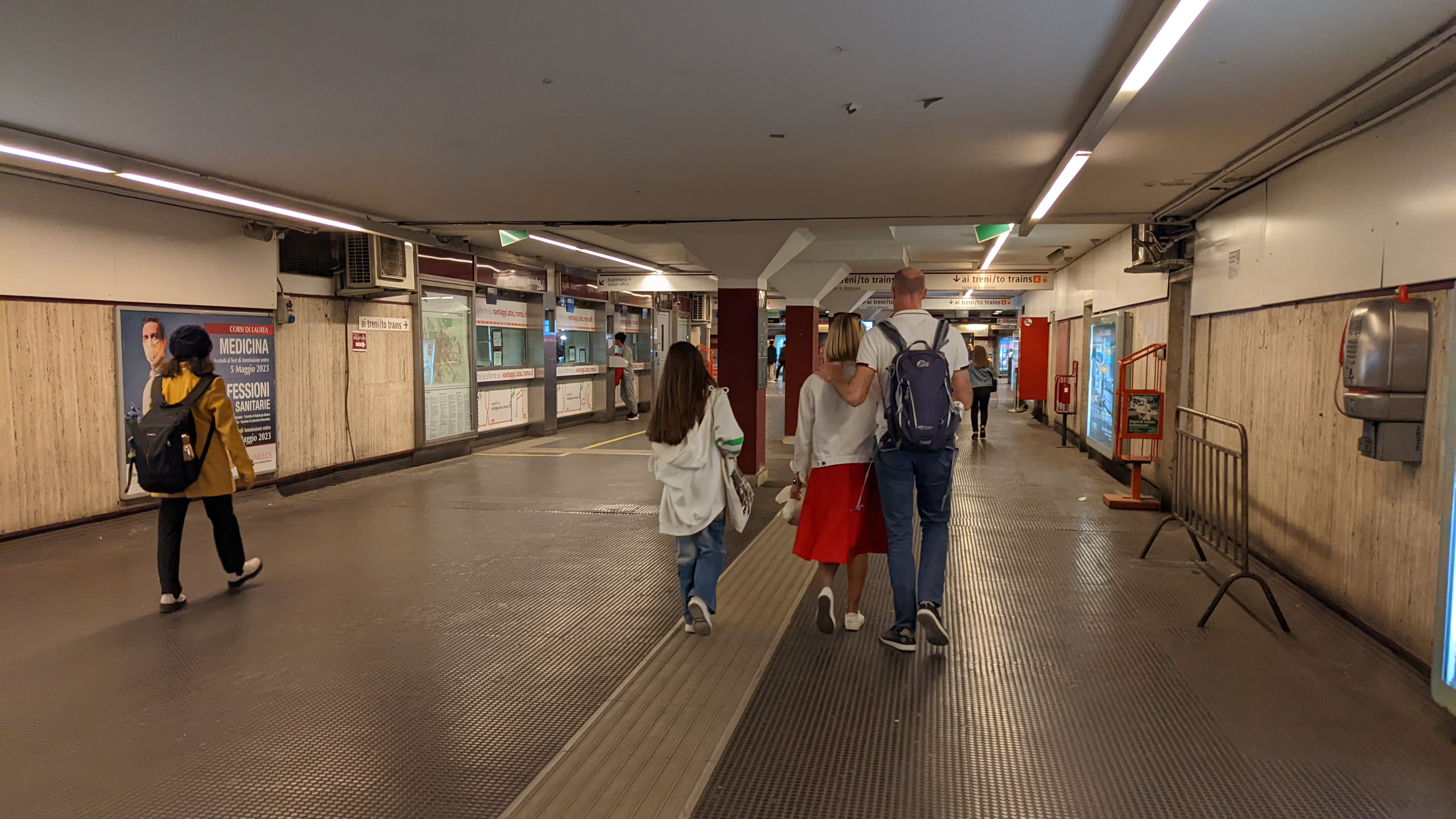
Ticket hall

- Ticket office

== Located nearby ==
- Rione Prati
  - Piazza Cavour
  - Piazza Cola di Rienzo
  - Piazza dei Quiriti
  - Teatro Adriano
  - Palazzo di Giustizia
- quartiere Della Vittoria
  - Palazzo RAI di viale Mazzini
  - Chiesa di Cristo Re
  - Museo del Mamiani

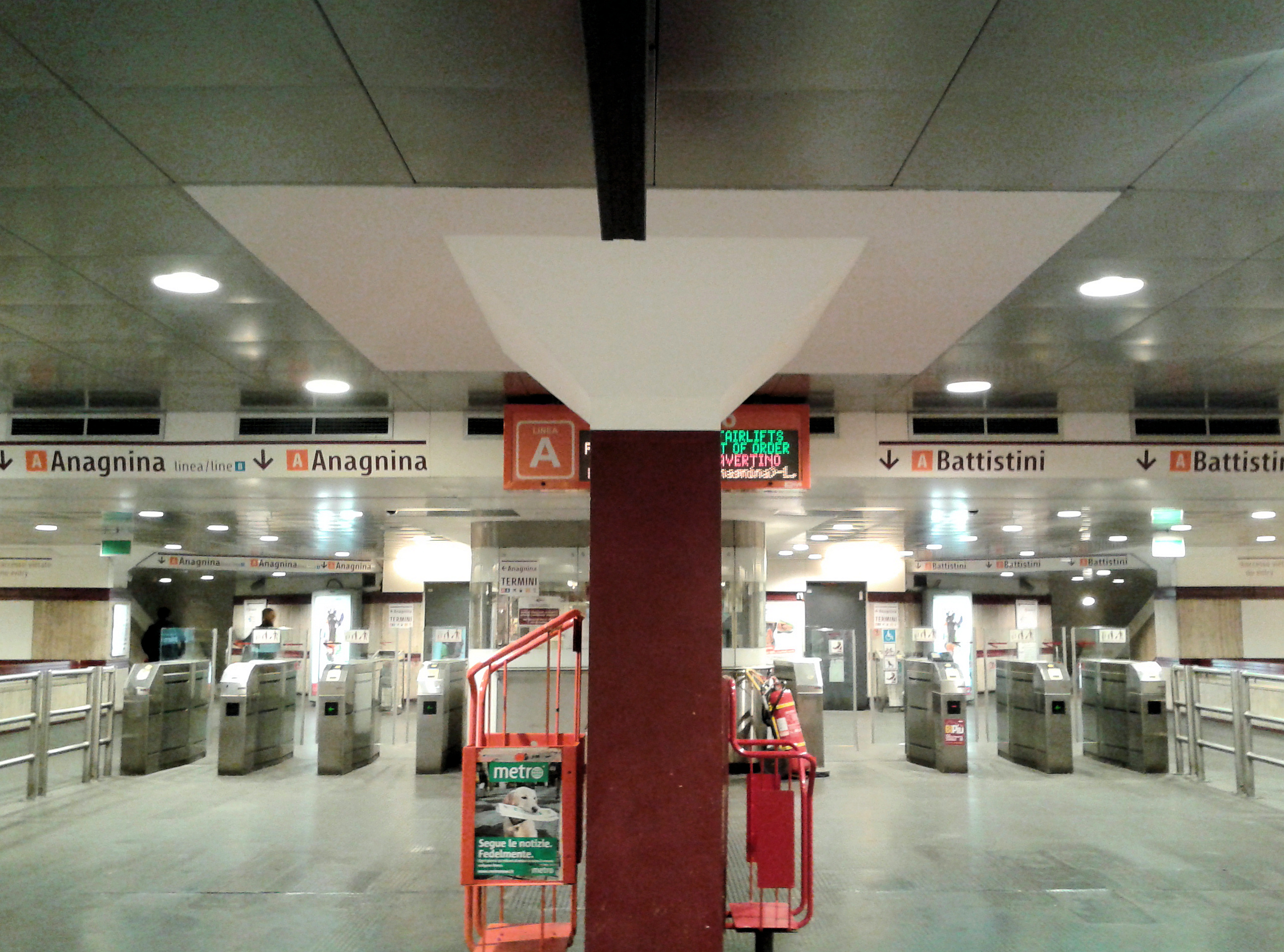
Station atrium

The station is said to be for Vatican City on system maps - however Ottaviano, the next station, is closer.
