= Piazzale Flaminio railway station =

Railway station in Rome, Italy

Piazzale Flaminio railway station Stazione ferroviaria di Piazzale Flaminio
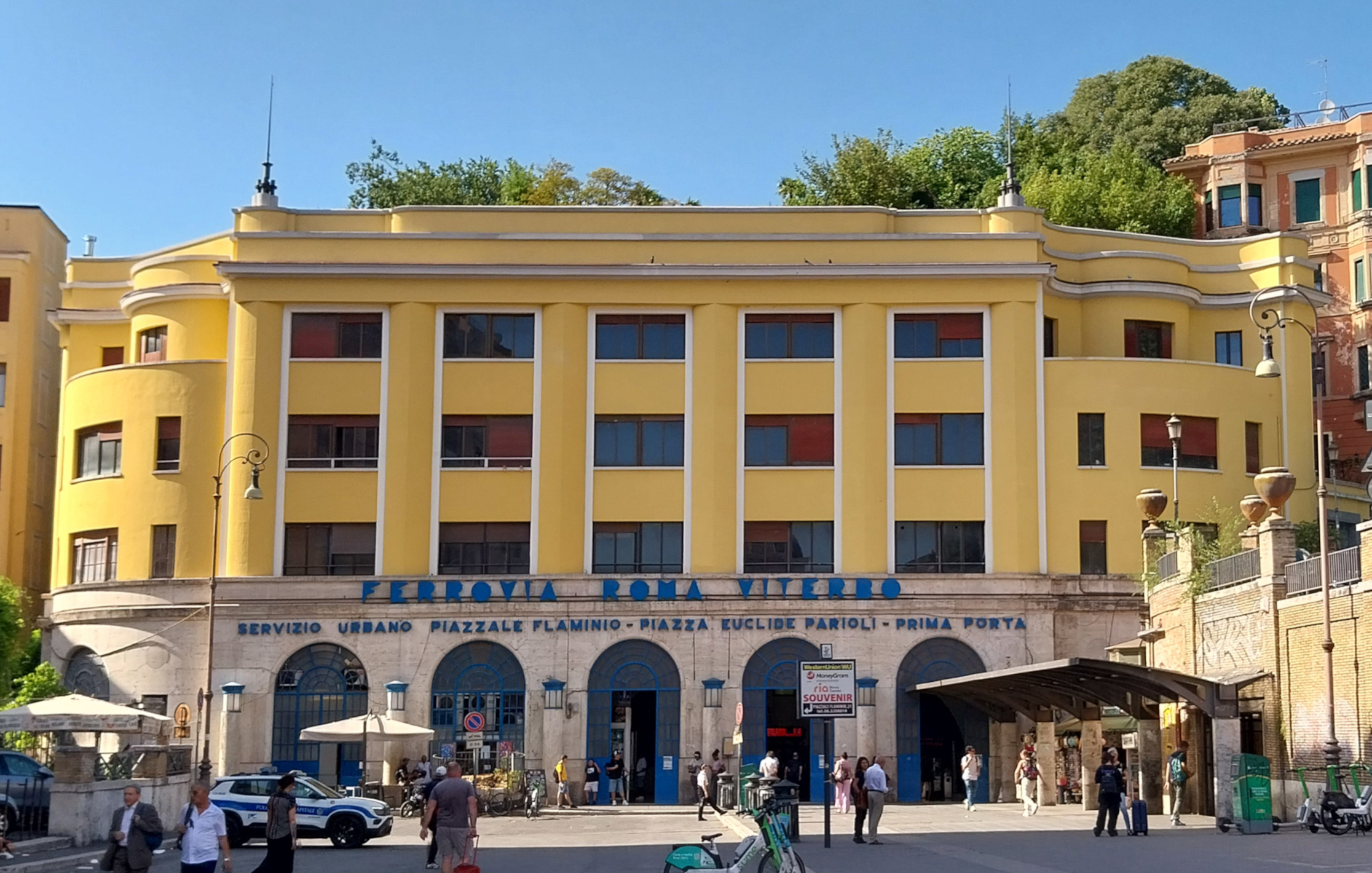

General information
- Location: Piazzale Flaminio, 00196 Rome; Italy
- Coordinates: 41°54′46″N 12°28′35″E
- Operator: ASTRAL/Cotral
- Tracks: 2

History
- Opened: January 15, 1958

Services
Preceding station	Cotral	Following station
Terminus	Rome–Viterbo	Euclide (extra-urban) towards Viterbo
Terminus	Rome–Viterbo	Euclide (urban) towards Montebello
Location
- Click on the map for a fullscreen view

The Piazzale Flaminio railway station is a railway station in Rome (Italy) and the terminus of the Rome–Civitacastellana–Viterbo railway, managed by ASTRAL (Lazio).

== History ==
The station was inaugurated on October 28, 1932 (the tenth anniversary of the March on Rome) together with the Rome – Civita Castellana line; the last urban section was built in a tunnel under the quarter Parioli.

== Description ==
The station is on the ground floor of a three-story building designed by the architect Ariodante Bassero. It has an underground hall about 100 meters long, with tracks on either side and a central sidewalk. In a room adjacent to the ticket office there is a fresco representing all the towns reached by the railway.

In addition to the suburban trains bound for Civita Castellana and Viterbo, urban trains also depart from the station, which terminate at the Montebello station.

== Interchanges ==
- Metro stop (Flaminio – Piazza del Popolo, line A)
- Tram stop (Flaminio, line 2)
- Bus stop (ATAC and Cotral lines)
