= Flaminio – Piazza del Popolo (Rome Metro) =

Rome metro station

Flaminio Piazza del Popolo
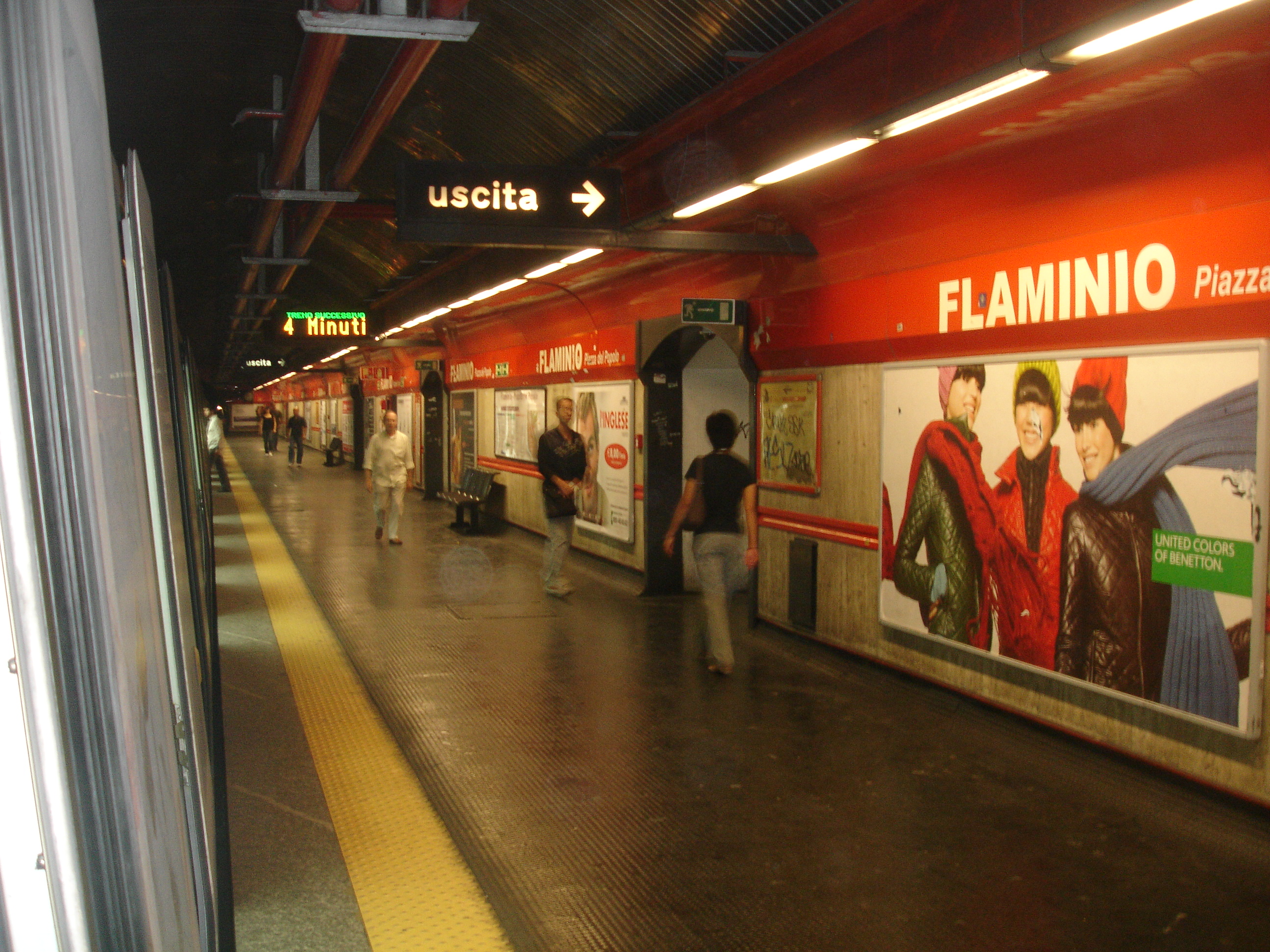

General information
- Coordinates: 41°54′43″N 12°28′33″E
- Owner: ATAC
- Tracks: 2

Construction
- Structure type: Underground

History
- Opened: 1980; 46 years ago

Services
Preceding station	Rome Metro	Following station
Lepanto towards Battistini	Line A	Spagna towards Anagnina
Location
- Click on the map to see marker

Flaminio–Piazza del Popolo is an underground station on Line A of the Rome Metro, inaugurated in 1980. The station is situated on the large Piazzale Flaminio, in the Flaminio quarter outside the Aurelian Walls, next to Piazza del Popolo, and is near the Campus Martius.

A tram (line 2) connects the Piazzale Flaminio to the Stadio Flaminio, the Auditorium at the Parco della Musica, the Palazzetto of the Sport and the Stadio Olimpico.

The entrance hall of the station accommodates some mosaics of the Rome Artemetro Prize, created by Paul D' Orazio and Lee Doo Shik.

Flaminio is also the Rome terminus of the Rome–Civitacastellana–Viterbo railway, on which suburban services run through the Rome outskirts to Viterbo.

== Services ==
This station has:

- Escalators (underground)
- Ticket office (mainline)

== Connecting Services ==
- Line A
- Roma-Viterbo

== Located Nearby ==
- Villa Borghese
- Piazza del Popolo
- Porta del Popolo
- Santa Maria del Popolo
- Pincio
- Via del Corso
- Via del Babuino
- Via Margutta
- Via di Ripetta, including the Palazzo Ripetta, now a hotel
- Restaurants, including Café Rosati and Babington's Tea Rooms
