= Fontana dell'Acqua Acetosa (Rome) =

Fountain of Acqua Acetosa
- Fontana dell'Acqua Acetosa (Italian)
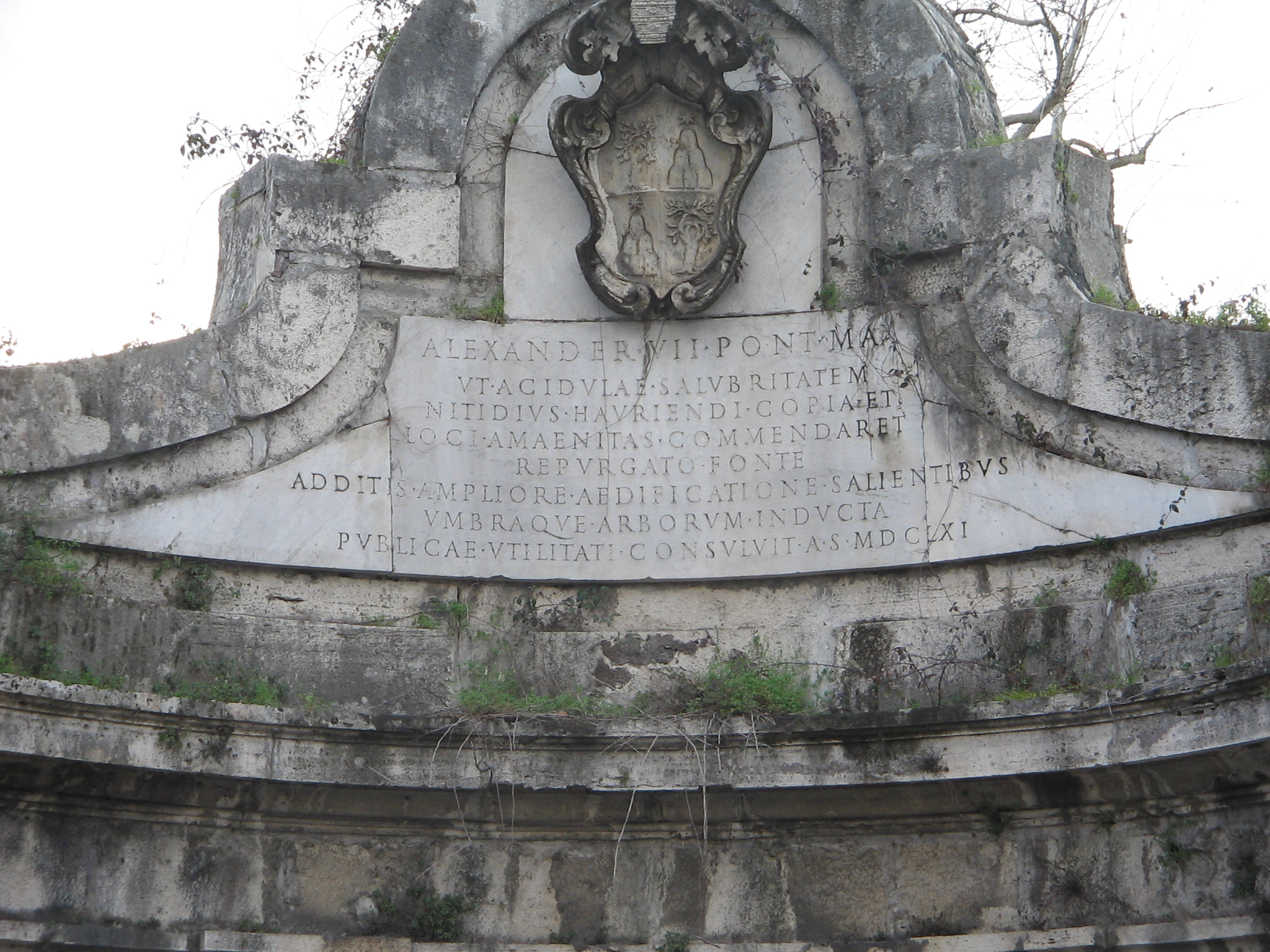
- Click on the map for a fullscreen view
- Artist: Andrea Sacchi or Marco Antonio De' Rossi
- Year: 1661
- Type: Public fountain
- Medium: Stone
- Location: Parioli, Rome, Italy; 41°55′53″N 12°29′8″E

Renibus et stomacho, spleni corique medetur
Mille malis prodest ista salubris aqua.

This healthy water is medicine for the kidneys, the stomach, the spleen and the heart
and is useful for a thousand diseases.

— from the dedicatory epigraph of Paul V

The Fontana dell'Acqua Acetosa is a fountain in Rome (Italy), located in the flat area with the same name, in the quarter Parioli; at this point the river Tiber forms a deep bend before heading north again. The fountain rises at a lower elevation than the street level, and is therefore accessed via a staircase. In 2003 the Fondo Ambiente Italiano, on the basis of a popular survey, identified it as the monument to which Italians are fondest of.

== History ==
The name derives from the source of ferruginous water, known to the Romans of the 16th century as acqua acetosa (Italian for "vinegary water"; not to be confused with the more famous one in Fonte Ostiense), which flowed here. In 1613 Pope Paul V had it analyzed, and it turned out that it was not only drinkable, but also curative for diseases of the kidneys, stomach, spleen and liver, to the point that someone collected it in bottles to sell it in the city.

The water was particularly appreciated by Pope Paul V, who commissioned the architect Giovanni Vasanzio a fountain in 1619, as the plaque on a lower wall still reminds; at the time, the source was a simple wall from which water gushed. The fountain was restored by Innocent X.

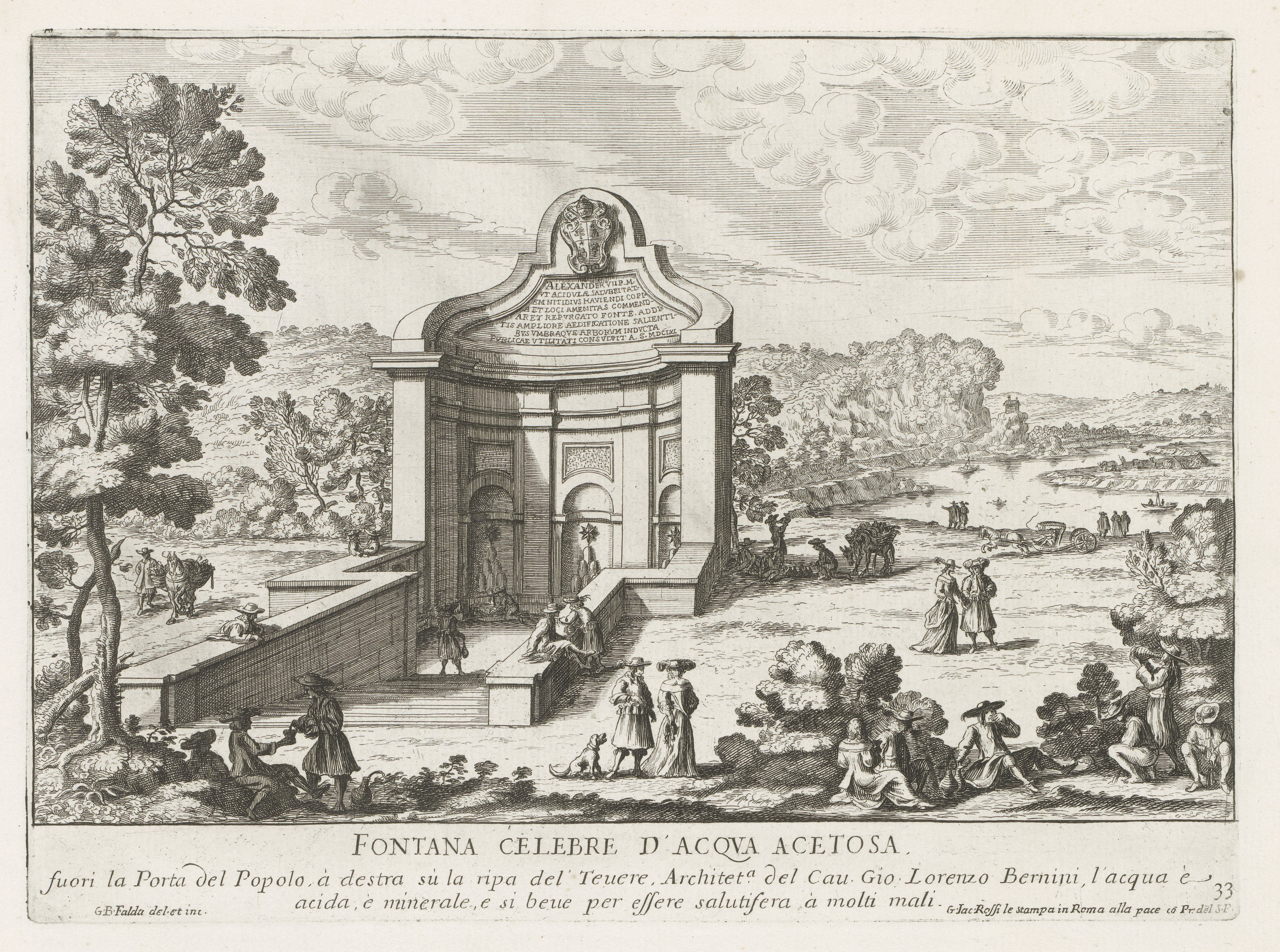
Fontana celebre d'Acqua Acetosa, engraving by Giovanni Battista Falda (second half of the 17th century).

It was Pope Alexander VII who commissioned the current fountain: at the top there is a tympanum with the papal coat of arms and a plaque. The fountain has a staircase leading downwards, where there is an exedra-shaped façade. The façade has three niches, each of which shows the coat of arms of the Chigi family – six mountains dominated by an eight-pointed star – above a small tank fed by a pipe. The attribution to Gian Lorenzo Bernini is probably untrue: it is supposed that the projects are by Andrea Sacchi or by the architect Marco Antonio De 'Rossi.

In 1712 there was a new restoration, commissioned by Pope Clement XI and commemorated by another plaque placed in a lower position, above the central niche. There had been protests for the lower water flow of the fountain, which created long queues, and for the quality of the water that had deteriorated. The pontiff appointed a commission which included Giovanni Maria Lancisi, pontifical doctor, and the architect Egidio Maria Bordoni; the commission was chaired by the Cardinal Giovanbattista Spinola, who was also a Camerlengo at the time. The work solved the problems contested by the local population.

The stone seats were installed in 1821, thanks to a funding from Ludwig I of Bavaria, a frequent visitor to the area during his Roman stay (it was here that he met his lover Maria Anna Florenzi).

Due to the pollution of the aquifer, the fountain was closed in 1959 and later reopened by feeding it with normal drinking water from water mains. Still at the beginning of the 20th century, the street vendors called acquacetosari sold the water from this source around the city; the first mention on this particular profession is reported by Papi in the De agricoltura (1663).

Between 2008 and 2009 the fountain has been subjected to an important renovation work, which also included the creation of a small fenced park, with the aim of restoring to the area its original setting.

== Transports ==
It can be reached from the Acqua Acetosa station.

== Bibliography ==
- Willy Pocino, Le curiosità di Roma, Rome, Newton & Compton, 2009. ISBN 978-88-541-1505-7
- Claudio Rendina, I quartieri di Roma, Rome, Newton & Compton, 2006. ISBN 9788854105942
- La fontana dell'Acqua Acetosa a Roma. La storia, il restauro e il nuovo parco, edited by Luisa Cardilli and Marcello Fagiolo, Milan, Silvana Editoriale, 2010
- Willy Pocino, Le fontane di Roma, Rome, Newton & Compton, 2004. ISBN 88-541-0204-0
