= Piazzale Flaminio =

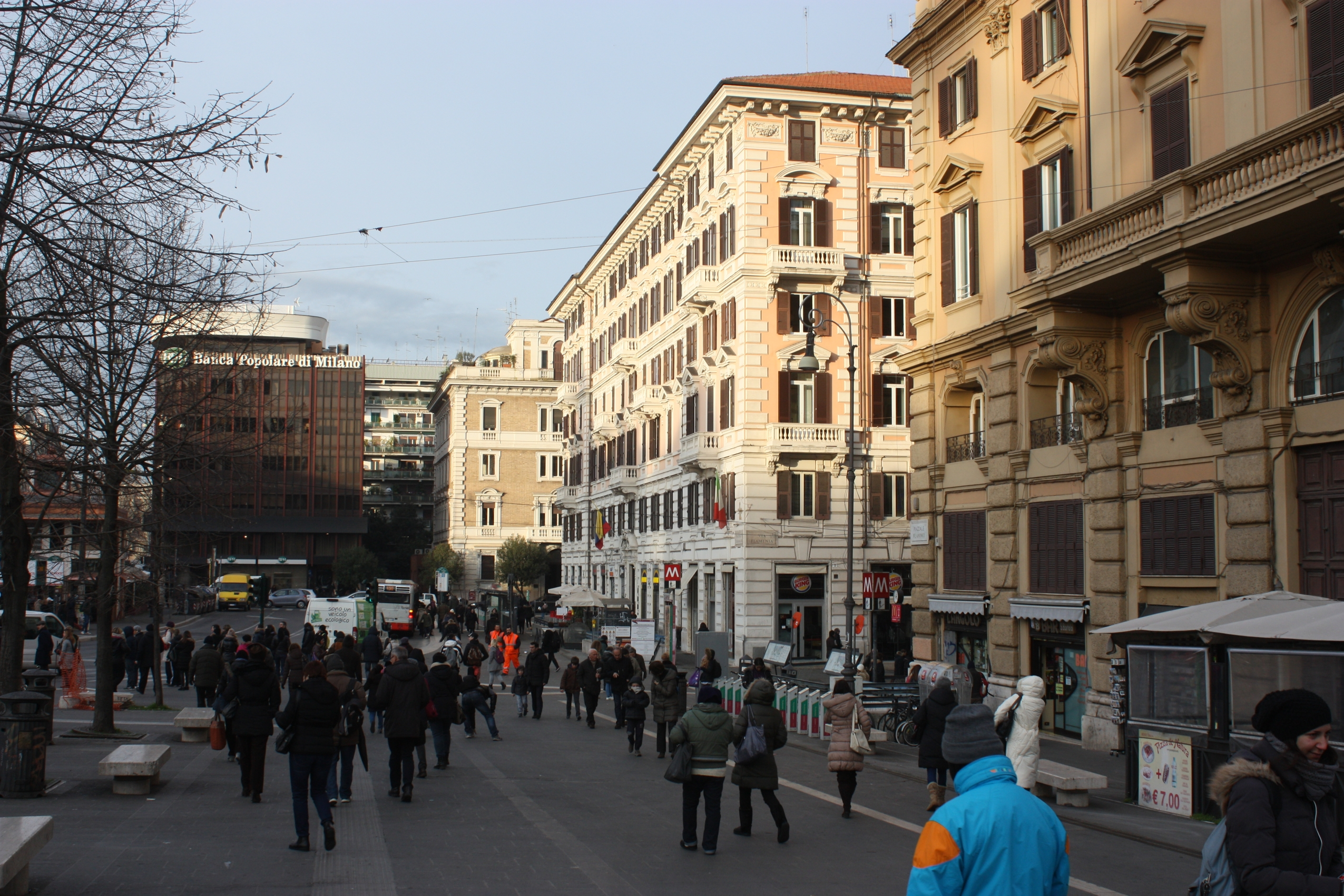
- View of the square in 2015
- Interactive map of Piazzale Flaminio
- Location: Rome, Italy
- Postal code: 00196
- Coordinates: 41°54′42″N 12°28′34″E
- North: Via Flaminia, Via Giambattista Vico
- East: Viale del Muro Torto
- South: Piazza del Popolo
- West: Via Luisa di Savoia

Piazzale Flaminio is a square in Rome (Italy) and the starting point of the Via Flaminia.

It divides the Flaminio and the Pinciano quarters.

== Description ==
The square extends just outside the Aurelian Walls. Porta del Popolo, on its south side, connects it to Piazza del Popolo. On its east side there are the neoclassical propylaea giving access to Villa Borghese, designed by Luigi Canina.

In the 1990s, Piazzale Flaminio was the centre for Italian hip-hop and rap music.

The contemporary museum of art and architecture, MAXXI, is close to the square.

== Transportation ==
- Bus stop (ATAC)
- Metro stop (Flaminio - Piazza del Popolo, line A)
- Railway station (Piazzale Flaminio station)

== Image gallery ==
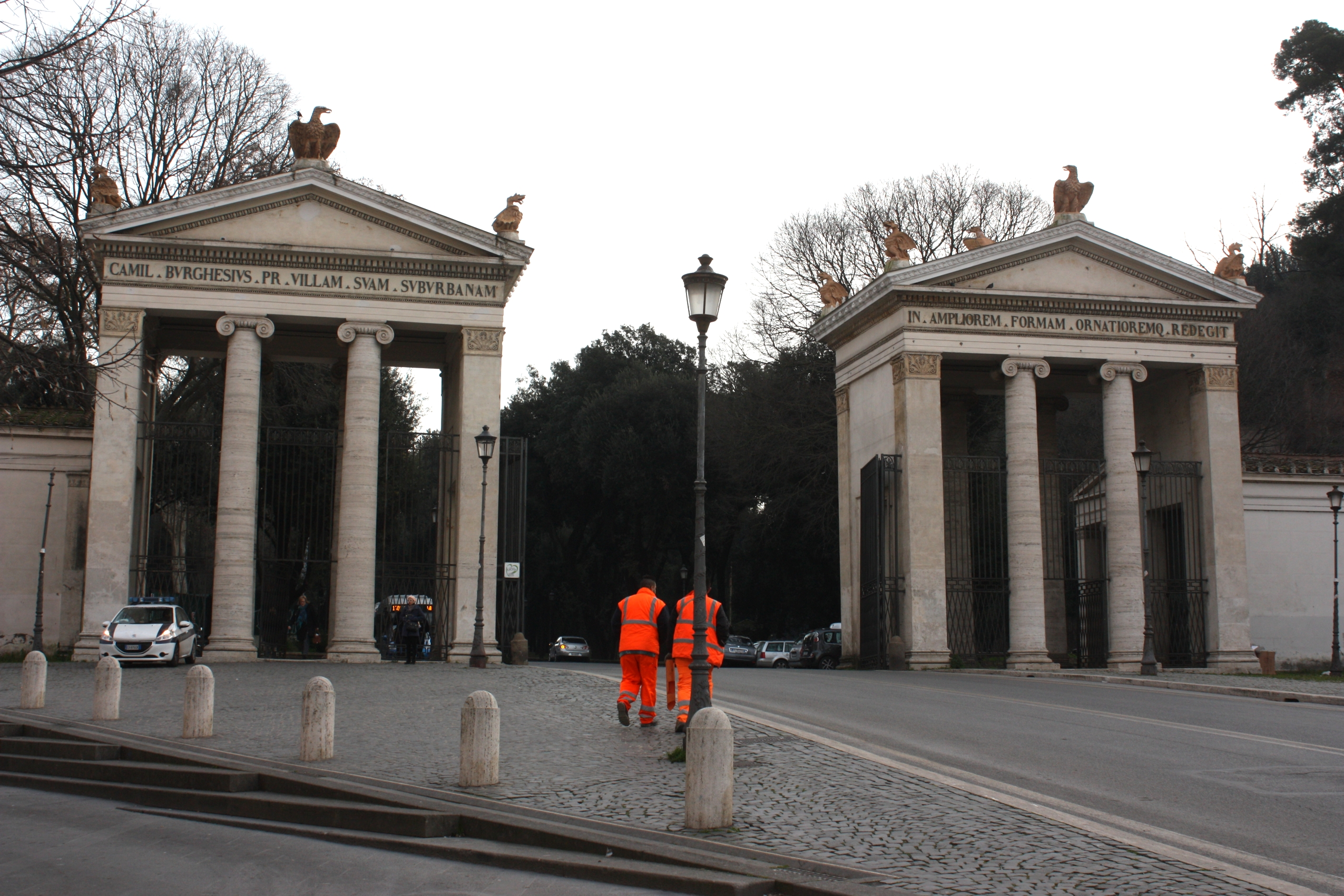
The propylaea of Villa Borghese

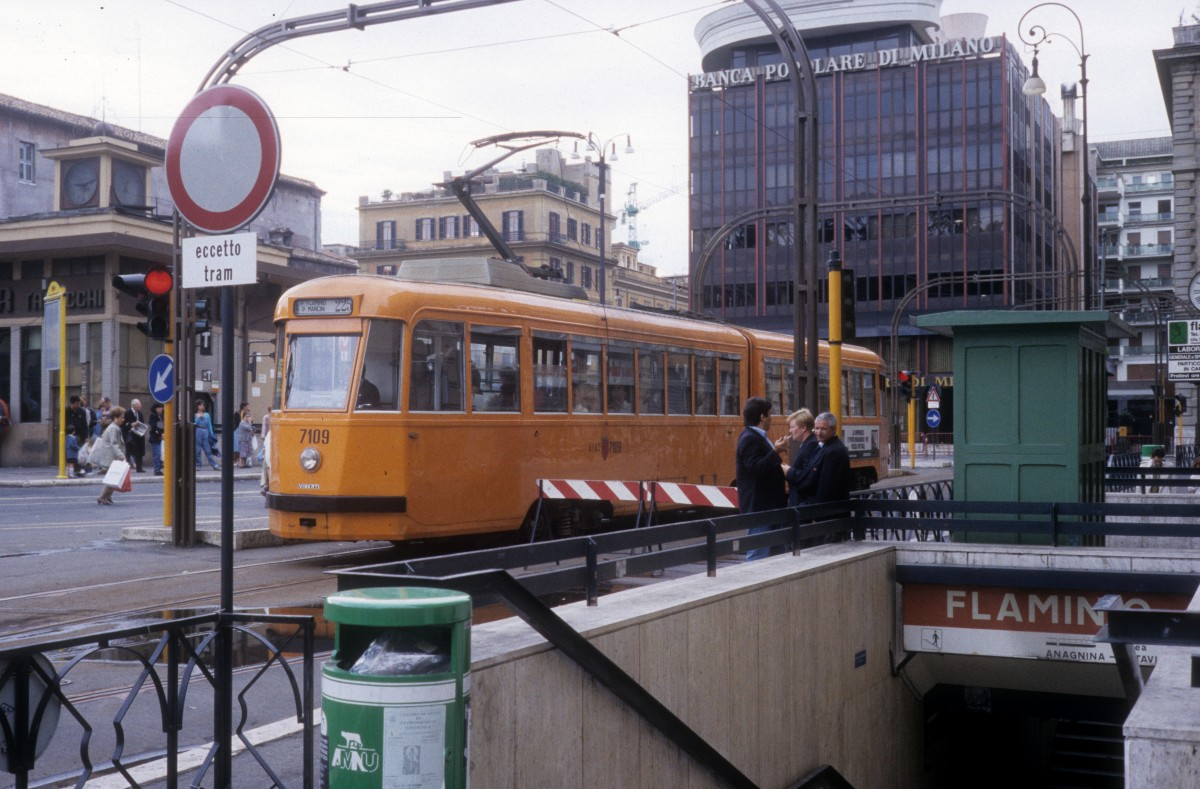
The access to the metro stop
