= Irina Sanpiter =

- Born: 27 September 1957; Moscow, Soviet Union
- Died: 4 February 2018 (aged 60); Rome, Italy
- Occupation: Actress

Irina Sanpiter (27 September 1957 – 4 February 2018) was a Soviet / Russian actress.

== Biography ==
Sanpiter was born on 27 September 1957 in Moscow, USSR. She studied recitation and political sciences, eventually graduating in the latter field. Se began her career as an actress in theater before transitioning to cinema, participating in several feature films. In 1980, she arrived in Italy at the invitation of Giorgio Arlorio. That same year, she had an uncredited role in a film by Ettore Scola. The following year, she auditioned for the production of the film Bianco, rosso e Verdone and was unexpectedly cast in the role of Magda, the wife of Furio, played by the film's director Carlo Verdone. This role brought her fame in Italy. For the film, Sanpiter’s voice was dubbed with a strong Turin accent by Solvejg D'Assunta. That same year, she also played the role of Amalia in Lacrime napulitane by Ciro Ippolito.

In 1984, after noticing swelling in her neck, Sanpiter was diagnosed with lymphoma. This illness forced her to abandon her film career due to the debilitating treatments and frequent blood transfusions she required. She later pursued a career as a singer, an activity she discontinued in the 1990s after marrying promoter Toni Evangelisti. Together, they worked as concert organizers.

Sanpiter was hospitalized at the Policlinico Umberto I in Rome, Italy. On February 4, 2018, she died after battling lymphoma for nearly 34 years.

== Filmography ==
- Za tvoju sud'bu, by Timur Zoloev (1973)
- Každyj den' žizni, by Timur Zoloev (1974)
- Zasekrečennyj gorod, by Michail Juzovskij (1974)
- Utro, by Valeriu Jereghi (cortometraggio, 1975)
- Bezotvetnaja ljubov', by Andrej Maljukov (1979)
- Mani di velluto (1979)
- Atterraggio zero, by Aleksandr Mitta (1980)
- Febbre a 40!, by Marius Mattei (1980, come Irina Saint Peter)
- La terrazza, by Ettore Scola (1980, not credited)
- Bianco, rosso e Verdone, by Carlo Verdone (1981)
- Lacrime napulitane, by Ciro Ippolito (1981)
