= Montebello railway station =

Railway station in Rome, Italy

Montebello
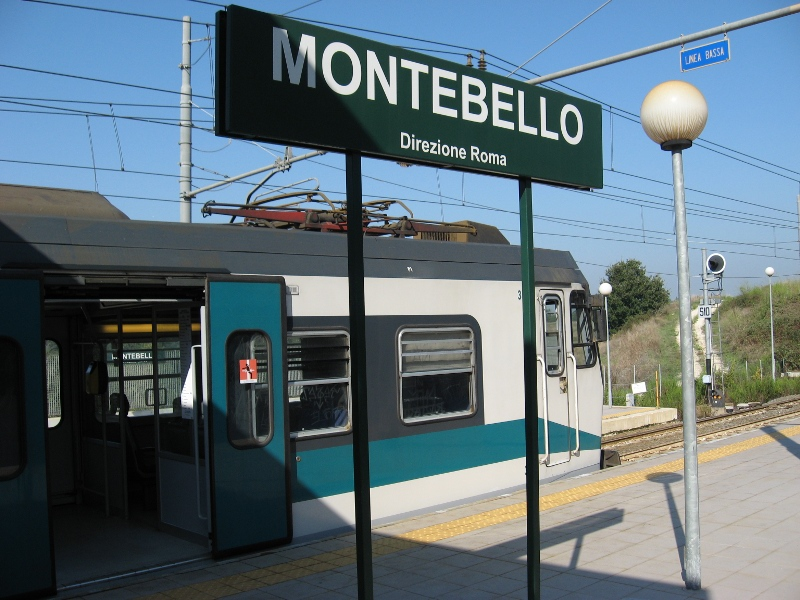

General information
- Location: 00188 Rome; Prima Porta; Italy
- Coordinates: 42°00′40″N 12°29′20″E
- Tracks: 3

History
- Opened: February 13, 2006

Services
Preceding station	Cotral	Following station
Saxa Rubra (extra-urban) towards Piazzale Flaminio	Rome–Viterbo	Sacrofano (extra-urban) towards Viterbo
La Giustiniana (urban) towards Piazzale Flaminio	Rome–Viterbo	Terminus
Location
- Click on the map for a fullscreen view

The Montebello railway station is a railway station on the Rome–Civitacastellana–Viterbo railway, located in Rome (Italy), outside the Grande Raccordo Anulare, in the zone Prima Porta (Z. LVIII).

== History ==
The station came into operation on February 13, 2006 as a terminus of the urban railway service as well as an interchange with vehicles on wheels.

== Description ==
The station consists of 3 tracks:

- tracks 1 and 2, with boarding-level platforms, for urban trains to and from Piazzale Flaminio which terminate in Montebello.
- track 3 for suburban trains.

== Services ==
The station has:

- Ticket office
- Pay park-and-ride with 352 parking places (of which 8 reserved for the disabled)

=== Interchanges ===
- Terminal of ATAC bus lines
- Weekdays and holidays: C1
- Saturdays and holidays only: C5

== Surroundings ==
- Cimitero Flaminio (also known as Cimitero di Montebello or Cimitero di Prima Porta).
