= Cotral =

Italian public transport services company

Compagnia Trasporti Laziali

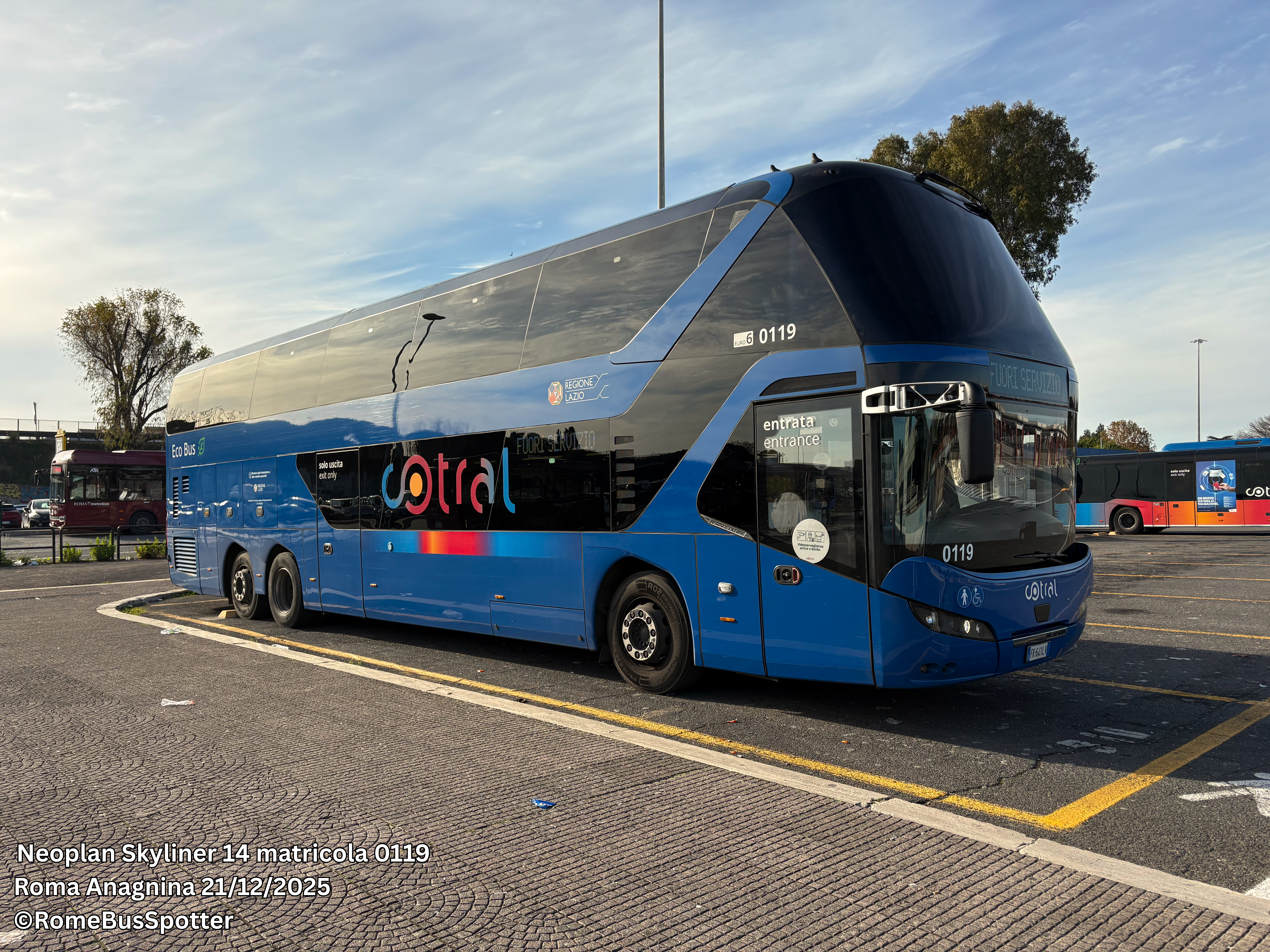
- Abbreviation: Cotral
- Formation: 1976 (previously STEFER in 1899)
- Type: Società per azioni
- Purpose: Public transport
- Headquarters: Rome
- Location: Rome
- Region served: Lazio
- President: Manolo Cipolla
- Parent organization: Regione Lazio
- Affiliations: UITP
- Website: Cotral S.p.A.
- Formerly called: STEFER, ACOTRAL

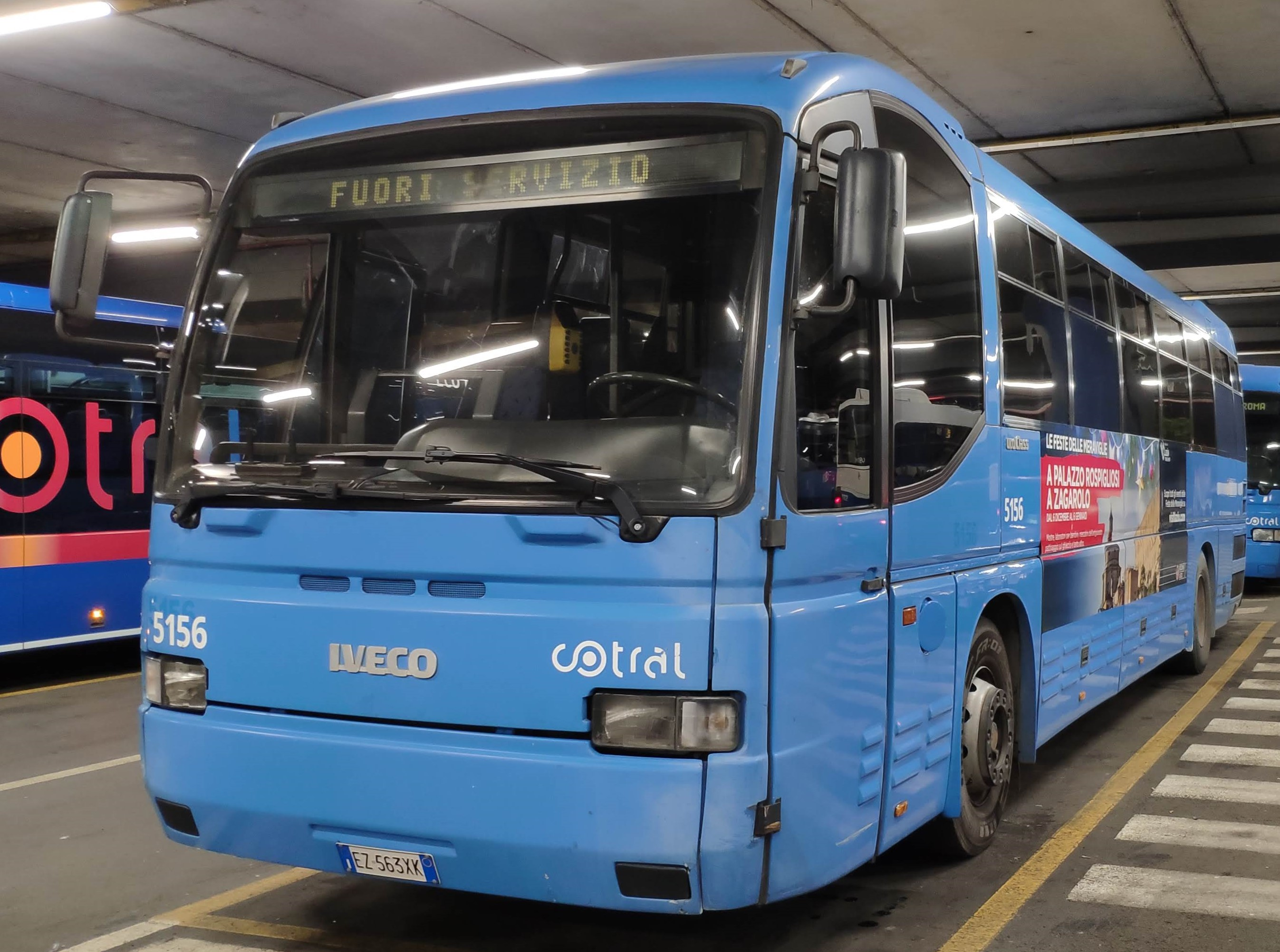
A Cotral Iveco EuroClass bus

Cotral SpA (In Italian: Compagnia Trasporti Laziali or Lazio Transport Company) is a limited company which runs suburban and inter-urban public transport services in the Lazio region of Italy. Cotral connects all the municipalities of Lazio - excluding the island municipalities of Ponza and Ventotene - and with a total of over 8,000 daily trips. Together with ATAC and Trenitalia, it participates in the Metrebus integrated fare system.

== History ==
Founded in 1976 through the merger of regional public transport operators in Lazio, Cotral inherited from one of these, STEFER, the management of the Rome metro, the concession railways Rome-Lido, Rome-Civita Castellana-Viterbo, and Rome-Fiuggi-Frosinone, as well as the tramways of the Castelli Romani.

In 2000, the management of the metro-rail system was separated from the original company with the creation of Met.Ro. (later merged into ATAC), leaving Cotral with the sole management of the interurban and suburban bus network in Lazio.

In the period 2018-2022, the Municipality of Rome initiated and completed the transfer of the Rome-Viterbo and Rome-Lido lines (now renamed "Metromare") to the Lazio Region, which entrusted Cotral with passenger services and Astral with infrastructure management.

== Operations ==
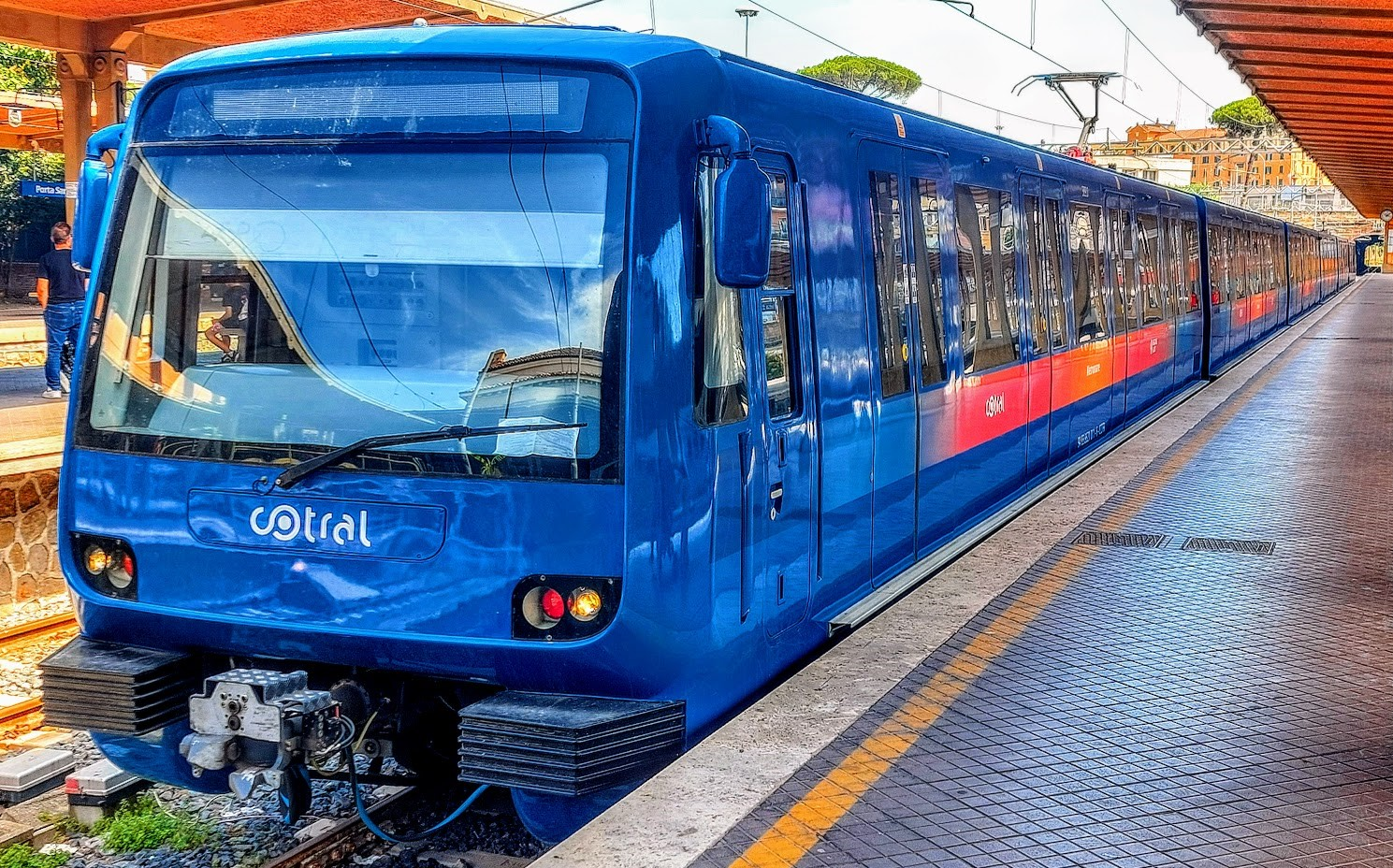
Metromare train on the platform of Roma Porta San Paolo station.

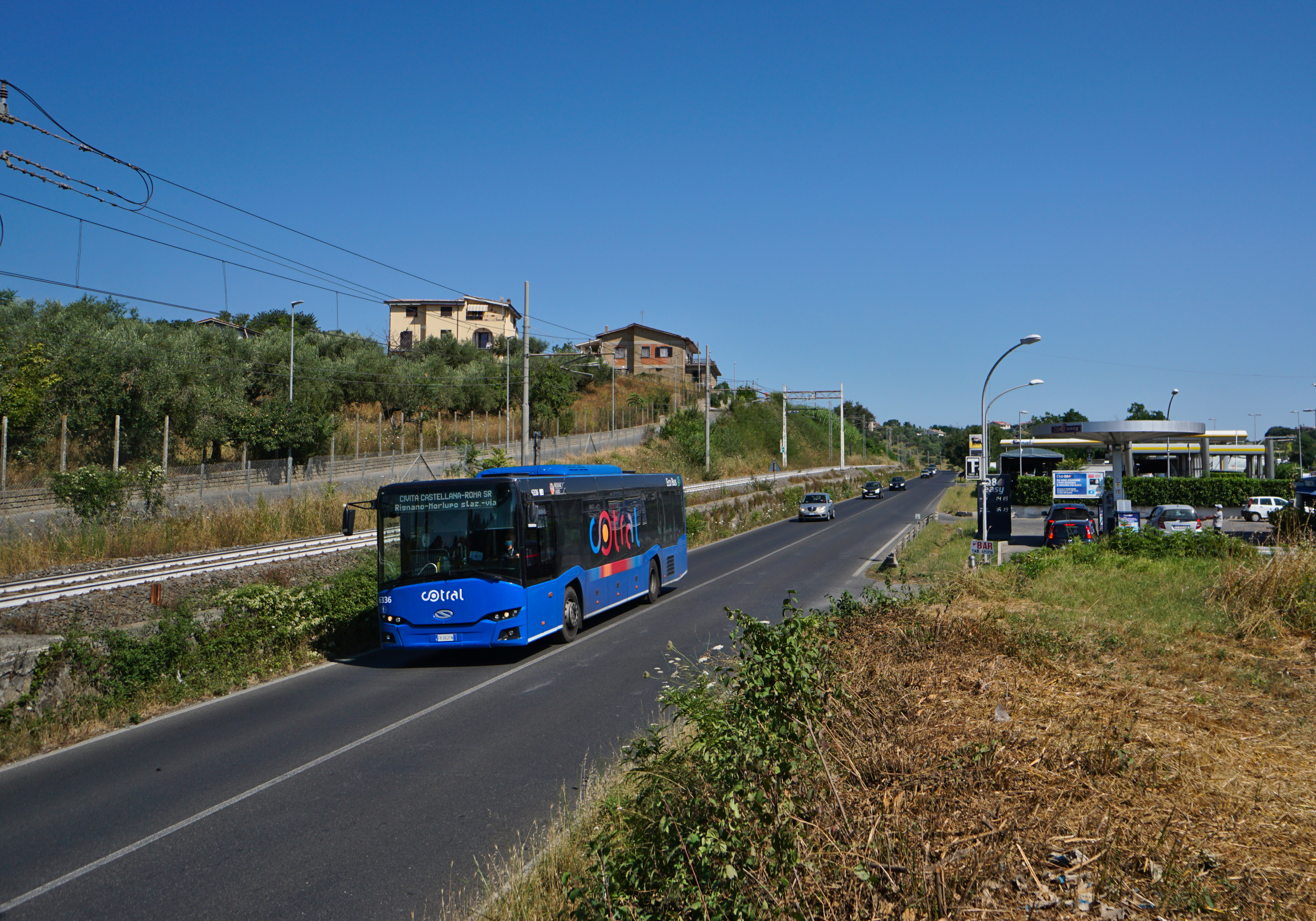
Solaris InterUrbino on Via Flaminia

Cotral manages most of the extra-urban bus connections between the various municipalities of Lazio, with the exception of the island municipalities of Ponza and Ventotene. The Cotral fleet consists, as of 2023, of 1,655 interurban buses with an average age of approximately 6.5 years. It serves 376 municipalities in Lazio, transporting 97.4 million passengers annually.

Since 2024, it has also been managing 7 interregional lines, serving the regions of Tuscany, Umbria, Abruzzo and Campania. Aimed at consolidating the company's presence outside the Lazio region.

The Metromare serves the Ostia district, the seaside resort of Rome, in a 28km stretch from the Ostiense-Porta San Paolo district to the terminus of Via Cristoforo Colombo. The line transports approximately 19 million users annually.

The Rome-Viterbo railway connects a large part of the province of Viterbo and the northern outskirts of Rome with the center of Rome (Piazzale Flaminio). This line has 2 types of service: Urban (limited to connecting the urban area within Rome) and Extraurban (the remaining part of the railway that reaches the terminus in Viterbo). The line transports approximately 12 million passengers annually.

== See also ==
- ATAC SpA
- Transport in Rome
