= Rome–Civita Castellana–Viterbo railway =

Railway line in Italy

Roma–Civita Castellana–Viterbo

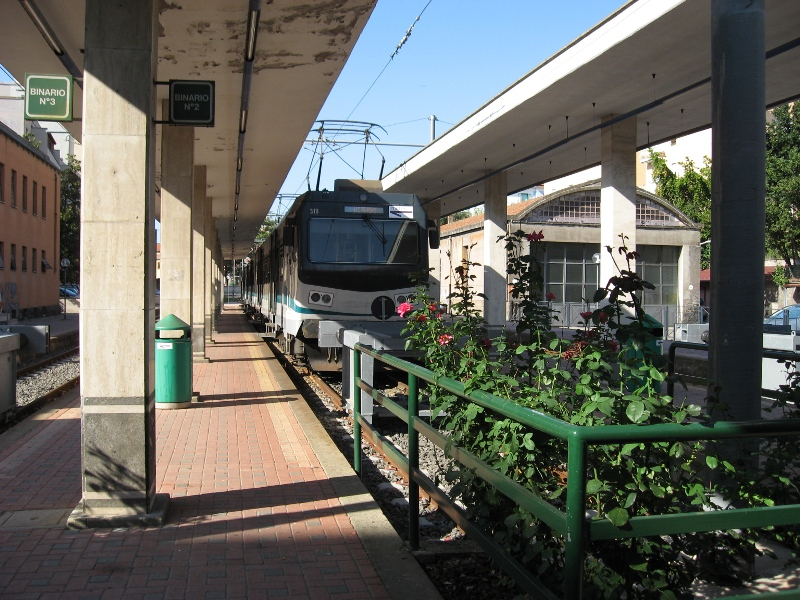
- A Roma Nord train at Viterbo.

Overview
- Status: Operational
- Locale: Rome, Italy
- Termini: Piazzale Flaminio; Viterbo
- Stations: 31 (7 urban, 24 extraurban)
- Website: Cotral (in Italian)

Service
- Type: Commuter rail / Regional rail
- Operator(s): ASTRAL, Cotral

History
- Opened: 1913 (Civita Castellana–Viterbo) 1932 (Rome–Civita Castellana)

Technical
- Line length: 102 km (63 mi)
- Track gauge: 1,435 mm (4 ft 8 1/2 in)
- Electrification: 3,000 V DC

The Rome–Civita Castellana–Viterbo railway is a regional railway line connecting Rome, Italy, with Viterbo, capital city of the Province of Viterbo. The 102 km (63 mi) long line, also known in Rome as the Roma Nord line, after its former concessionaire, is part of Rome's metropolitan and regional railway network.

== Route ==
- Piazzale Flaminio ↔ Viterbo

The Roma Nord, a radial route, has its urban terminus at Piazzale Flaminio, on the northern perimeter of Rome's city centre. From there, it runs in a northerly direction, parallel to the Via Flaminia, as far as Civita Castellana, and then to its ultimate destination, Viterbo. Locally, it is derisively referred to as the "Freccia Viterbese".

== See also ==
- History of rail transport in Italy
- List of railway stations in Lazio
- Rail transport in Italy
- Transport in Rome
