= Port of Civitavecchia =

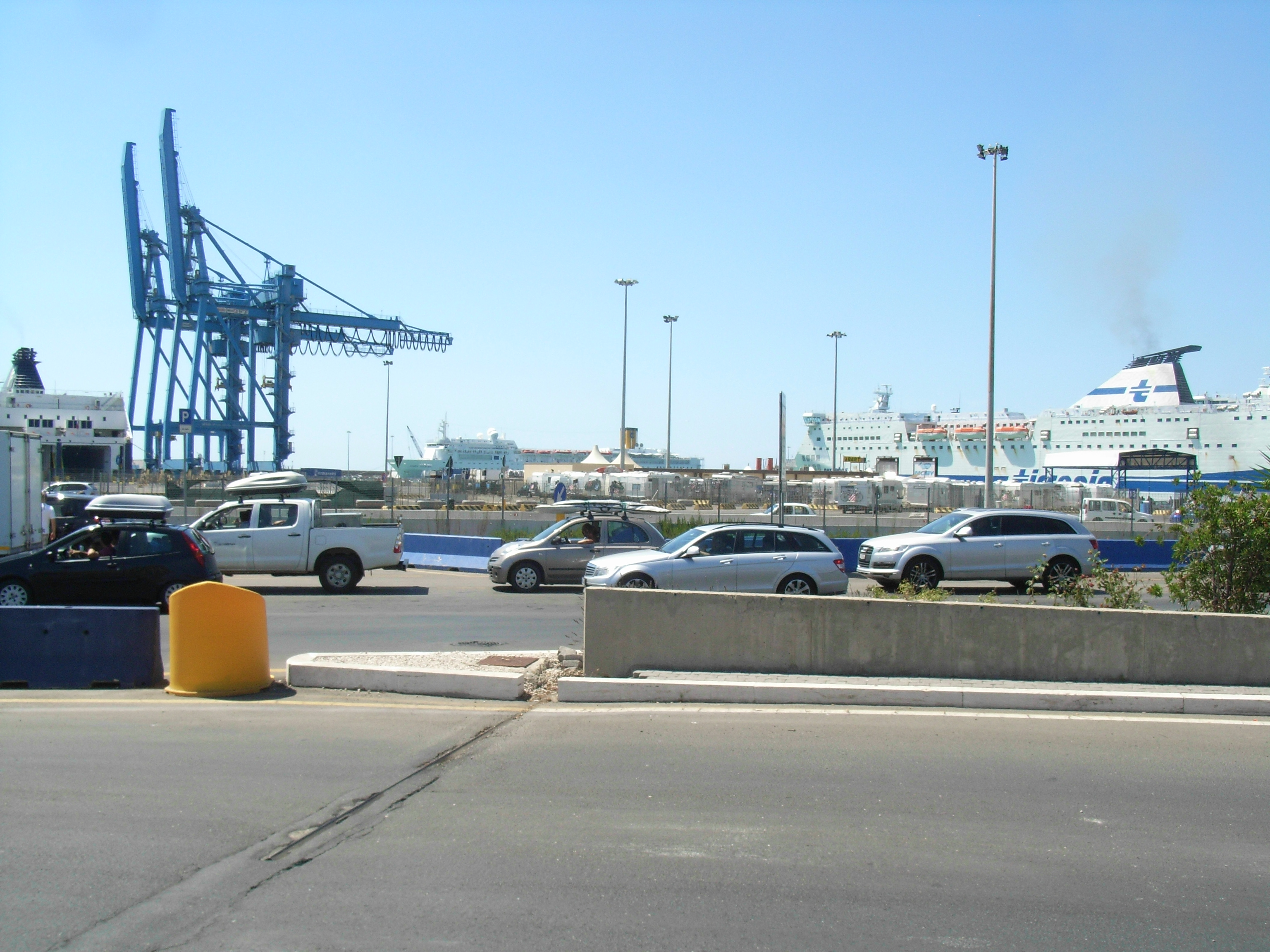
- Interactive map of Port of Civitavecchia

Location
- Country: Italy
- Location: Civitavecchia, Metropolitan City of Rome, Lazio

Details
- Operated by: Autorità di Sistema Portuale del Mar Tirreno Centro Settentrionale
- Owned by: Ports of Rome Fiumicino-Civitavecchia-Gaeta
- No. of wharfs: 26

Statistics
- Annual container volume: 64,387 TEUs (2014)
- Value of cargo: 15,587,776 (2014)
- Passenger traffic: 1,473,269 (2014); 2,141,195 (2014)
- Website www.portidiroma.it

Port of Civitavecchia, also known as "Port of Rome", or Civitavecchia Port of Rome, is the seaport of Civitavecchia, Metropolitan City of Rome, Italy. It is an important hub for the maritime transport in Italy, for goods and passengers. The Rome Cruise Terminal is part of the port. Part of the "Motorways of the Sea", it is linked to several Mediterranean ports and represents one of the main links between the Italian mainland and Sardinia.

The port of Civitavecchia, with approximately 3.33 million passengers per year, is the first Italian port for cruise traffic, the first in Europe, the first in the Mediterranean Sea and among the busiest in the world.

Rome has two additional yacht harbors/marinas: Marina of Rome in Ostia and Riva di Traiano tourist port also in Civitavecchia, and also the Port of Fiumicino used as a canal port.

== History ==
The port of Civitavecchia was built at the behest of Emperor Trajan, founder of the city then known as Centumcellae, around 106 AD. For many centuries it represented the fulcrum of exchanges and contacts between the peoples of the ancient "Mare Nostrum". The emperor's idea was to facilitate the food plan for Rome with another safe landing place and the works were designed by the architect Apollodorus of Damascus. The original layout of the port reflected the architectural criteria of the time with a large, almost circular basin of about 500 metres, two large piers and a barbican, an artificial island jutting out into the sea to protect the basin. The entire structure was surmounted by two opposing towers, later called the Bicchiere and the Lazzaretto (still visible, and rebuilt by Giuliano da Sangallo).

After the fall of the Roman Empire, the port of Civitavecchia and the urban settlement of Centumcellae witnessed a succession of dominations and changes of hands, disputed between the papacy, various municipal powers and frequent Saracen incursions. In the 15th century, after the city definitively returned under papal control, the port of Civitavecchia regained strength and importance. First the Rocca was built, a quadrangular fortification, then in 1508 Pope Julius II entrusted Donato Bramante with the construction work of Fort Michelangelo, which was built on ancient Roman ruins. The fort was completed in 1537 thanks perhaps to the contribution of Michelangelo. In 1608, under the papacy of Paul V, a lighthouse was erected on the southern end of the breakwater island, 31 meters high. On November 26, 1659, the first stone of the arsenal designed by Gian Lorenzo Bernini was laid, which for a long time would form a large part of the city's economy. The crenellated city walls were then built by Pier Paolo Florian, commissioned by Pope Urban VIII in 1630.

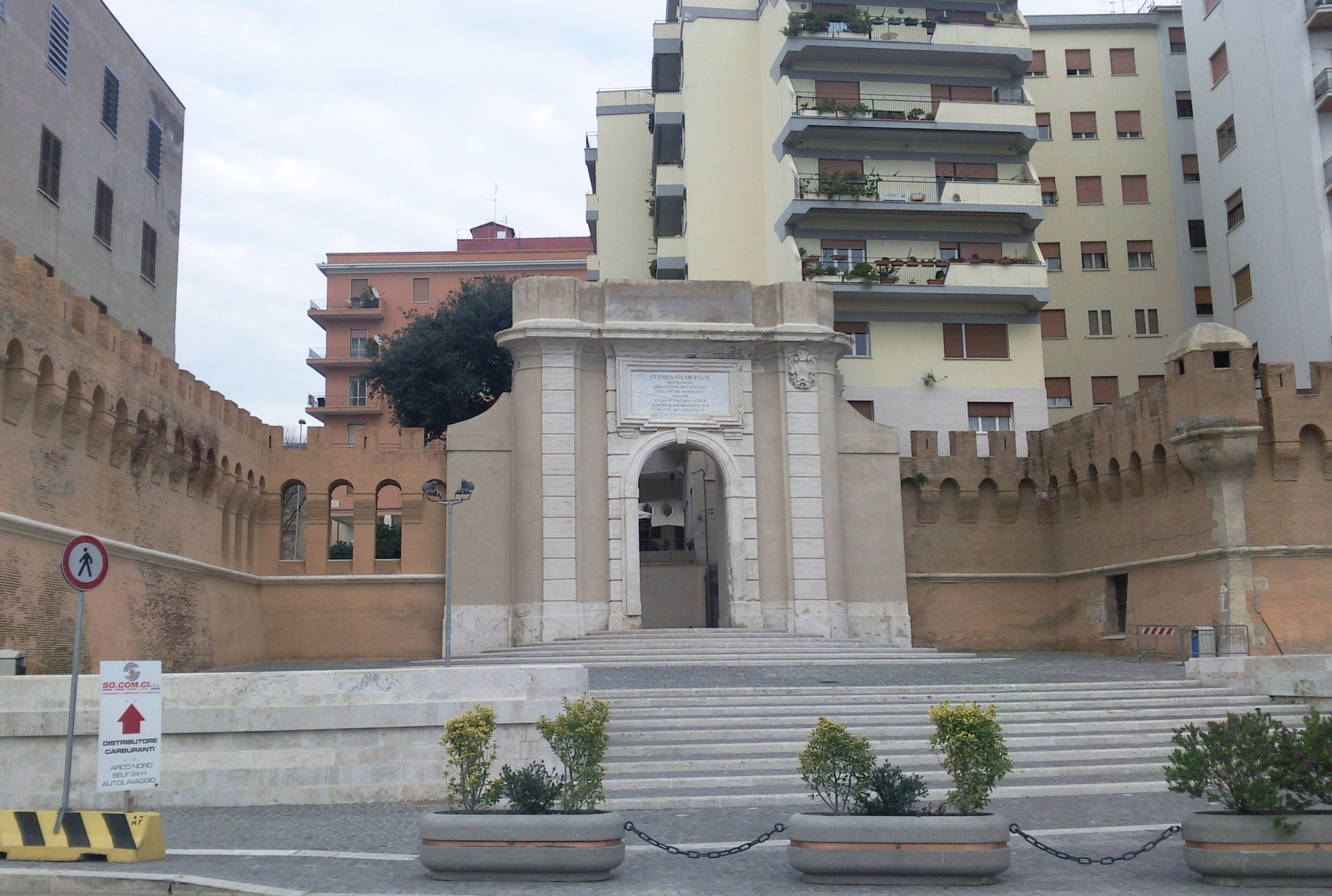
Porta Livorno in the historic port

In 1761, commissioned by Pope Clement XIII, Porta Livorno was built. Some of these structures were destroyed due to bombing during World War II. In particular, in 1943 the Lighthouse, the Arsenal, the Bramante Fort and the Rocca Vecchia were destroyed.

== Information ==
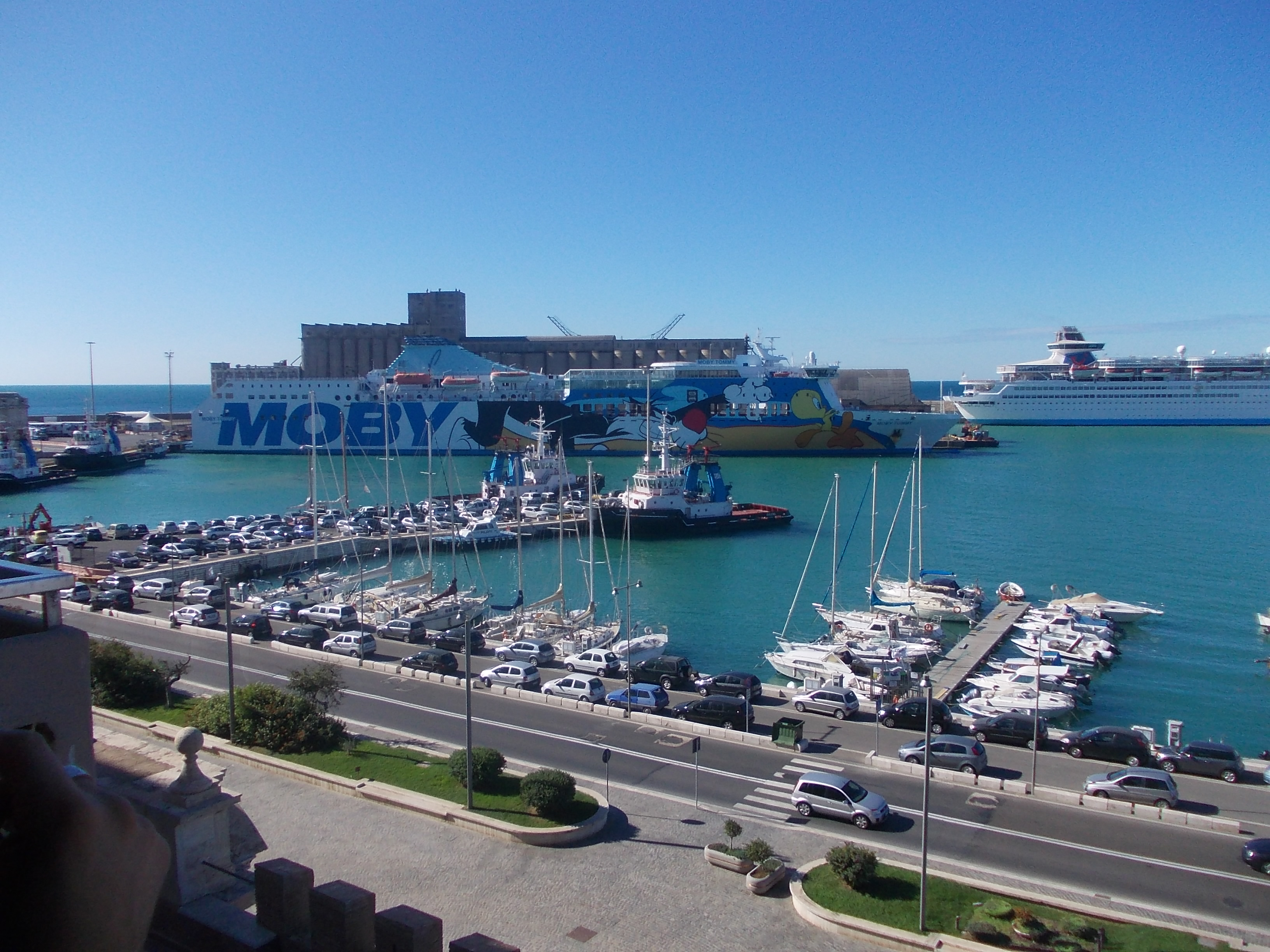
View of the port from Civitavecchia

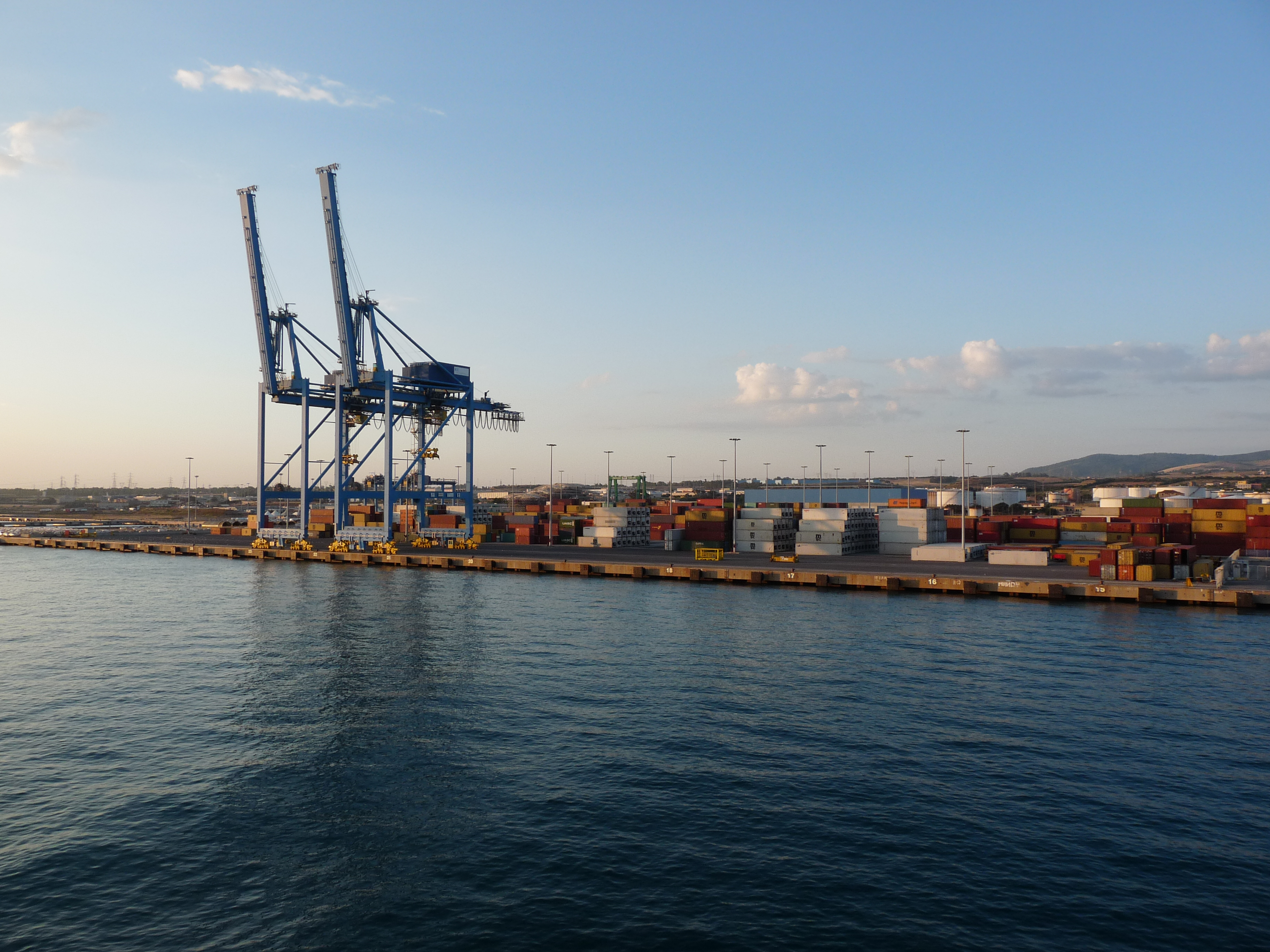
Container terminal

It is a multifunctional port, divided into two macro areas with different market dynamics: to the south, the one dedicated to tourism, yachting and cruises; to the north the area for commercial traffic, fishing and cabotage; today it can count on approximately 1,900,000 m^{2} of docks, 25 operational berths from 100 to 400 m in length, for approximately 13 km of berths; approximately 11 million tonnes of bulk goods are moved every year; in recent years, coaster services (Motorways of the Sea) have grown, i.e. scheduled services dedicated to the transport of passengers and goods on Mediterranean routes.

== Terminals ==
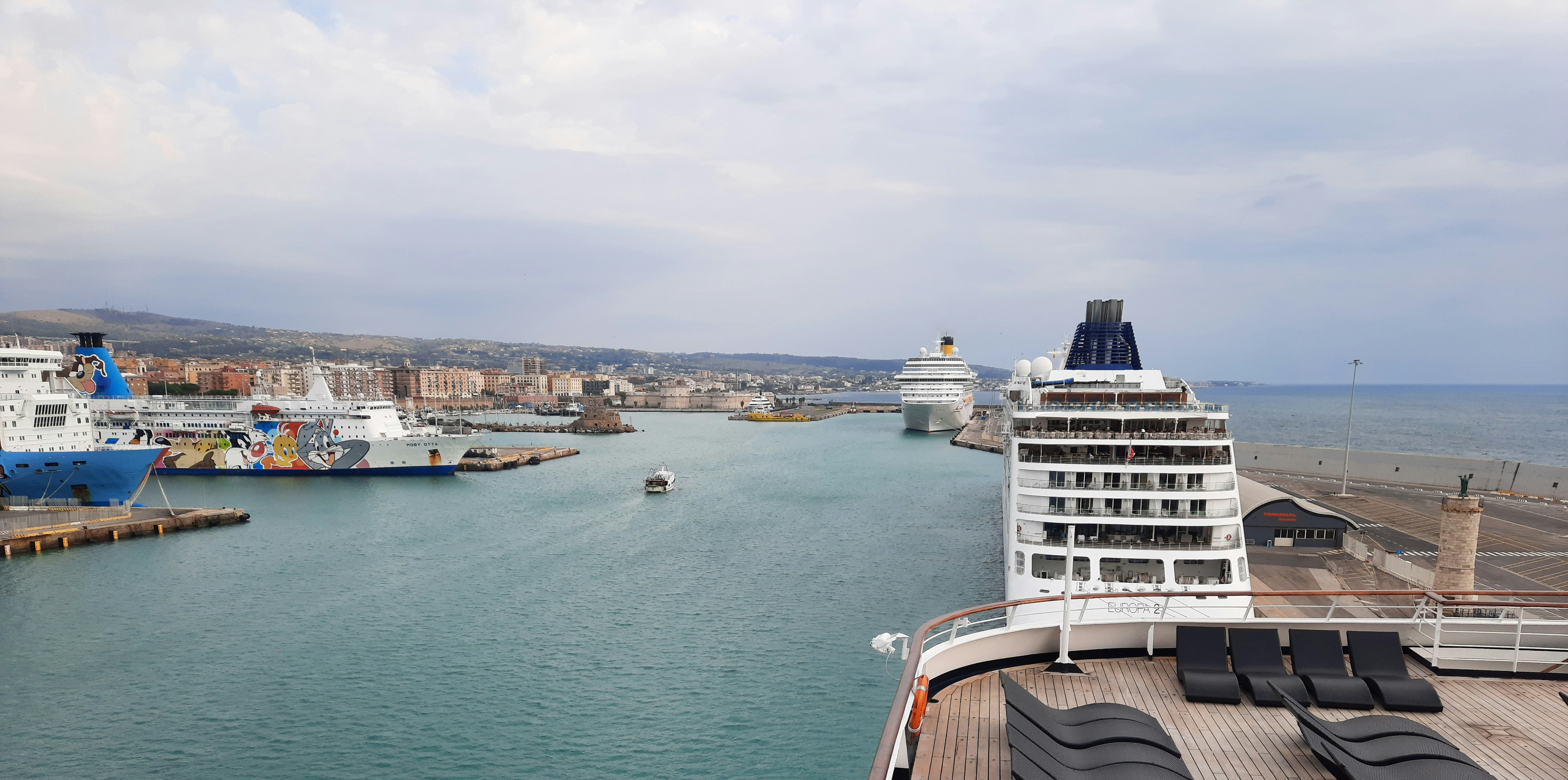
View of the port in 2021

The port is made up of three main terminals divided by service category (ferries, cruises, service centre):

Terminal	Destination	Navigation operator
Terminal Autostrade del Mare (T1)	(Italy) Olbia (Italy) Cagliari (Italy) Arbatax (Italy) Porto Torres (Italy) Palermo (Italy) Termini Imerese (Spain) Barcelona (Tunisia) Tunis	Tirrenia; Grimaldi Lines; GNV
Roma Cruise Terminal (RCT)	Italy; Spain; France; Greece; Turkey; Croatia; Montenegro; Cyprus; Tunisia; United States; Barbados	Costa Crociere, MSC Cruises, Royal Caribbean, Norwegian Cruise Line, Princess Cruises, Celebrity Cruises, Cunard Line, Disney Cruise Line, Carnival Cruise Line
Terminal Largo della pace	Infopoint; Service center of the port of Civitavecchia	Infopoint

== Ground transportation ==
The port of Civitavecchia can be reached by roads:

- A12 motorway
- Strada statale 1 Via Aurelia
- Strada statale 675 Umbro-Laziale
- Strada statale 698 del Porto di Civitavecchia

It is served by trains from the Civitavecchia railway station:

- Civitavecchia Express, dedicated to cruise passengers and with seat reservation, carries out the Civitavecchia-Roma San Pietro-Roma Ostiense itinerary. It is carried out twice a day from 2019 during the tourist season. The connection with the port is guaranteed by Trenitalia's PortLink service.
- Roma Termini - Civitavecchia, of the FL lines that connect the port with Roma Termini, Roma San Pietro, Roma Trastevere, Roma Ostiense, Roma Tuscolana and the Rome Metro.

== See also ==
- Transport in Italy
- Transport in Rome
- List of busiest ports in Europe
- List of busiest cruise ports by passengers
- Marina of Rome
- Rome Fiumicino Airport
