= Ladispoli–Cerveteri railway station =

Railway station in Italy

Ladispoli–Cerveteri
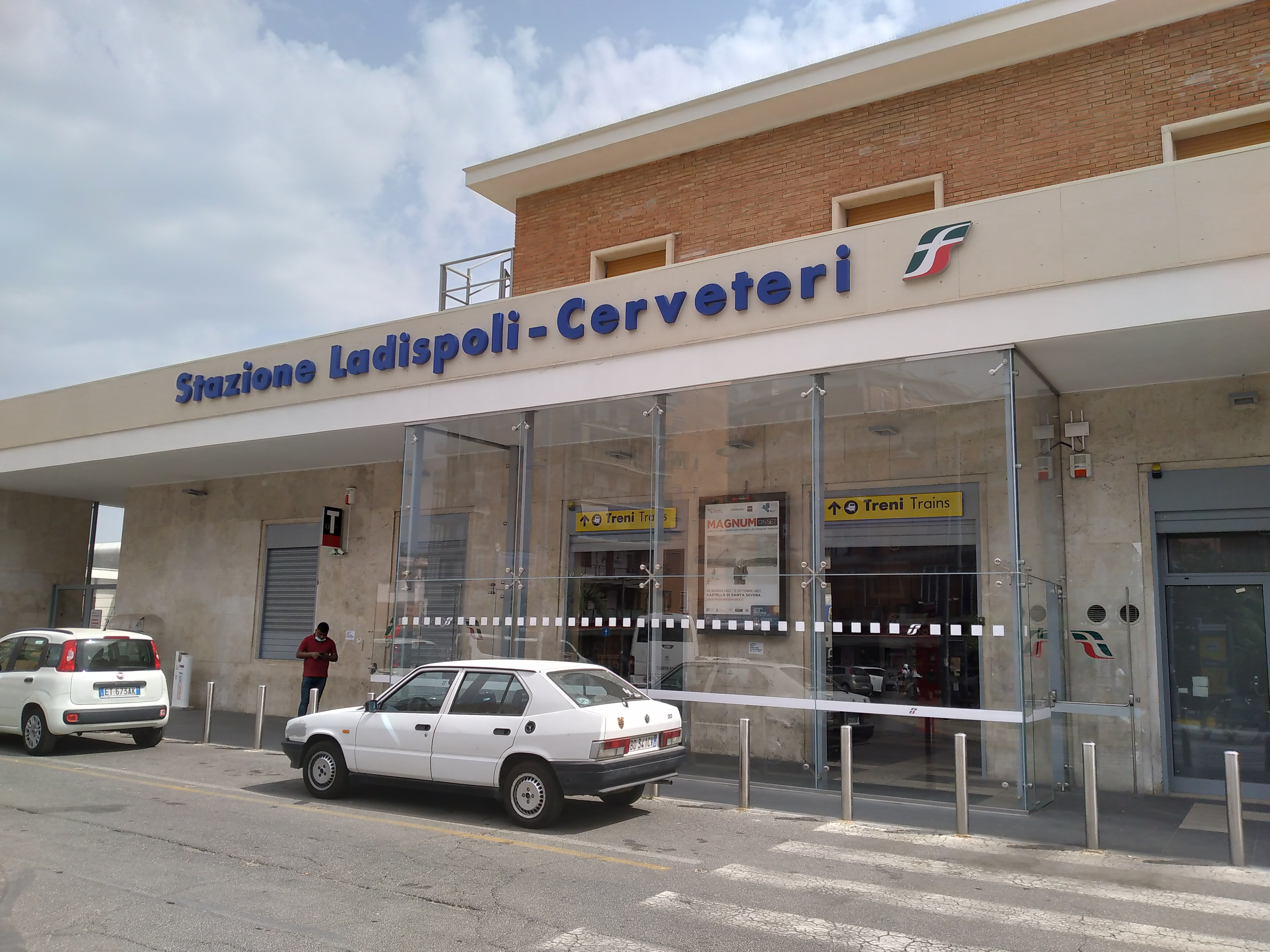
- The station in 2021

General information
- Location: Piazzale Roma, 1, 00055 Ladispoli RM; Ladispoli; Italy
- Coordinates: 41°57′12.24″N 12°04′53.40″E
- Owner: RFI
- Lines: Pisa–Livorno–Rome; Roma Termini–Civitavecchia
- Platforms: 5
- Train operators: Trenitalia
- Connections: Urban and suburban buses

Other information
- Classification: Silver

History
- Opened: 15 June 1939; 87 years ago
Location
- Location within Lazio Location within Italy

Ladispoli–Cerveteri railway station is a railway station located along the Pisa–Rome railway. Located in the town of Ladispoli, it also serves the neighboring municipality of Cerveteri.

== History ==
The station, originally called "Cerveteri–Ladispoli", was opened on 15 June 1939, replacing the previous Ladispoli station located on the Palo–Ladispoli branch line, which was simultaneously abolished by the will of the royal decree of 16 June 1938 for the remodulation of traffic on the Rome–Civitavecchia–Pisa–Livorno line. The then stop became a station only in August 1974 with the subsequent track extension.

On December 11, 2005, it assumed the new name of “Ladispoli–Cerveteri.”

== Features ==
The station has a passenger building that houses the Trenitalia ticket office and bar. It has five through tracks used for passenger service.

== Movement ==
All regional trains passing through the station stop at the station. Destinations are Civitavecchia, Grosseto, Montalto di Castro, Pisa, Roma Tiburtina, Roma Ostiense, Ponte Galeria, and Roma Termini.

The typical offer during soft weekday hours is one train every 30 minutes to Roma Termini and Civitavecchia, one train every hour to Grosseto, and one every two hours to Pisa.

In the morning rush hour, about every half hour, reinforcement trains depart from Ladispoli-Cerveteri station in the direction of Rome.

Preceding station	Lazio regional railways	Following station
Torre in Pietra–Palidoro towards Roma Termini	FL5	Marina di Cerveteri towards Civitavecchia
