= Branch line =

Minor railway line

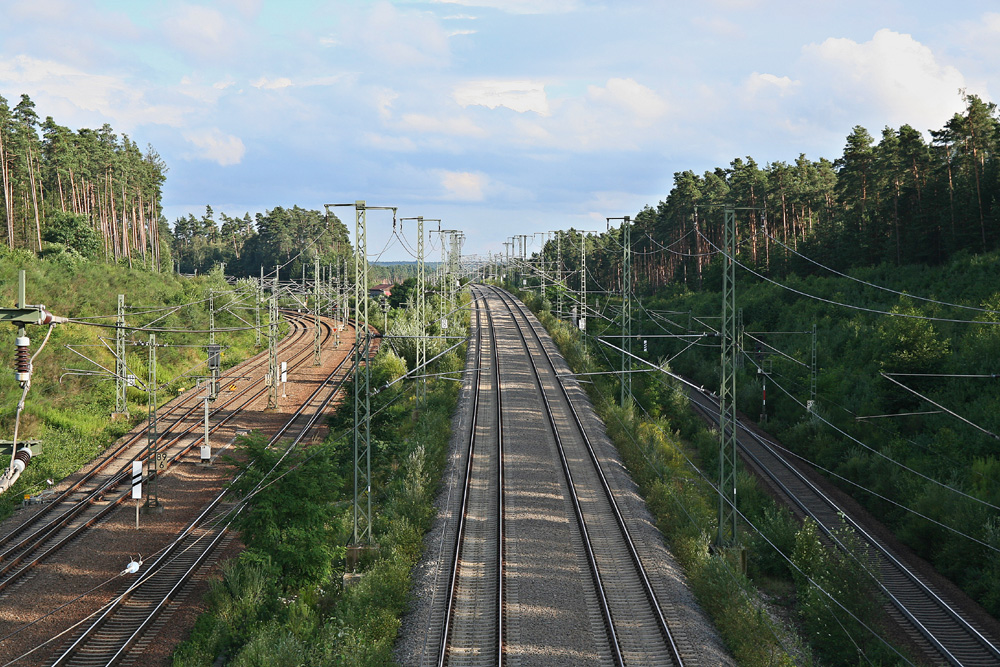
Railway connection between the new Nuremberg–Munich high-speed railway and Germany's historical rail network.

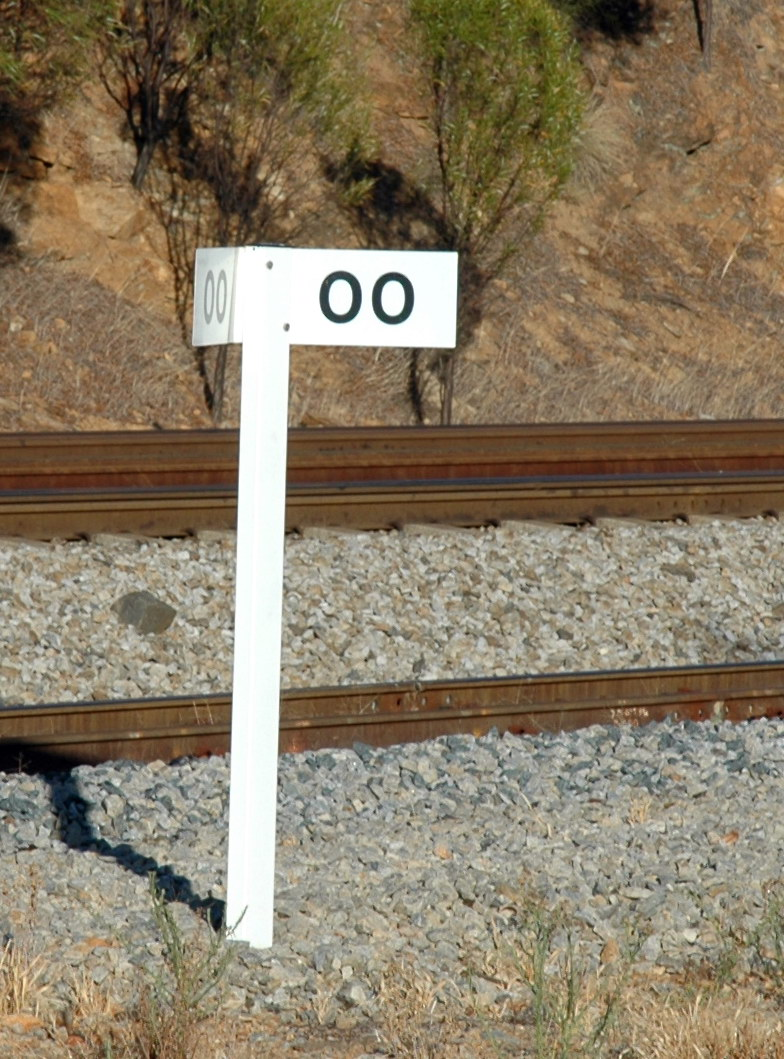
The "0-kilometre peg" marks the start of a branch line in Western Australia.

A branch line is a secondary railway line which branches off a more important through route, usually a main line. A very short branch line may be called a spur line. Branch lines may serve one or more industries, or a city or town not located on a main line. Branch lines may also connect two or more main lines.

== Industrial spur ==
An industrial spur is a type of secondary track used by railroads to allow customers at a location to load and unload freight vehicles without interfering with other railroad operations.

Industrial spurs can vary greatly in length and freight vehicle capacity, depending on the requirements of the customer the spur is serving. In heavily industrialized areas, it is not uncommon for one industrial spur to have multiple sidings to several different customers. Typically, spurs are serviced by local trains responsible for collecting small numbers of rail vehicles and delivering them to a larger yard, where they are sorted and dispatched in larger trains with other cars destined to similar locations. Because industrial spurs generally have less capacity and traffic than a mainline, they tend to have lower maintenance and signalling (train control) standards.

Before the rise of moving freight long distances by road, starting in the 1930s, railroads were the primary means of transportation around the world. Industries of the era were commonly built along rail lines specifically to allow for easy access to shipping. Short (under a mile, often only several hundred yards) industrial spurs with very small (under ten car) capacities were a common sight along railroads in industrial and rural cities alike. As automobile and roadway technology improved throughout the early and mid-20th century, most low-volume industry spurs were abandoned in favour of the greater flexibility and economic savings of road transport. Today, railroads remain the most economical way to ship large quantities of material, a fact that is reflected in industrial spurs. Most modern day spurs serve very large industries that require hundreds, if not thousands, of carloads a year.

== Around the world ==
=== Europe ===
There is an international branch line between Italy and Vatican: the 300-metre Vatican Railway, connecting from the Pisa-Rome railway mainline at Roma San Pietro railway station, to Vatican City station.

==== United Kingdom ====
Many British railway branch lines were closed as a result of the "Beeching cuts" in the 1960s, although some have been re-opened as heritage railways.

The smallest branch line that is still in operation in the UK is the Stourbridge Town Branch Line from Stourbridge Junction going to Stourbridge Town. Operating on a single track, the journey is 0.8 miles (1.3 kilometres) long.

=== North America ===
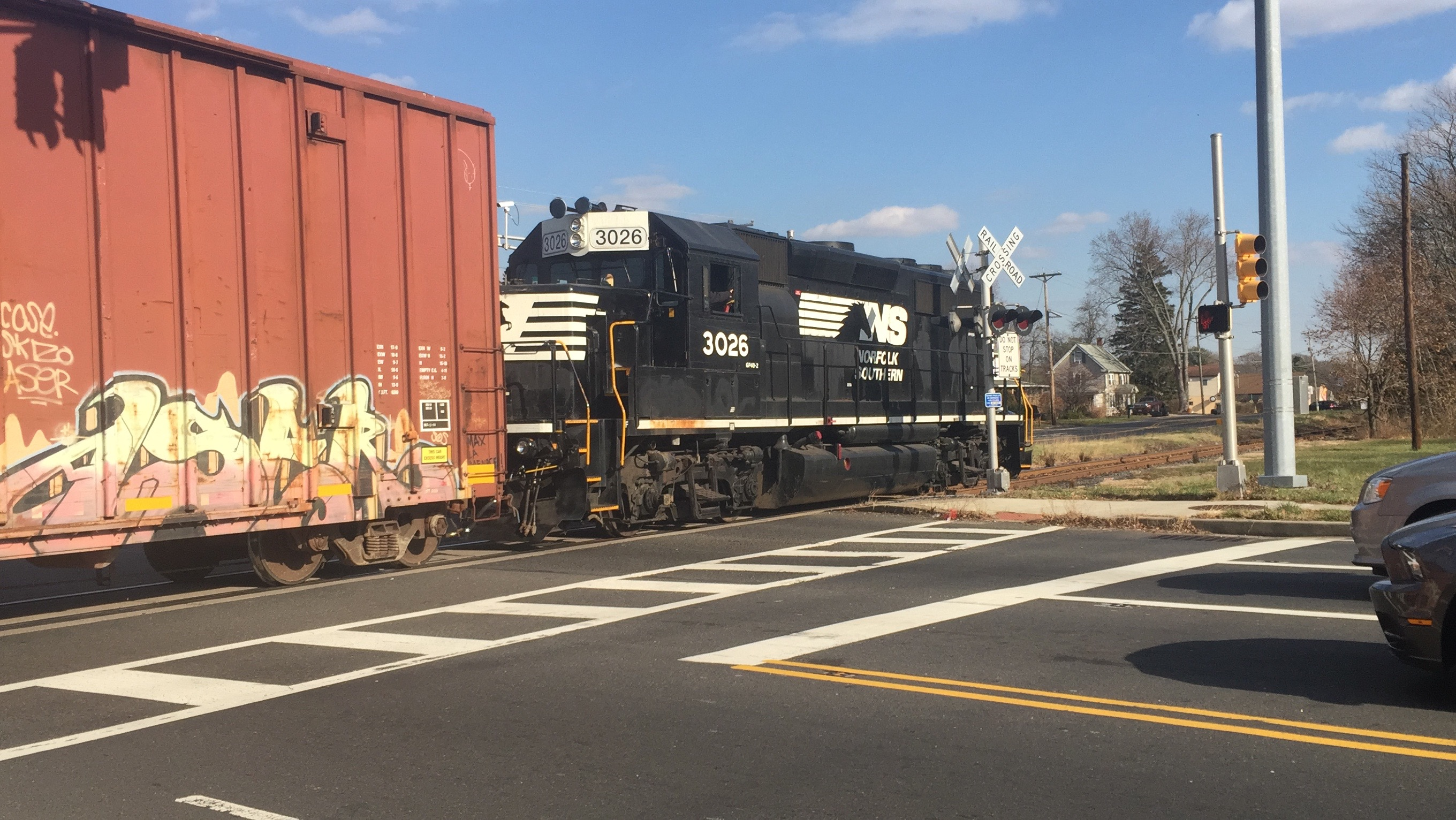
Conrail Shared Assets Operations' Hainesport Industrial Track is a prime example of a freight branch line. This line sees one short freight train a day primarily to serve a paper mill, industrial park, and lumber yard in Mount Laurel, Hainesport, and Mount Holly, New Jersey, respectively. The nearest main line railroad is roughly six miles (9.7 km) from where this photograph was taken.

In North America, little-used branch lines are often sold by large railroads to become new common carrier short-line railroads of their own. Throughout the United States and Canada, branch lines link smaller towns too distant from the main line to be served efficiently, or to serve a certain industrial site such as a power station either because of a location away from the main line or to reduce congestion. They were typically built to lower standards, using lighter rail and shallow roadbeds when compared to main lines.

==== Canada ====
Much of Canada's branch line history relates to large rail transport conglomerates (such as the Grand Trunk, Canadian National, or Canadian Pacific) which would acquire formerly independent short line railways for use as branch lines, with the short line often continuing to exist as a subsidiary. For example, when the Canadian Pacific acquired the Algoma Eastern Railway (a short line) in 1930, it soon after abandoned much of the Algoma Eastern mainline, but retained sections close to Algoma Eastern–Canadian Pacific junctions as short branch lines or spurs.

The National Transportation Act of 1967 provided government subsidies for branch lines. Western railway development in Canada worked in concert with land settlement and cultivation, as pioneers were settled near railway lines, often on land the railways had owned. However, by the mid-20th century, railways began neglecting lines in western agricultural regions. This was historically driven by factors such as the Crow Rate, which regulated the price railways could charge for shipping grain. Railways had little incentive to invest in rural Prairie branch lines, but were legally unable to abandon them under the National Transportation Act, which also did not provide a subsidy for grain transport, and instead allowed railways to absorb branch line subsidies freely without making effort to improve the profitability of the lines. The term "grain-dependent branch lines" began being used as early as 1978 to refer to the special case of these branch lines in agricultural areas whose viability depended on the economics of grain transport. The Western Grain Transportation Act of 1983 addressed this case specifically, but was repealed in 1994 in the wake of the North American Free Trade Agreement and budget-balancing initiatives in favour of a one-time payout by the federal government directly to farmers, to arrange transport of grain themselves. From the mid-1970s to the late 2010s, more than 9,300 kilometres (5,800 mi) of Prairie branch lines were abandoned or had a discontinuance of service.

David Blyth Hanna, the first president of the Canadian National Railway, said that although most branch lines cannot pay for themselves, they are even essential to make main lines pay.

==== United States ====
In the United States, abandonment of unproductive branch lines was a byproduct of deregulation of the rail industry through the Staggers Act.

The Princeton Branch is a commuter rail line and service owned and operated by New Jersey Transit (NJT) in the U.S. state of New Jersey. The line is a short branch of the Northeast Corridor Line, running from Princeton Junction northwest to Princeton with no intermediate stops. Also known as the "Dinky Line", at 2.9 mi (4.7 km) it is the shortest scheduled commuter rail line in the United States. The run takes 4 minutes, 47 seconds.

Other than the Princeton Line, other surviving branch lines include the Gladstone Branch in New Jersey; as well as the New Canaan Branch, Danbury Branch, and Waterbury Branch in Connecticut. The Long Island Rail Road also refers to its services as "branches".

=== South America ===
==== Chile ====
In Chile, there are many branch lines on its main line, but only a few remain operational. Most only operating in touristic services (like the Antilhue-Valdivia branch line), others have been taken over by other railways (like the San Rosendo-Talcahuano branch line, which has been taken over by Biotrén and the Laja-Talcahuano train service) however, there is one branch line that still remains as fully operative. The Talca-Constitución branch line, which uses trains with bus motors.

=== Asia ===
==== Hong Kong ====
Two extensions to the MTR rapid transit network were built as branches of existing lines: the Lok Ma Chau Spur Line to Lok Ma Chau station, which opened in 2007; and the South Tseung Kwan O Spur Line to LOHAS Park station, opened in 2009.

Earlier, a spur line was built in 1985 on the East Rail line to serve Racecourse station, bypassing Fo Tan station.

Also, the Tsim Sha Tsui Extension was built in 2004 on the East Rail line to serve East Tsim Sha Tsui station. However, after the Kowloon Southern Link was completed in 2009, this spur line turns into a section of the West Rail line (now Tuen Ma line).

Discontinued services include the Sha Tau Kok Railway and the Wo Hop Shek Branch.

==== India ====
On the Delhi Metro, the Blue Line has a Branch Line with 8 Stations, linking Yamuna Bank to Ghaziabad via Anand Vihar ISBT and terminating at Vaishali.

The first section of the Branch opened in 2010 with Anand Vihar as its terminal with six stations. It was further extended to Vaishali in 2011. The line is planned to be extended from Vaishali to Mohan Nagar via Sahibabad Station to link with the main line.

==== Singapore ====
The East West Line of the MRT system in Singapore has a two-station branch to Changi Airport. The first station, Expo, opened in 2001. It was extended to Changi Airport station the next year.

From 1990 to 1996, the section of the North South Line between Jurong East and Choa Chu Kang stations was operated as a separate line, known as the Branch line. It was merged into the North–South Line with the opening of the Woodlands Extension in 1996. The future Jurong Region Line and Cross Island Line will also have branch lines.

==== Thailand ====
There are two notable spur lines within the various rapid transit systems in Bangkok, of which one is under construction and one has been tendered.

The MRT Pink Line will have a spur line reaching into "Impact, Muang Thong Thani", a commercial complex. This spur line, known as the Mueang Thong Thani Line, or the Impact Link, is currently under a soft launch, and is accessible via the Muang Thong Thani station.

The SRT Light Red Line will have a branch line heading towards Siriraj Hospital and the adjacent MRT Station. This branch line has been tendered, and will be constructed along with the main line, which will go to Salaya and possibly beyond.

=== Oceania ===
==== New Zealand ====
New Zealand once had a very extensive network of branch lines, especially in the South Island regions of Canterbury, Otago, and Southland. Many were built in the late 19th century to open up inland regions for farming and other economic activities. The branches in the South Island regions were often general-purpose lines that carried predominantly agricultural traffic, but lines elsewhere were often built to serve a specific resource: on the West Coast, an extensive network of branch lines was built in rugged terrain to serve coal mines, while in the central North Island and the Bay of Plenty Region, lines were built inland to provide rail access to large logging operations.

Today, many of the branch lines have been closed, including almost all of the general-purpose country lines. Those that remain serve ports or industries far from main lines such as coal mines, logging operations, large dairying factories, and steelworks. In Auckland and Wellington, two branch lines in each city exist solely for commuter passenger trains. For more, see the list of New Zealand railway lines.
