= Monte Ciocci–San Pietro cycleway =

Cycle route in Rome, Italy

Monte Ciocci–San Pietro
- Location: Rome, Italy
- Established: 2025
Trail map

The Monte Ciocci–San Pietro cycleway is a 1.1–1.5 km-long (0.7–0.9 mi) cycle track opened in April 2025 in Rome, Italy, to connect Monte Ciocci Park to Roma San Pietro railway station. The route combines old railway infrastructure and crosses the Vatican railway with a new level crossing.

With its connections to other routes, it now forms a branch of the Via Francigena walking/cycling route from Canterbury to Rome. Upon opening, Mayor of Rome Roberto Gualtieri compared the route to the High Line in New York.

== Route ==
At the north end of the route is the Monte Ciocci Park indirectly connecting to the existing Monte Mario‒Monte Ciocci cycleway. After descending and ascending to reach Valle Aurelia viaduct, the route uses the single-track viaduct, and single-track former railway tunnel under Pontifical Minor Roman Seminary. The south end of the tunnel is approximately 8 metres (26 ft) below street level. A zig-zag ramp structure raises the route allowing continuation via a segregated path along the north side of Via Nicolò Quinto.

Next to the Vatican walls, the route drops using a ramp opposite the Vatican City railway station platform back to railway track level to cross the Vatican railway at the end of the station platform. Here is a junction with the existing Passeggiata del Gelsomino east along Via della Stazione Vaticana towards St. Peter's Square, or southwards over the railway viaduct to Roma San Pietro railway station.

== Construction ==
Construction of the route was estimated at €5 million and cost €6.7 million.
