= Roma Aurelia railway station =

Railway station in Italy

Roma Aurelia
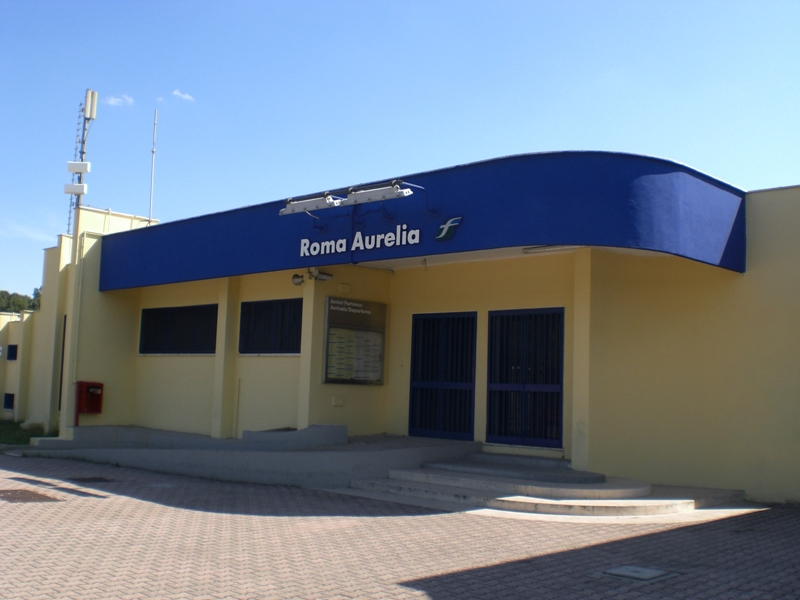
- The passenger building.

General information
- Location: Via della Stazione Aurelia 99; Roma RM; Rome, Rome, Lazio; Italy
- Coordinates: 41°52′58″N 12°23′37″E
- Operator: Rete Ferroviaria Italiana
- Lines: Pisa–Livorno–Roma; Roma Termini-Civitavecchia
- Distance: 9.18 km (5.70 mi) from Roma Termini
- Tracks: 4
- Train operators: Trenitalia
- Connections: ATAC & Cotral buses

Other information
- Classification: Silver

History
- Opened: 1990
Location
- Click on the map for a fullscreen view

Roma Aurelia railway station (Italian: Stazione di Roma Aurelia) is a station serving the western zone of Rome and comune of Rome, Italy. It forms part of the Pisa–Livorno–Rome railway.

The station is currently managed by Rete Ferroviaria Italiana (RFI). Train services are operated by Trenitalia. Each of these companies is a subsidiary of Ferrovie dello Stato (FS), Italy's state-owned rail company.

== History and structures ==
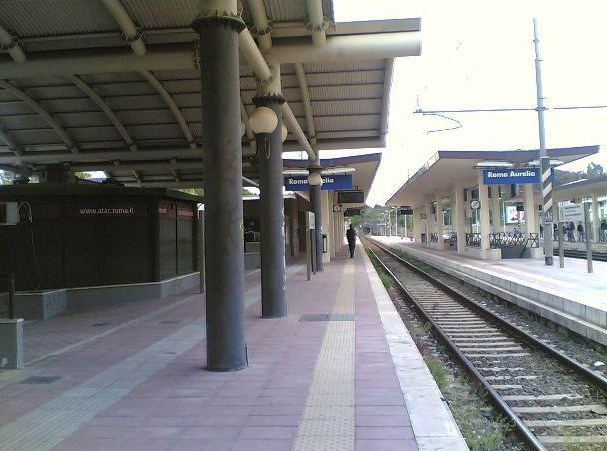
Platform and tracks of the station

The construction began in the 1930s, in a different form, and in a different position from the current one. In 1985 the station was restructured.

The station has a passenger building "closed to the passenger service" which houses the platforms and the toilets. It has 4 functional tracks used for the passenger service and there are ticket offices for tourist buses.

== Passenger and train movements ==
Ferrovie regionali del Lazio FR5 commuter line pass through the station.

== Interchanges ==
- 028 - 246 - 246P - 247 - 985
- Suburban Buses (Cotral)
- Suburban Buses (Cotral) to Fiumicino Airport

== See also ==
- History of rail transport in Italy
- List of railway stations in Lazio
- Rail transport in Italy
- Railway stations in Italy

Preceding station	Lazio regional railways	Following station
Roma San Pietro towards Roma Termini	FL5	Maccarese-Fregene towards Civitavecchia
