= Trastevere (disambiguation) =

Trastevere is the 13th rione of Rome, Italy.

Trastevere may also refer to:

- Trastevere (song), a song by Italian rock band Måneskin
- Trastevere (film), a 1971 Italian comedy film
- ASD Trastevere Calcio, an Italian football club based in Rome, Italy
- Roma Trastevere railway station, major railway station serving the city and comune of Rome, Italy
