= FL5 (Lazio regional railways) =

Civitavecchia–Roma Termini
- FL5

Overview
- Status: Operational
- Locale: Rome, Italy
- Termini: Civitavecchia; Roma Termini
- Website: trenitalia.com

Service
- Type: Regional rail
- System: Lazio regional railways
- Operator(s): Trenitalia

Technical
- Line length: 77 km (48 mi)
- Track gauge: 1,435 mm (4 ft 8 1/2 in)
Route map
The Lazio regional railways network.

The FL5 (until 2012 FR5) is a regional rail route. It forms part of the network of the Lazio regional railways (Italian: ferrovie regionali del Lazio), which is operated by Trenitalia, and converges on the city of Rome, Italy.

The route operates over the infrastructure of the Pisa–Livorno–Rome railway. Within the territory of the comune of Rome, it plays the role of a commuter railway. It is estimated that on average about 40,000 passengers travel on an FR5 train each day.

The designation FL5 appears only in publicity material (e.g. public transport maps), in the official timetables, and on signs at some stations. The electronic destination boards at stations on the FL5 route show only the designation "R5" for that route.

== Route ==
- Civitavecchia ↔ Roma Termini

The FL5, a radial route, runs from the west coast at Civitavecchia in a south easterly direction, via the Pisa–Livorno–Rome railway, to Roma San Pietro, and then around the southern side of Rome's city centre to Roma Termini.

== Stations ==
The stations on the FL5 are as follows:

- Roma Termini LE
- Roma Tuscolana
- Roma Ostiense
- Roma Trastevere
- Roma San Pietro
- Roma Aurelia (limit of urban service)
- Maccarese-Fregene
- Torre in Pietra-Palidoro
- Palo Laziale
- Ladispoli-Cerveteri
- Marina di Cerveteri
- Santa Severa
- Santa Marinella
- Civitavecchia

== See also ==
- History of rail transport in Italy
- List of railway stations in Lazio
- Rail transport in Italy
- Transport in Rome
