= Roma Trastevere railway station =

Railway station serving the city and comune of Rome, Italy

Roma Trastevere
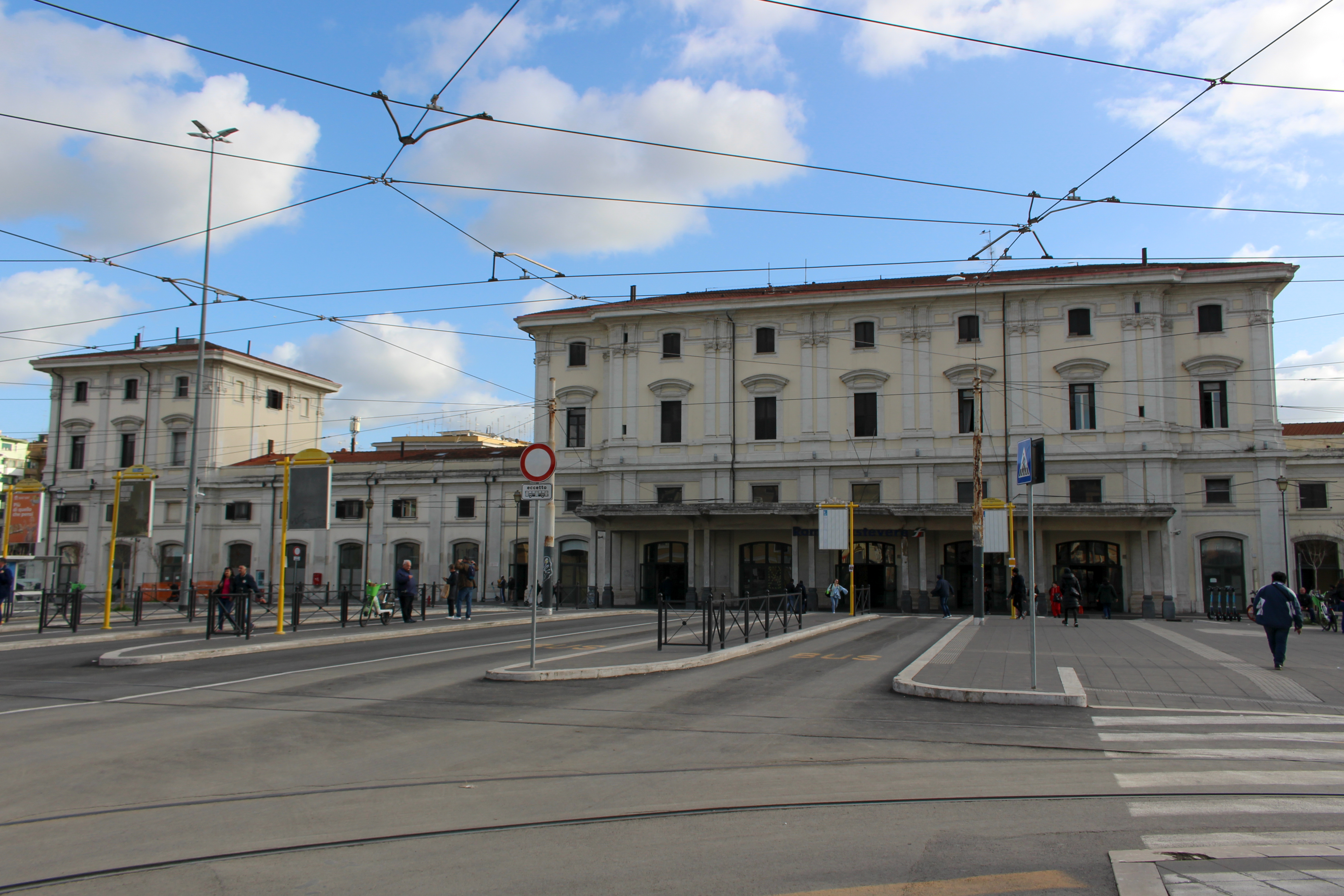
- The passenger building

General information
- Location: Piazza Flavio Biondo 1-20; 00153 Roma RM; Rome, Rome, Lazio; Italy
- Coordinates: 41°52′22″N 12°27′58″E,
- Operator: Rete Ferroviaria Italiana; Centostazioni
- Lines: Pisa–Livorno–Roma; Orte-Fiumicino Aeroporto; Roma Tiburtina-Viterbo; Roma Termini-Civitavecchia
- Distance: 8.221 km (5.108 mi) from Roma Termini
- Train operators: Trenitalia
- Connections: Line 3 (Rome Trams); Line 8 (Rome Trams)

Other information
- Classification: Gold

History
- Opened: 1 May 1911; 115 years ago
Location
- Click on the map for a fullscreen view

Roma Trastevere railway station (Italian: Stazione di Roma Trastevere) is a major railway station serving the city and comune of Rome, Italy. Opened in 1911, it forms part of the Pisa–Livorno–Rome, Rome–Fiumicino railways (FL1), Rome-Viterbo (FL3) and Rome-Civitavecchia (FL5).

The station is currently managed by Rete Ferroviaria Italiana (RFI). However, the commercial area of the passenger building is managed by Centostazioni. Train services are operated by Trenitalia. Each of these companies is a subsidiary of Ferrovie dello Stato (FS), Italy's state-owned rail company.

== Location ==
Roma Trastevere railway station is situated at Piazza Flavio Biondo, southwest of the city centre. It is at the southern end of the Trastevere district, close to the districts of Marconi and Portuense.

== History ==
The original Roma Trastevere railway station was more centrally located, at Piazza Ippolito Nievo. That station replaced the Roma Porta Portese railway station, which had been opened on 24 April 1859, upon the inauguration of the Rome–Civitavecchia section of the Pisa–Livorno–Rome railway.

The present station was opened on 1 May 1911, together with minor deviations of both the Pisa–Livorno–Rome railway and the Rome–Capranica–Viterbo railway. The old station continued to operate until 1950 as a goods yard and rolling stock workshop. Its site is now occupied by the FS Experimental Institute.

In recent years, the present station has been the subject of renovations and improvements commissioned by Centostazioni.

== Features ==
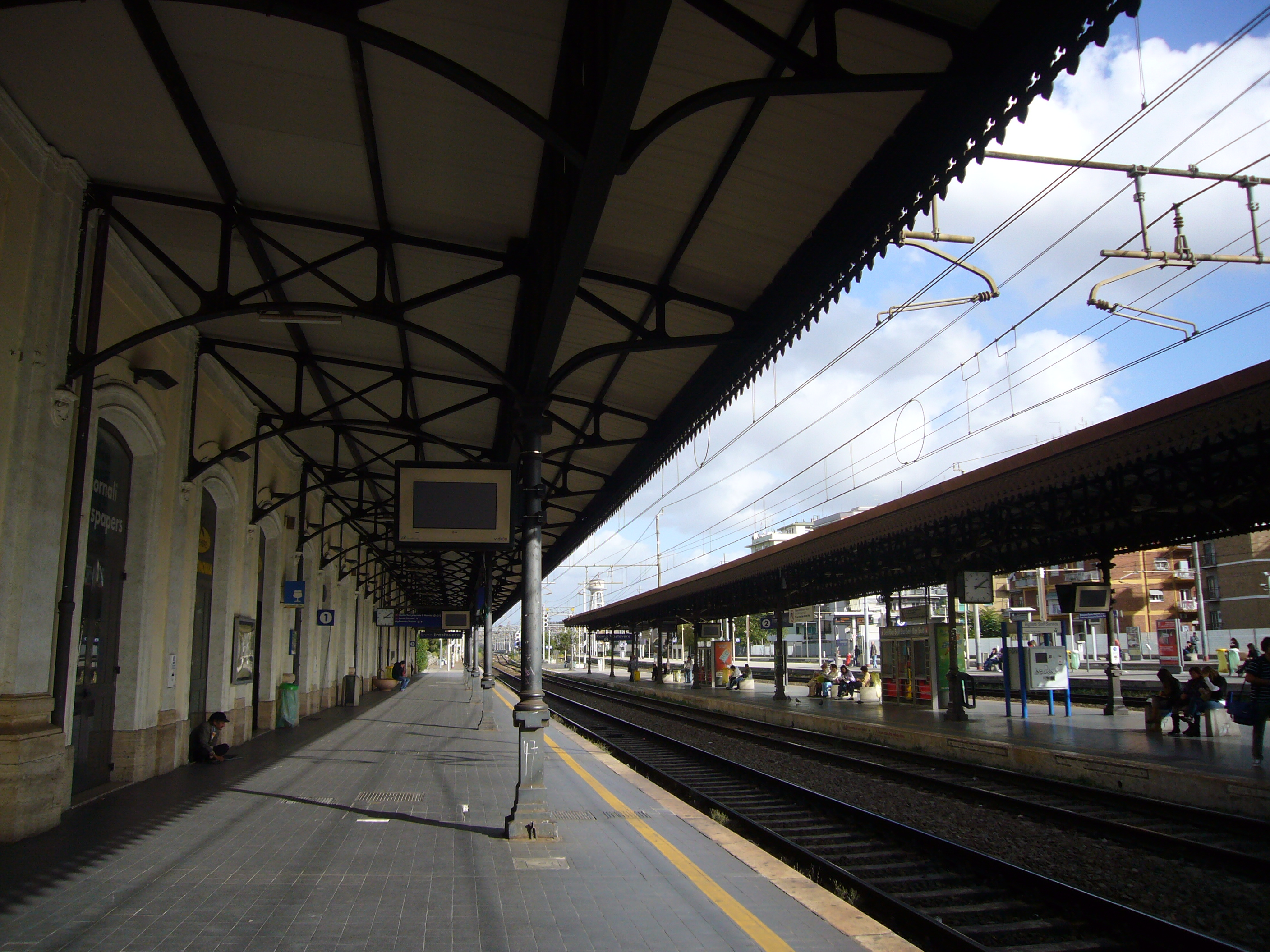
View of the platforms

Roma Trastevere's passenger building was designed by Paolo Bo. It is a large structure made up of several conjoined sections, ranging from two to four storeys in height. The ground floor level of the central section provides various facilities to passengers.

The station has six through tracks faced by platforms fitted with shelters and connected by a subway. Operationally, it was previously classified as a junction station, but in 1990 it was downgraded to the status of a stopping point.

Today, the Ferrovie regionali del Lazio FR1, FR3 and FR5 commuter lines all pass through the station, which is also planned to be an interchange with the proposed Line D of the Metropolitana di Roma.

== See also ==
- History of rail transport in Italy
- List of railway stations in Lazio
- Rail transport in Italy
- Railway stations in Italy

Preceding station	Lazio regional railways	Following station
Roma Ostiense towards Orte	FL1	Villa Bonelli towards Fiumicino Aeroporto
Roma Ostiense Terminus	FL3	Quattro Venti towards Viterbo Porta Fiorentina
Roma Ostiense towards Roma Termini	FL5	Roma San Pietro towards Civitavecchia
