= Quattro Venti railway station =

Fl3 station in rome

Quattro Venti
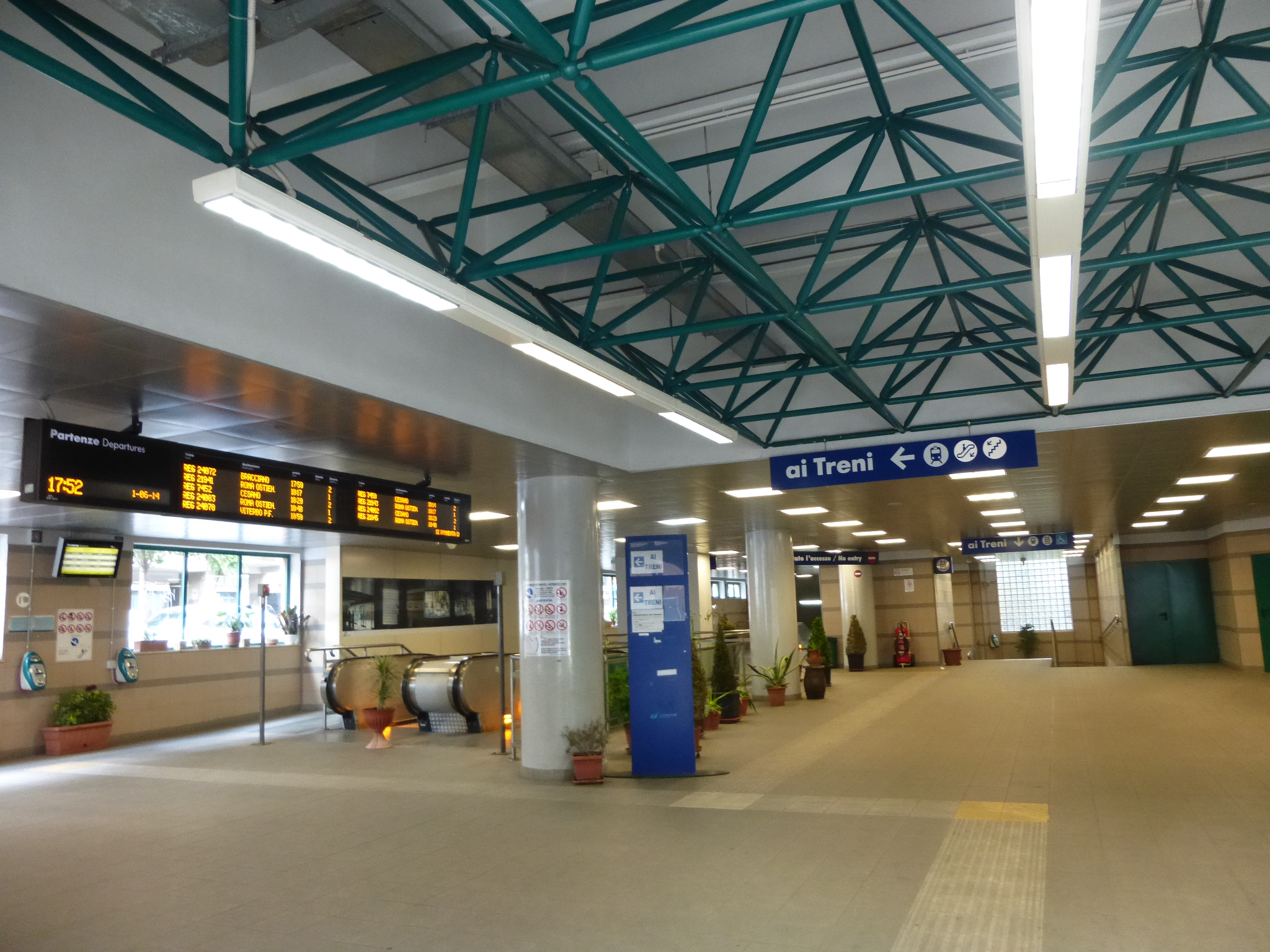

General information
- Location: Viale dei Quattro Venti, Rome
- Coordinates: 41°52′43″N 12°27′31″E
- Owner: Rete Ferroviaria Italiana S.p.A. (RFI)
- Line: FL3
- Tracks: 2

Construction
- Structure type: Underground
- Depth: ca. 65 m
- Parking: Interchange
- Accessible: Yes

Other information
- Fare zone: Urban

History
- Opened: 15 October 2006

Services
Location
- Click on the map for a fullscreen view

Quattro Venti is a railway station of Rome, located in the district of Monteverde, between the stations of Roma Trastevere and Roma San Pietro.

The management of the facilities is entrusted to Rete Ferroviaria Italiana, a company of the Ferrovie dello Stato group, which classifies the station in the "Silver" category.

== Overview ==
It is served by trains of the FR3 line, forming an intermediate stop between Trastevere railway station and San Pietro railway station. The station is located between Viale dei Quattro Venti and Via Antonio Cesari, at the foot of the Janiculum hill.

The station opened on 15 October 2006. It is the deepest non-subway railway station in Europe.

== Interchanges ==
ATAC bus stop

== Services ==
On weekdays, the following frequencies are offered:

- 4 trains per hour for Roma Ostiense railway station
- 4 trains per hour to Cesano,
  - of which 1 continues to Bracciano
  - and 1 to Bracciano and Viterbo

Sundays and holidays see a diminished service.

Preceding station	Lazio regional railways	Following station
Roma Trastevere towards Roma Ostiense	FL3	Roma San Pietro towards Viterbo Porta Fiorentina
