= Rome–Civitavecchia railway =

Railway line in Italy

The Rome–Civitavecchia railway line is one of the oldest railways in Italy, constructed in what was then the Papal States, opening in 1859 and is 72.6 km long. The line now forms part of the Pisa–Rome line.

== History ==
=== Construction ===
The railway was built by the Società Pio Central (Italian for Central Pius Company), named in honour of Pope Pius IX, who had overturned the Vatican's previous opposition to innovations such as railways in the Papal States. It was headed by the haulage contractor Mr. Hubert Debrousse, a French engineer, and 950 workers were engaged on 27 railway work sites. Work commenced in October 1856 and in thirty months the railway and two stations were built between the Porta Portese station in Rome, near the current Roma Trastevere station and a temporary station at Civitavecchia.

=== Opening ===
The line was opened for service on 24 April 1859, with two trips a day from Rome and two trips a day from Civitavecchia, with a journey time of 2½ hours. In 1860 the railway was absorbed into the Società per le Strade Ferrate Romane.

=== Rolling stock ===
The railway equipment consisted of eleven French steam locomotives (built by Cail & C. of Paris), one English steam locomotive, 21 first class passenger carriages and 25 second class passenger carriages. The rails were built by Losh, Wilson and Bell of Newcastle, England.

=== Extensions ===
On 2 July 1860 the permanent Civitavecchia station opened for service and construction began on the section of the line from Civitavecchia to the Papal States' northern border with Tuscany, which was inaugurated and opened for service on 22 June 1867. On 22 October 1863, the line was extended south over the Tiber on a lift bridge—built out of cast iron and prefabricated in England—in order to connect with the new Roma Termini station.
