= Roma San Pietro railway station =

Italian train stop, nearest to the Vatican

Roma San Pietro
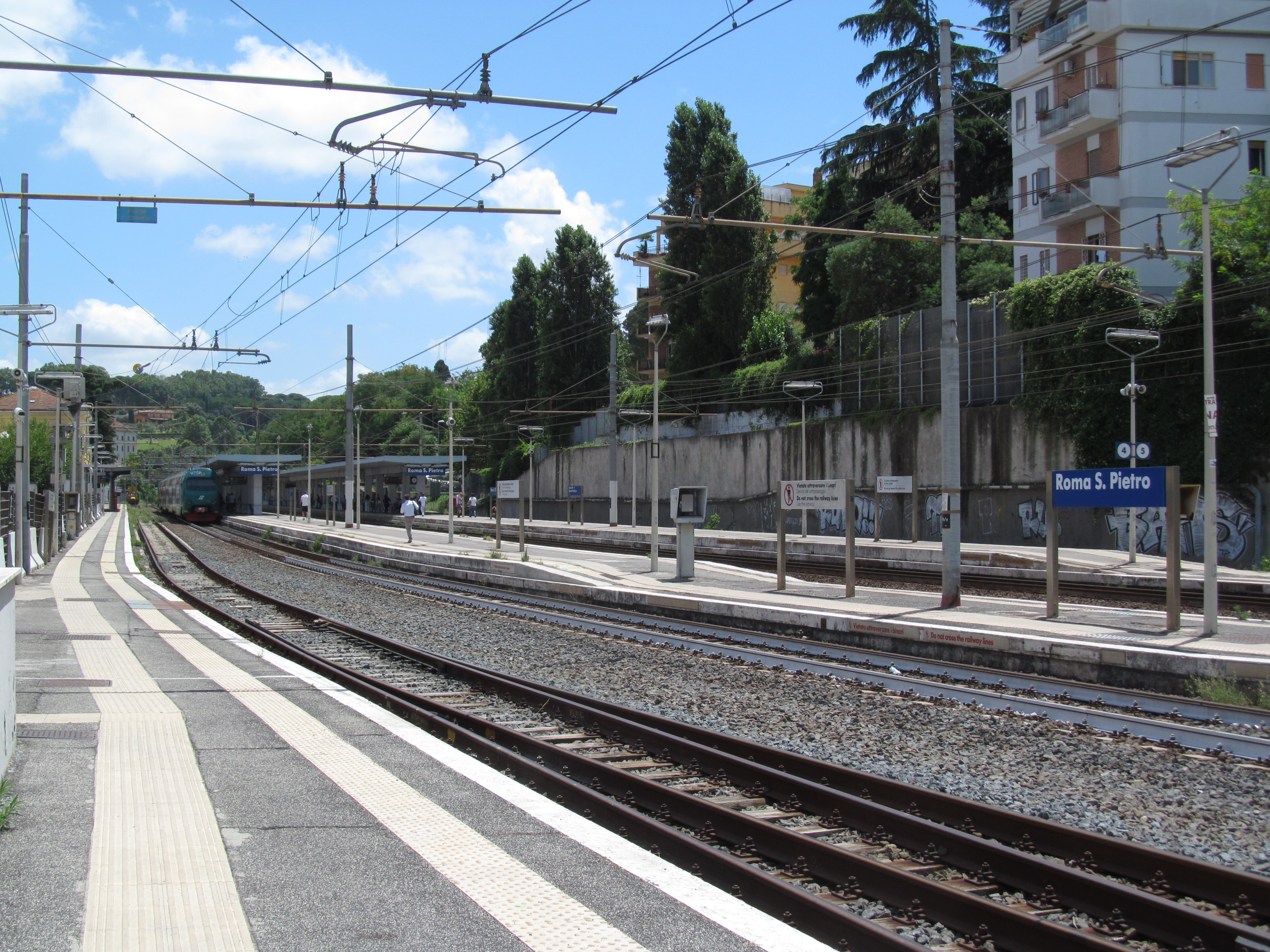
- The station platforms.

General information
- Location: Piazza della Stazione di San Pietro; 00165 Roma RM; Rome, Rome, Lazio; Italy
- Coordinates: 41°53′47″N 12°27′16″E
- Operator: Rete Ferroviaria Italiana
- Lines: Roma–Città del Vaticano; Pisa–Livorno–Roma; Roma Tiburtina-Viterbo; Roma Termini-Civitavecchia
- Distance: 11.542 km (7.172 mi) from Roma Termini
- Platforms: 5
- Train operators: Trenitalia
- Connections: ATAC buses

Other information
- Classification: Gold

History
- Opened: 29 April 1894; 132 years ago
Location
- Click on the map for a fullscreen view

Roma San Pietro railway station (Italian: Stazione di Roma San Pietro) is a major station serving the city and comune of Rome, Italy. Opened in 1894, the station forms part of the Pisa–Livorno–Rome railway. It is also the junction for the short, single track Rome–Vatican City railway, which crosses into Vatican City after passing over a viaduct.

The station is currently managed by Rete Ferroviaria Italiana (RFI). Train services are operated by Trenitalia. Each of these companies is a subsidiary of Ferrovie dello Stato (FS), Italy's state-owned rail company.

== Location ==
Roma San Pietro railway station is situated at Piazza della Stazione di San Pietro, west of the city centre, and a short distance to the south of Vatican City; the station owes its name to its proximity to St. Peter's Basilica in the Vatican (just 300 m (980 ft) away).

== History ==
Opened along the line to Viterbo on 29 April 1894, the station, before structural changes to its "country station" features, was one of the favourite locations of the world of cinema. Many of the greatest actors and directors shot a scene in the station or in the forecourt, including Totò, Sordi, Virna Lisi, Buzzanca and many others extending back to the black and white era of film.

At that time, the station consisted of two through tracks passing a small passenger building. Although the station was then situated on a secondary line, the passenger traffic, consisting largely of pilgrims, was notable.

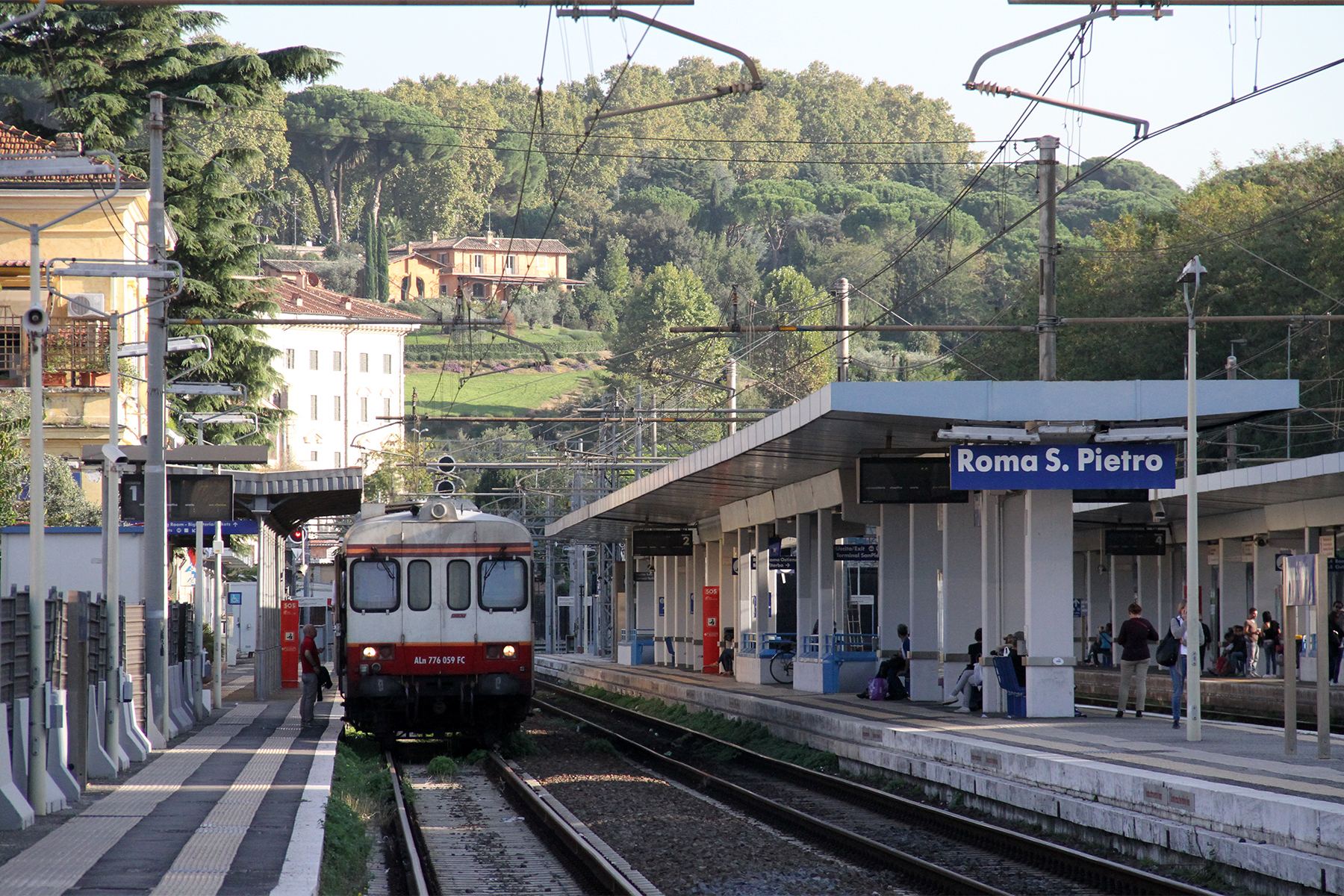
View of the station yard, 2012

With the construction in 1990 of the new Maccarese–Roma section of the Pisa–Livorno–Rome railway (Maccarese-Fregene – Roma Aurelia – Roma San Pietro – Roma Trastevere), the station underwent significant changes: the number of through tracks was increased to 6, the line was electrified and a pedestrian underpass was built.

To coincide with the Great Jubilee of 2000, and the simultaneous re-opening of the line to Viterbo, the platforms were erected and two lifts installed.

Between 2000 and 2006, prior to the opening of the tunnel to Roma Ostiense, Roma San Pietro was the terminus of half the trains from Cesano and Viterbo.

== Features ==
The station has a passenger building, which houses the waiting area, ticketing booths, ticket machines, a bar, a kiosk and toilets.

Five through tracks pass through the station yard.

== Passenger and train movements ==
All regional trains bound for Bracciano, Cesano di Roma, Civitavecchia, Grosseto, Pisa Centrale, Roma Termini and Viterbo Porta Fiorentina stop at the station.

The typical offering in off-peak hours on working days is a train every 15 minutes for Roma Ostiense and Cesano, a train every 30 minutes to Bracciano, Civitavecchia and Roma Termini, a train every hour to Grosseto and Viterbo Porta Fiorentina and a train every two hours to Pisa Centrale.

Ferrovie regionali del Lazio FR3 and FR5 commuter lines also pass through the station.

== See also ==
- History of rail transport in Italy
- List of railway stations in Lazio
- Rail transport in Italy
- Railway stations in Italy

Preceding station	Lazio regional railways	Following station
Quattro Venti towards Roma Ostiense	FL3	Valle Aurelia towards Viterbo Porta Fiorentina
Roma Trastevere towards Roma Termini	FL5	Roma Aurelia towards Civitavecchia
