= Civitavecchia railway station =

Railway station in Lazio, Italy

Civitavecchia
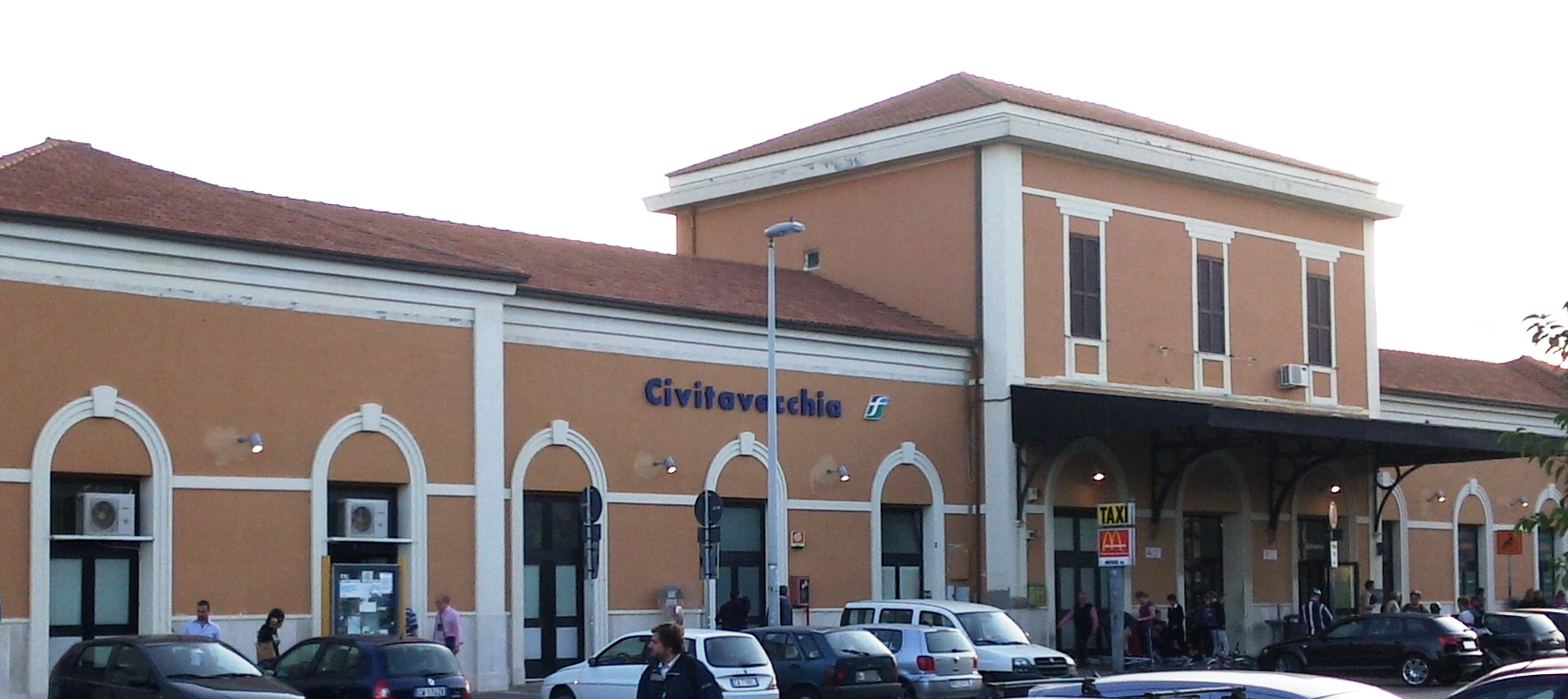
- View of the passenger building.

General information
- Location: Viale della Repubblica; 00053 Civitavecchia RM; Civitavecchia, Rome, Lazio; Italy
- Coordinates: 42°05′18″N 11°47′53″E
- Operator: Rete Ferroviaria Italiana; Centostazioni
- Lines: Pisa–Livorno–Rome; Roma Termini-Civitavecchia
- Distance: 80.678 km (50.131 mi) from Roma Termini
- Train operators: Trenitalia
- Connections: Urban and suburban buses; Barcelona Toulon Corsica Sardinia Sicily Valletta

Other information
- Classification: Gold

History
- Opened: 24 April 1859; 167 years ago
Location
- Location within Lazio Location within Italy

Civitavecchia railway station (Italian: Stazione di Civitavecchia) serves the town and comune of Civitavecchia, the sea port for Rome, in the region of Lazio, central Italy. Opened in 1859, it forms part of the Pisa–Livorno–Rome railway.

The station is currently managed by Rete Ferroviaria Italiana (RFI). However, the commercial area of the passenger building is managed by Centostazioni. Train services are operated by Trenitalia. Each of these companies is a subsidiary of Ferrovie dello Stato Italiane (FS), Italy's state-owned rail company.

== Location ==
Civitavecchia railway station is situated in Viale della Repubblica, a short distance to the southeast of both the town centre and the main entrance to the port.

== History ==
The station was opened on 24 April 1859, upon the inauguration of the Rome–Civitavecchia section of the Pisa–Livorno–Rome railway. The original, temporary, station facilities were replaced on 2 July 1860, when the permanent station was placed into service. On 27 June 1867, Civitavecchia ceased to be a terminus, when the line was extended to the north, as far as Nunziatella, on the border between the Papal States and Tuscany.

Between 1928 and 1961, Civitavecchia was the junction for a branch line to Orte. That line is currently disused, but in September 2010 a contract was let for its reconstruction.

== Features ==
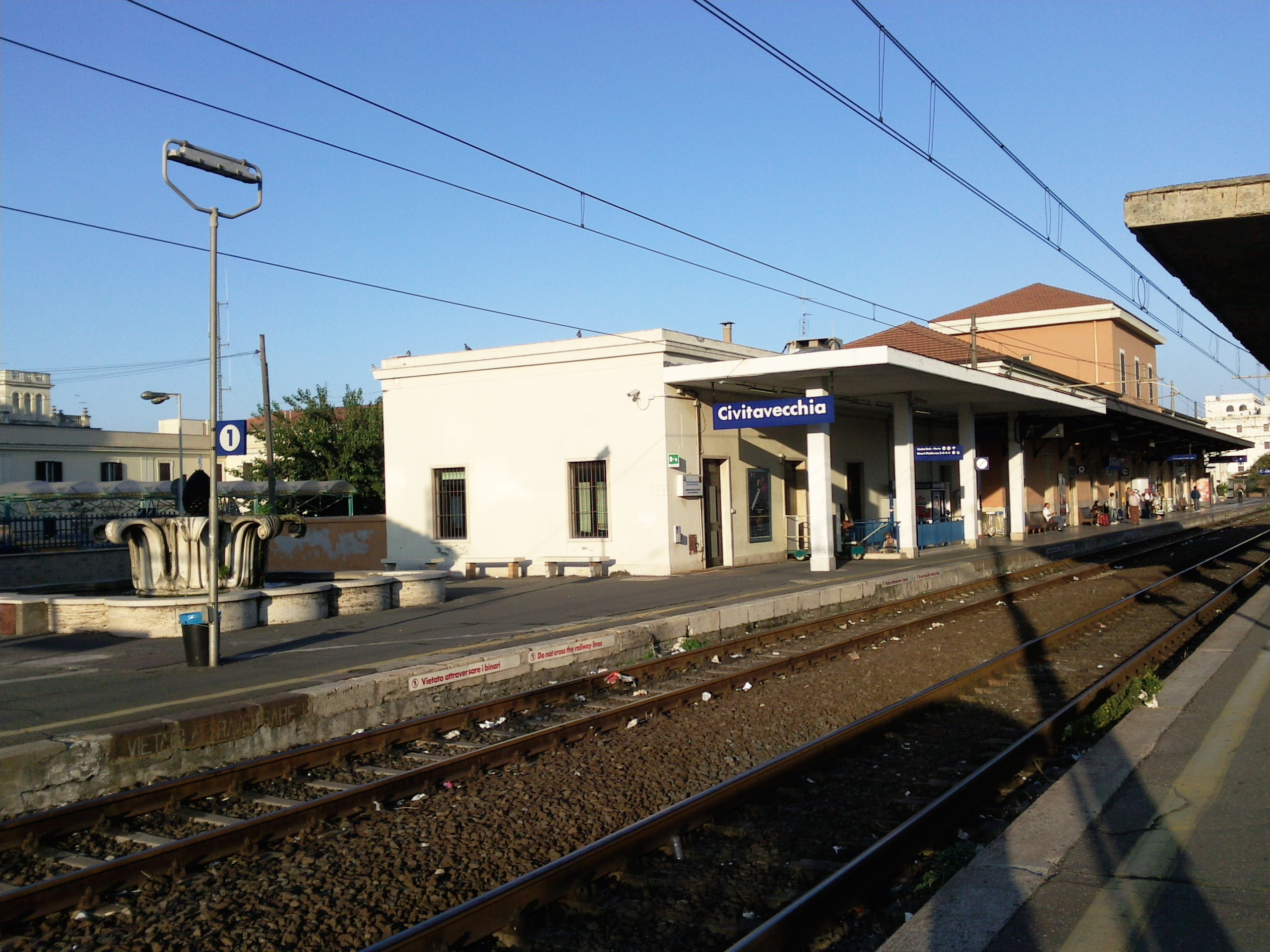
View of the main platform

Civitavecchia's passenger building is a mostly single storey structure, with a double storey central section. It houses ticket offices and a waiting room.

The station has four through tracks, and two terminating tracks, with platforms for passengers. The platforms are linked by an underpass. There is also a freight yard.

Further north are offices, a storage area for locomotives, and Civitavecchia Porto Tarquina, where wagons are repaired.

To the south was once a goods line, now abandoned, which branched off from the station towards the port. It has been replaced by a paved area now used as a parking lot.

== Passenger and train movements ==
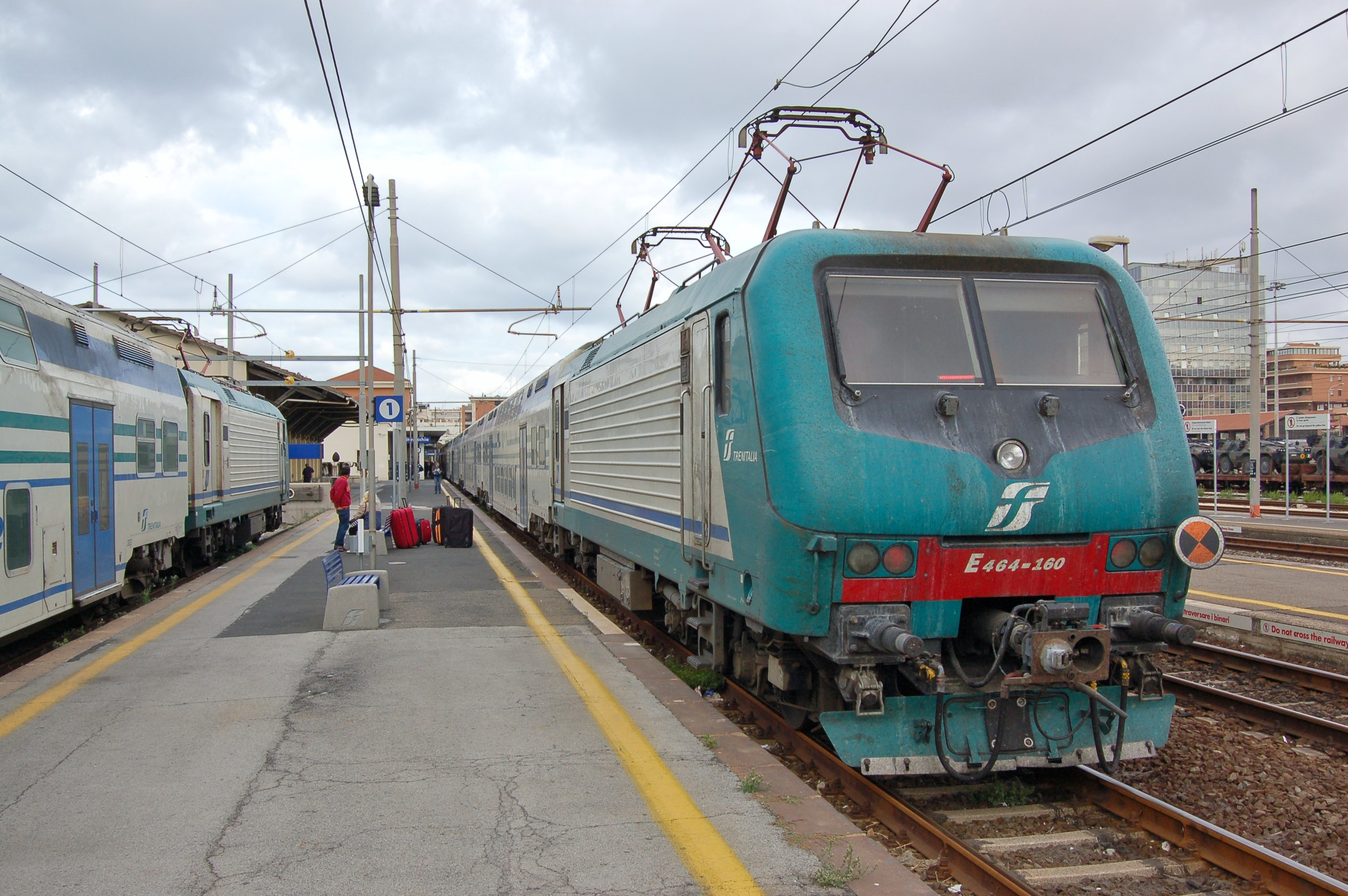
An E464 class locomotive with a commuter train of the FL5 at Civitavecchia

The station has about 3.2 million passenger movements each year.

All InterCity, Eurostar City trains passing through the station stop there, as do a pair of InterCity Notte trains (InterCity Night). The station is occasionally a stop or terminus for the Express train UNITALSI, a train of pilgrims.

Very frequent regional trains link Civitavecchia with nearby destinations, including Rome, Grosseto, Montalto di Castro and Pisa.

The station is also the terminus of the FL5 commuter service from Rome.

== See also ==
- History of rail transport in Italy
- List of railway stations in Lazio
- Rail transport in Italy
- Railway stations in Italy

Preceding station	Lazio regional railways	Following station
Santa Marinella towards Roma Termini	FL5	Terminus
