= Vatican Railway =

Railway in Vatican City and Italy

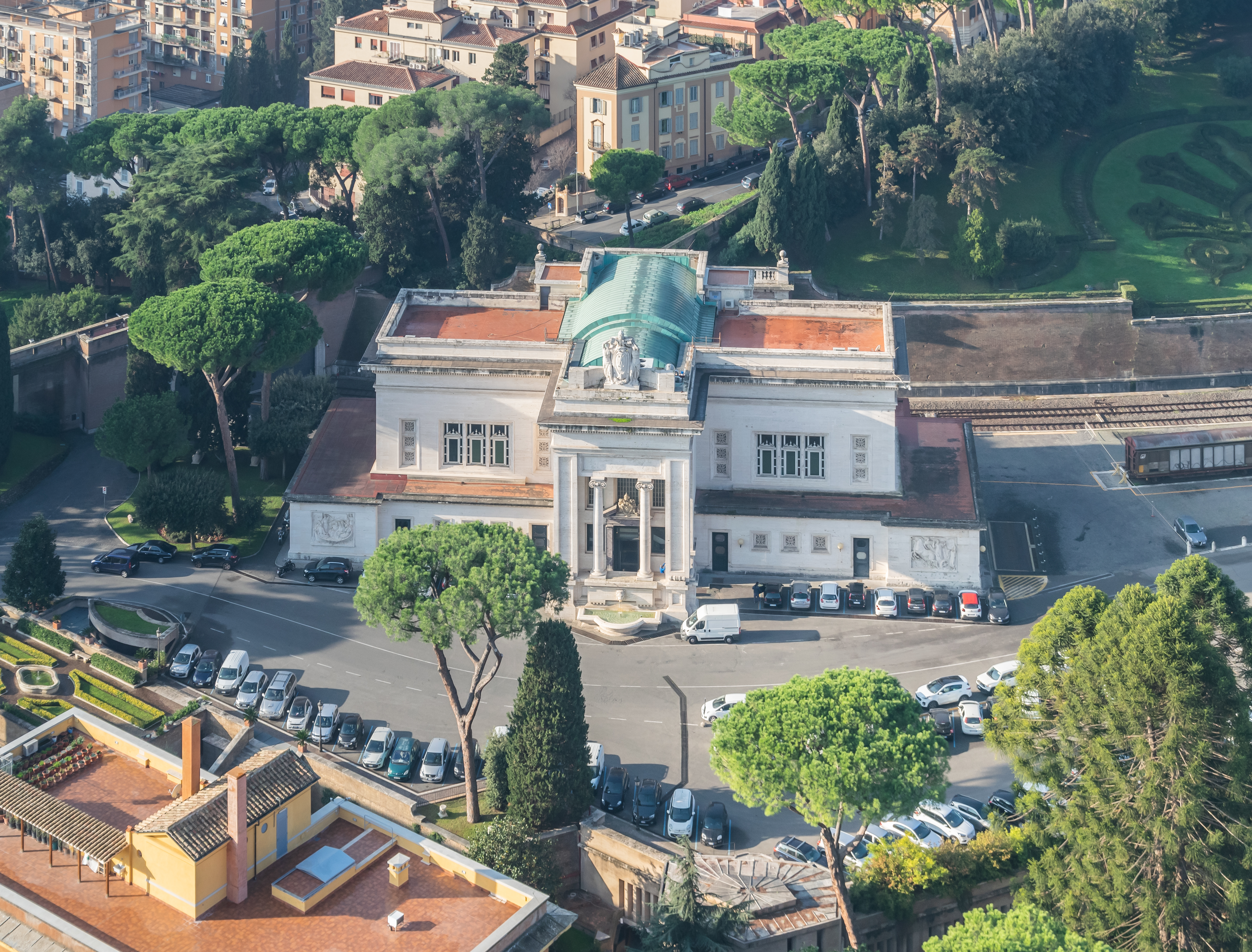
- The station viewed from St Peter's Basilica

Overview
- Native name: Ferrovia Vaticana
- Status: Operational
- Owner: Holy See
- Locale: Vatican City and Italy
- Termini: Roma San Pietro 41.8962°N 12.4547°E; Vatican City 41.9010°N 12.4512°E
- Stations: 1

Service
- System: Holy See railway
- Operator: Ferrovie dello Stato

History
- Opened: 1934

Technical
- Line length: Total: 1.27 kilometres (0.79 mi); In Vatican City: 0.3 kilometres (0.19 mi)
- Number of tracks: 1–2
- Track gauge: 1,435 mm (4 ft 8 1/2 in) standard gauge
- Electrification: Italy: 3000V DC; Vatican City: none
- Highest elevation: 38 metres (125 ft)
Route map

The Vatican Railway (Italian: Ferrovia Vaticana) is a 1.27-kilometre (0.79 mi) railway connecting its only station, Vatican City, (Italian: Stazione Vaticana [statˈtsjoːne vatiˈkaːna] or Città del Vaticano [tʃitˈta ddel vatiˈkaːno]) to the Italian railway network. The section of the line within Vatican City comprises only one station and 300 metres (980 ft) of track, making it the shortest national railway system in the world. The station has two platforms and four tracks, of which one platform and track must use a headshunt in a tunnel to the north-west of the station to reverse towards Italy. An iron gate in the city walls separate the Vatican City and Italian sections, and the gate is only opened for trains to pass through. On the Italian side, trains pass over the Gelsomino Viaduct to reach Roma San Pietro railway station.

Having previously been excluded from the Italian railway network, Vatican City access to Italy's rail system was guaranteed in the Lateran Treaty of 1929, and was constructed under Pope Pius XI, who demanded a grand station building be constructed to remain in keeping with the city. The line and station were in use by 1934 but no pope used it until Pope John XXIII in 1962. By the time the papal plane could be used for long-distance travel, the railway was not useful for papal transport and was used only for bringing freight into Vatican City from Italy and occasional use for pilgrimages.

Starting in 2015 to coincide with Pope Francis' opening of the Palace of Castel Gandolfo, tourist services have been running from Vatican City to the palace once a week, the first regular tourist use of the railway. The service is run jointly by Vatican Museums and the Italian railway, using Trenitalia rolling stock—Vatican City has never had rolling stock of its own. The journey time is approximately an hour, of which only 30 seconds is within the Vatican City section.

== History ==
=== Before 1934: Background and construction ===
Pope Gregory XVI (died 1846) prevented the construction of railways in the Papal States, and was reputed to have said "chemin de fer, chemin d'enfer" ("road of iron, road of hell"). Gregory XVI's successor, Pope Pius IX, began the construction of a rail line from Bologna to Ancona but the territory was seized by the armies of the Kingdom of Sardinia in 1860 before it was completed. The utility of rail travel for the mass pilgrimages of the 19th century, beginning with those at Lourdes circa 1858, was one factor that softened opposition to such technology within the Roman Curia.

The construction of a railway station in Vatican City and its linkage to the Italian rail lines was guaranteed by Article 6 of the Lateran Treaty of 11 February 1929. Whereas Vatican City had previously been excluded from the Italian railway network, its trains would now be allowed to run over Italian tracks. The Directorate of New Railway Construction of the Ministry of Public Works of the Kingdom of Italy implemented this provision with construction beginning on 3 April 1929, to establish earthworks 38 m above sea level (the height of the Roma San Pietro railway station) between Piazza Santa Marta and the Governor's Palace, Vatican. The construction of the viaduct leading to Vatican City was paid for by the Italian government; the station within Vatican City was financed from the ₤750 million indemnity agreed to in the Lateran Treaty's financial section. The total cost of construction was ₤24 million.

Under the orders of Pope Pius XI, a grand marble station building was constructed in 1929–1933. The first locomotive entered Vatican City in March 1932, and after it had been subjected to heavy rail testing, Railway Age reported the railway complete on 7 May 1932. At the time, it was planned for services to begin in June 1932, and no decision had been reached as to whether it would be usable by non-citizens. The station was opened officially on 2 October 1934; it would not be used by the pope until 1962 and tourists until 2015. Pope Pius XI died in February 1939, having never travelled on the line built under his orders.

=== 1935–present: Operational history ===
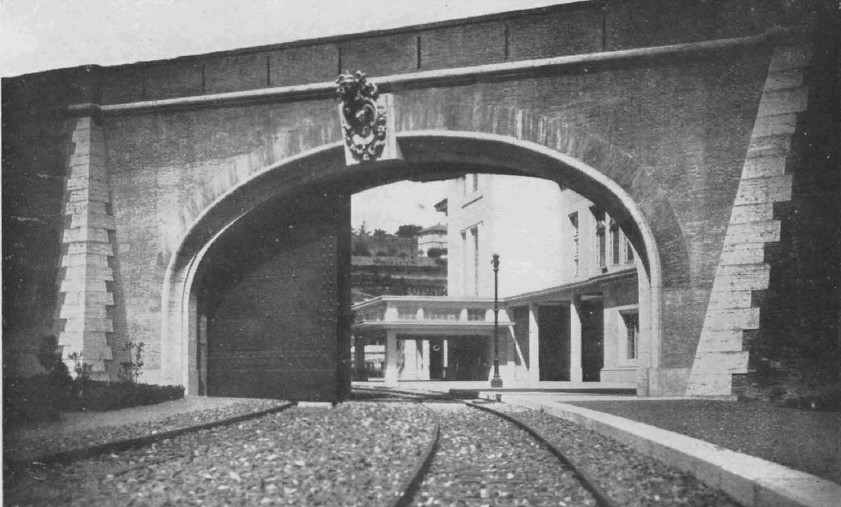
The sliding-door gateway into Vatican City in 1934

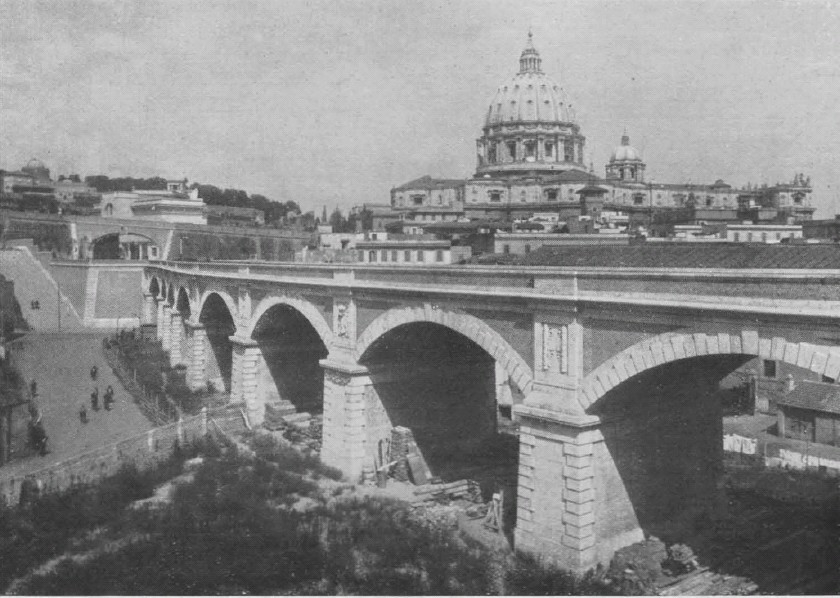
The eight-span viaduct carrying the Vatican Railway over the Gelsomino Valley in 1934

On 5 November 1943, a plane dropped five bombs into Vatican City in the vicinity of the station, of which four exploded. The first of these bombs landed close to the railway station, which suffered damage. Other bombs damaged the adjacent mosaic studio and smashed windows of St Peter's Basilica. All countries accused of responsibility denied the bombing. In late March 1944, during the allied bombing of Rome in World War II, Vatican City discovered a German munitions train parked on the line by the Vatican City railway station.

Pope John XXIII, on 4 October 1962, became the first pope to use the Vatican railway during his pilgrimage to Loreto and Assisi one week before the beginning of Second Vatican Council using the Italian presidential train; the trip was broadcast on the Eurovision Network. Prior to John's trip in 1962, Pope Pius IX had been both the last pope to visit Loreto (as the head of the Papal States) and the last pope to travel by train. John XXIII also arranged for the major relics of Pope Pius X to be transferred to Venice using the Vatican railway.

Pope John Paul II used the railway a few times for symbolic purposes, as early as 8 November 1979, but did not use the railway to leave Rome until 24 January 2002. On 21 May 2011, a special train ran from Vatican City station to commemorate the 60th anniversary of Caritas. Pope Benedict XVI used the railway for a pilgrimage to Assisi on 27 October 2011. On 18 April 2013, the Turin Group of Train Friends (Gruppo Amici del Treno Torino) departed on a railtour from Roma Ostiense railway station to Vatican City station; the railtour used two ALn 776 rail cars belonging to Seatrain.

FS Class 625 steam locomotive 625 017 at the Vatican on 11 September 2015, transporting invited members of the press to Castel Gandolfo

In September 2015, the Palace of Castel Gandolfo opened to the public for the first time under the orders of Pope Francis, who wanted to share the Church's treasures with the public; a museum was opened at the castle at the same time. To coincide with this, a special weekly service began between Vatican City railway station and Castel Gandolfo, which is about 32 kilometres (20 mi) south-east of Vatican City. A special train for invited guests and media reporters inaugurated the run on 11 September 2015. This inaugural train was hauled by FS Class 625 steam locomotive 625-017, built in 1915. The same engine was used by the Italian royal family, and also hauled the train which carried Pope John XXIII to Loreto and Assisi in 1962. The locomotive was joined to restored wooden coaches, and the service was the first to allow tourists to use the railway since its inception. Regular services instead use a Ferrovie dello Stato Italiane diesel train. The service is officially a collaborative provision of the Vatican Museums and the Italian railway, with journey times of approximately an hour in each direction.

== Railway station ==
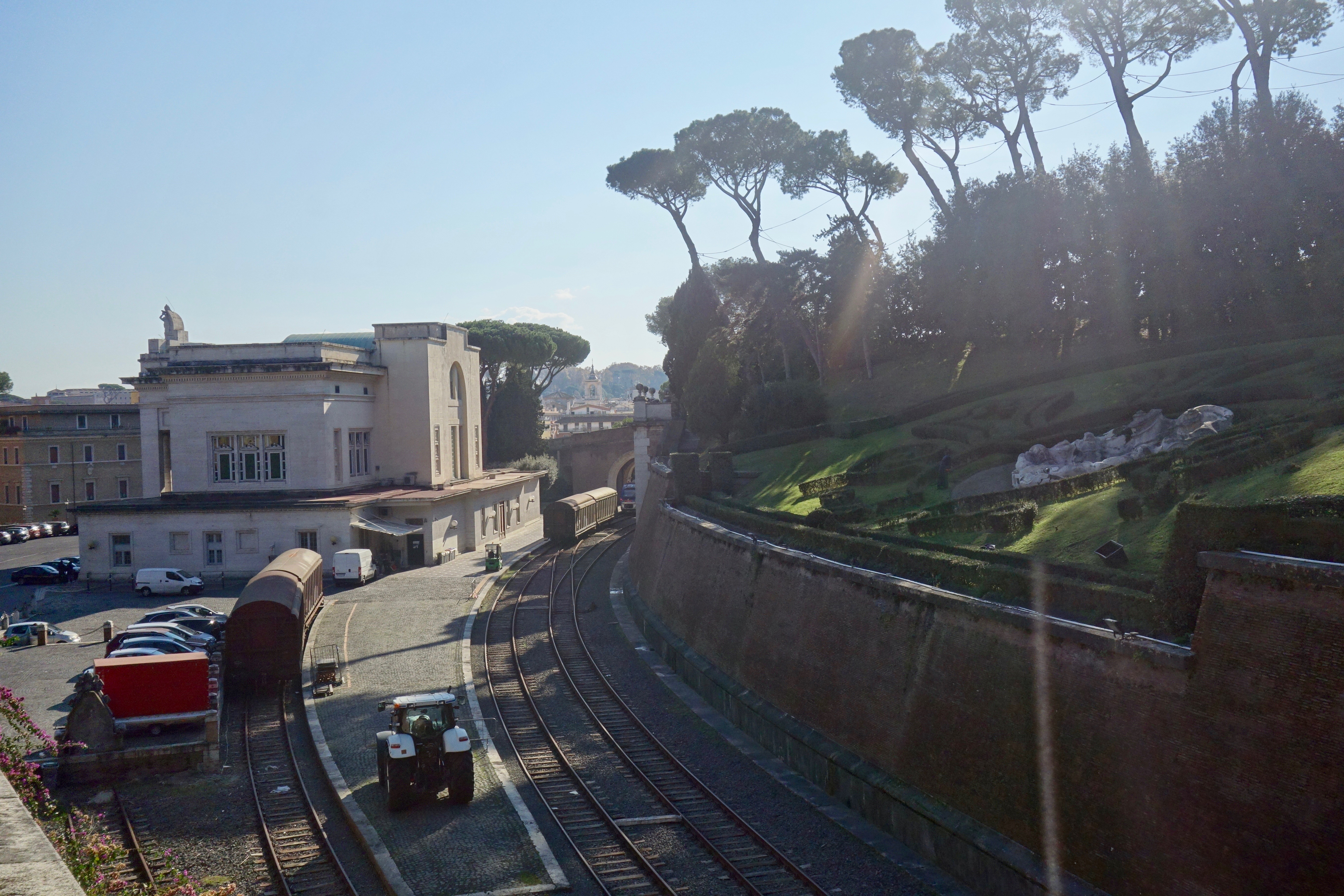
The station building and its island platform

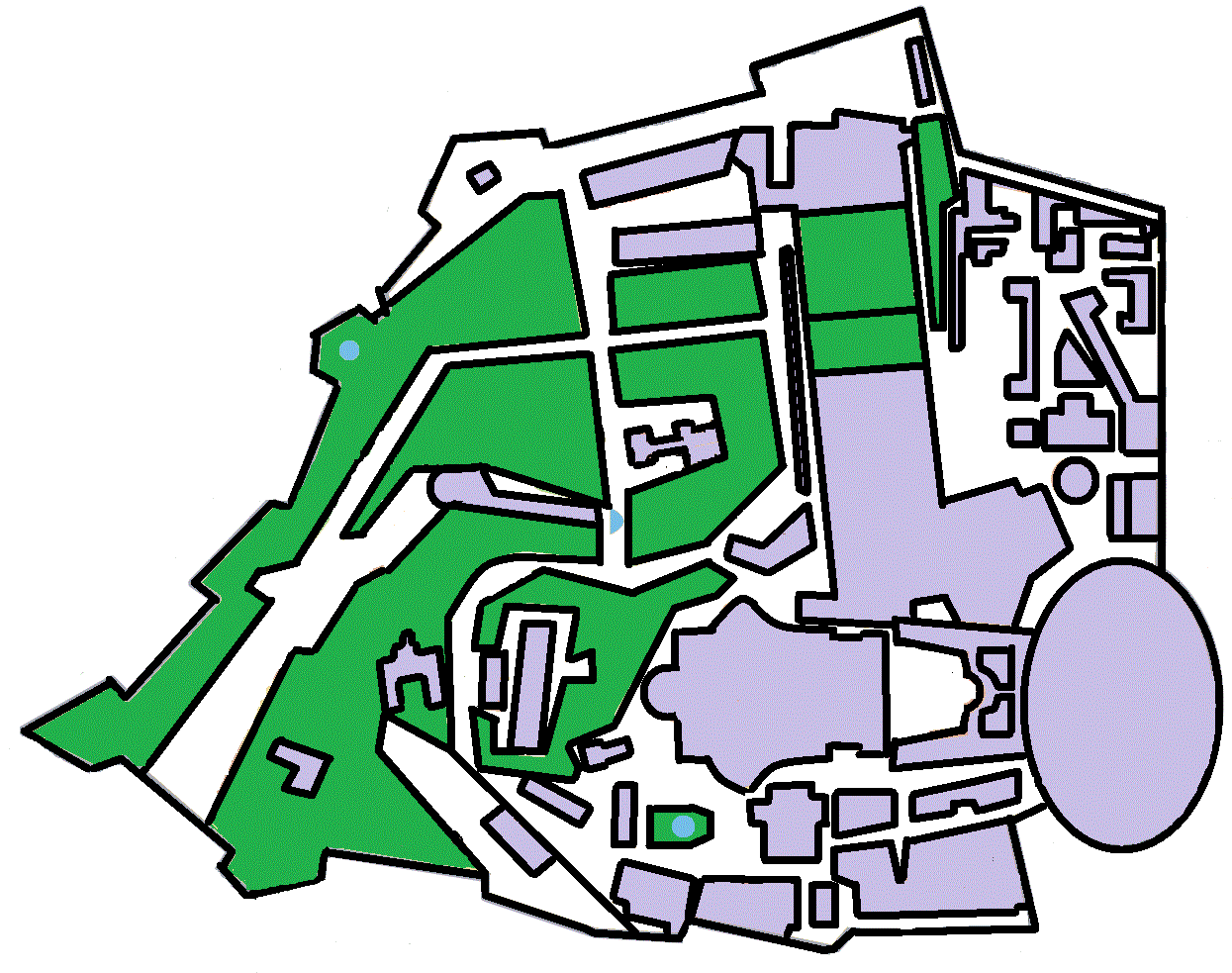
Vatican City Railway Station within Vatican City

Vatican City railway station (Italian: Stazione Città del Vaticano; Stazione Vaticana) is the only railway station in Vatican City. It was built approximately 20 metres (65 ft 7 in) from the Entrance Gateway and designed by architect Giuseppe Momo. Pope Pius XI ordered a grand station building to be constructed for the railway in keeping with the rest of the city; the marble was carved from a single piece, used for both the structure and decorative pillars inside the station. The station was built between 1829 and 1933; Pope Pius XI described it as "the most beautiful station in the world" when he saw it completed. The station is located on the centre-South of the city very close to its southern border with Italy, and is adjacent to the Vatican Mosaic Studio, lying in the shadow of St. Peter's Basilica.

The station building is constructed from white marble with dimensions of 61 by 21.5 metres (200 ft 2 in × 70 ft 6 in). The central body is 16.85 metres (55 ft 3 in) tall and the lateral ones 5.95 metres (19 ft 6 in) tall. Its simple white, Italian marble design was described by writer H. V. Morton as "more like a branch of the Barclay Bank in London". Part of the station was converted to be used as a goods office due to the lack of passengers; the station also houses the small Vatican duty-free department store, a private facility open only to Vatican City residents.

== Infrastructure and route ==
Beginning on the Italian end, the Vatican City State Railway branches off from the Rome–Viterbo line at the Roma San Pietro railway station. It then crosses the Gelsomino Valley on the Gelsomino Viaduct, a 143.12-metre (469 ft 7 in) long stone viaduct with eight 15.30-metre (50 ft 2 in) arches, which bears the fasces and the Savoy coat of arms. The viaduct then crosses Viale Vaticano, which it cuts off, and Via Aurelia. The single-track section of the railway on the Italian side of the border was subsequently fitted with overhead line electrification, the first 100 metres of which is always supplied with 3000 V DC; the remainder of the distance is only energised when needed.

Just before the Italy–Vatican City border, the line passes under an arch decorated with the coat of arms of Pope Pius XI, and a two-piece 35.5-ton iron gate which slides into the recesses of the Vatican walls, which are built from stone. The gate is kept closed when trains are not passing through. Beyond Vatican City railway station, there is a 112-metre (367 ft) straight section before the line ends in a tunnel; this section acts a headshunt, which contains both single- and double-track line. On the far side of the station is the main platform and a passing loop; on the near side are two tracks that run to the headshunt in the tunnel; one is platformed for loading, and the other is for storage.

Though the total length of the railway is approximately 1.27 kilometres (0.79 mi) between the end of the Vatican City tunnel and its junction with the Rome–Viterbo line, only 300 metres (0.19 mi) of it lies within Vatican City; this makes it the shortest national railway in the world. The journey time of a train between the border and terminating at Vatican City railway station is approximately a 1/2-minute.

Pope Pius XI's planned papal train was never constructed, and the Vatican City State has never employed any railway workers or registered any rolling stock. The tourist services are run using a diesel train belonging to Ferrovie dello Stato Italiane, the Italian state operator, by whom the service is operated alongside Vatican Museums. Pius IX's official train from the time of the Papal States remains on display at the Museum of Rome, housed in the Palazzo Braschi.

== Uses ==
Train crossing the viaduct over the Via Aurelia to enter the Vatican

=== Freight ===
The Vatican railway has been used primarily for importing goods. Extensive freight operations were witnessed before road transport became more common and less expensive. Although the volume has decreased, there are still regular freight services into the Vatican. After it ceased being used by the Pope, bringing freight to the Vatican from Rome became its main use until passenger services began in 2015. The railway was used for the transfer of Pope Pius X's relics under Pope John XXIII. While passenger services do now run, the line's main purpose is still for freight deliveries to Vatican City.

=== Passenger transport ===
The railway was formerly used to transport the Pope. After the inauguration of the papal plane, the so-called "Shepherd One", the railway was no longer used for papal transport. The first pope to use the railway was Pope John XXIII in 1962, during a pilgrimage to Loreto and Assisi; the previous pope to travel by train had been Pope Pius IX. Pope John Paul II also used the railway occasionally, and Pope Benedict XVI used it in 2011.

There have been intermittent periods of ordinary passenger train operation into the Vatican, but in contemporary use the Vatican City station has only had regularly scheduled passenger service trains for tourists since 2015. However, only 12 trains had actually run by January 2016. Since the inception of tourist services on 12 September 2015 there has been a weekly special passenger train every Saturday, which is jointly provided by the Vatican Museums and the Italian railway. Visitors to the Vatican Museums are able to board a train which takes them to the Palace of Castel Gandolfo, with journey times of approximately an hour.

== Gallery ==
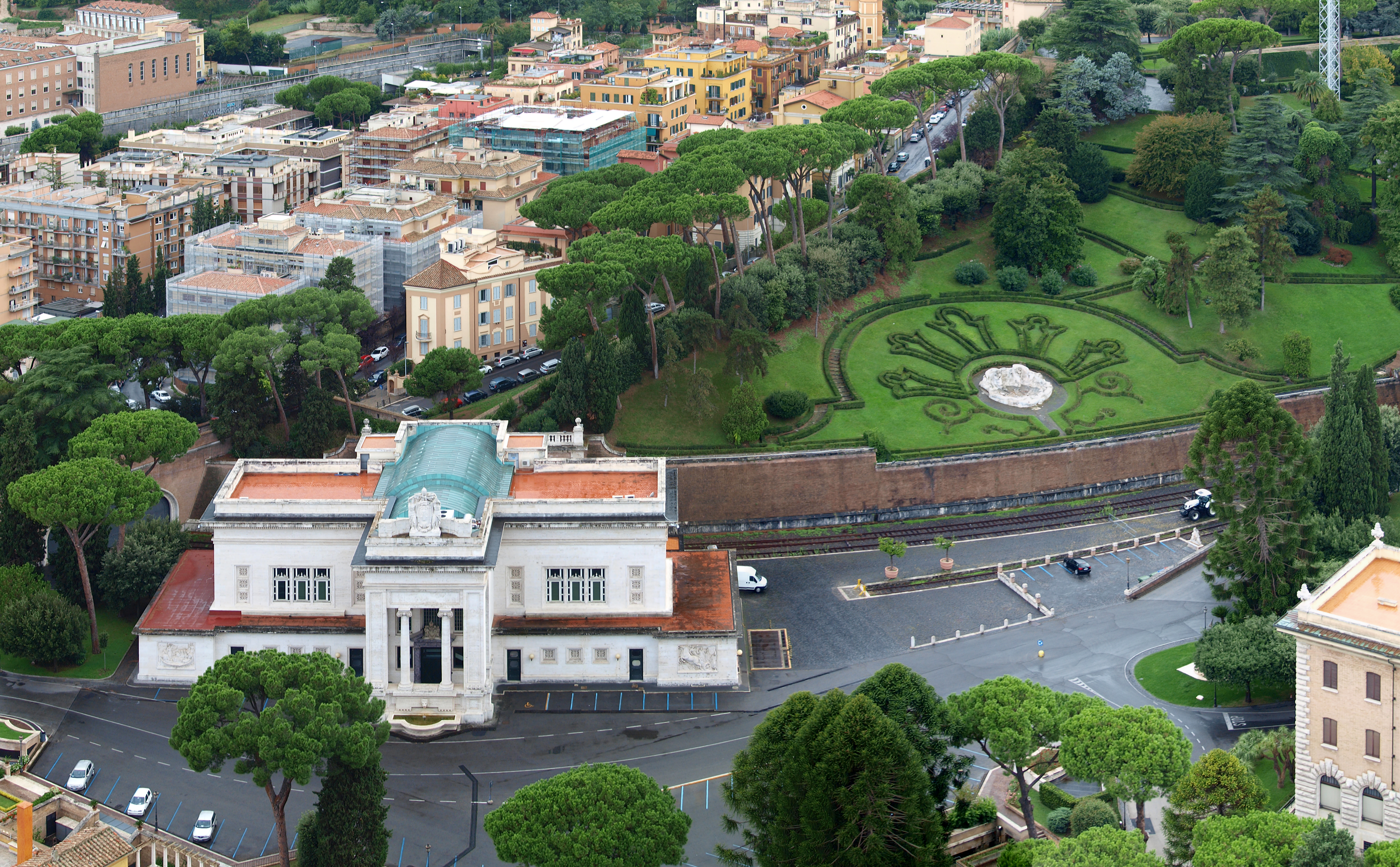
Vatican City railway station, looking westwards

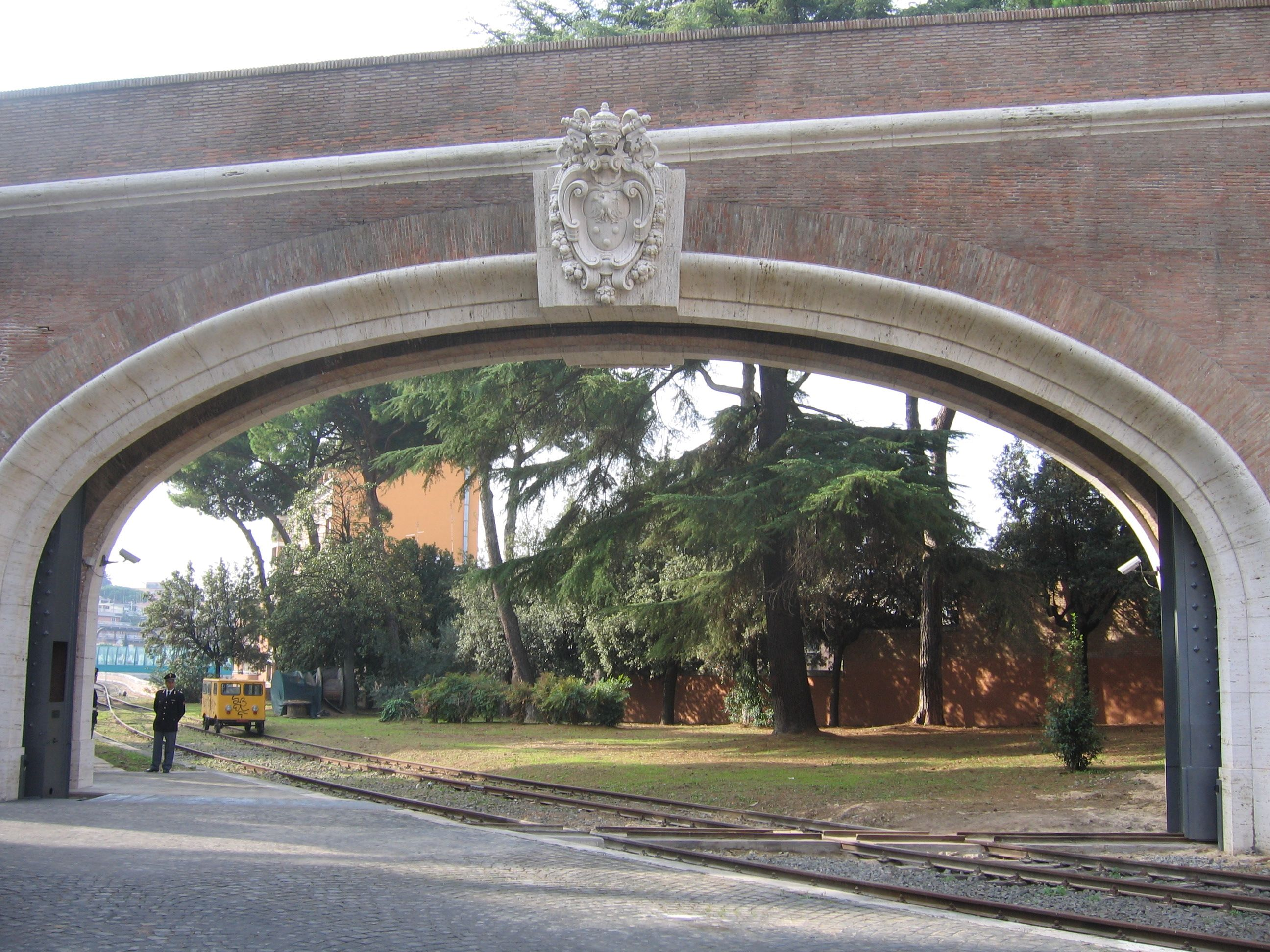
The gateway through Vatican City walls, looking south

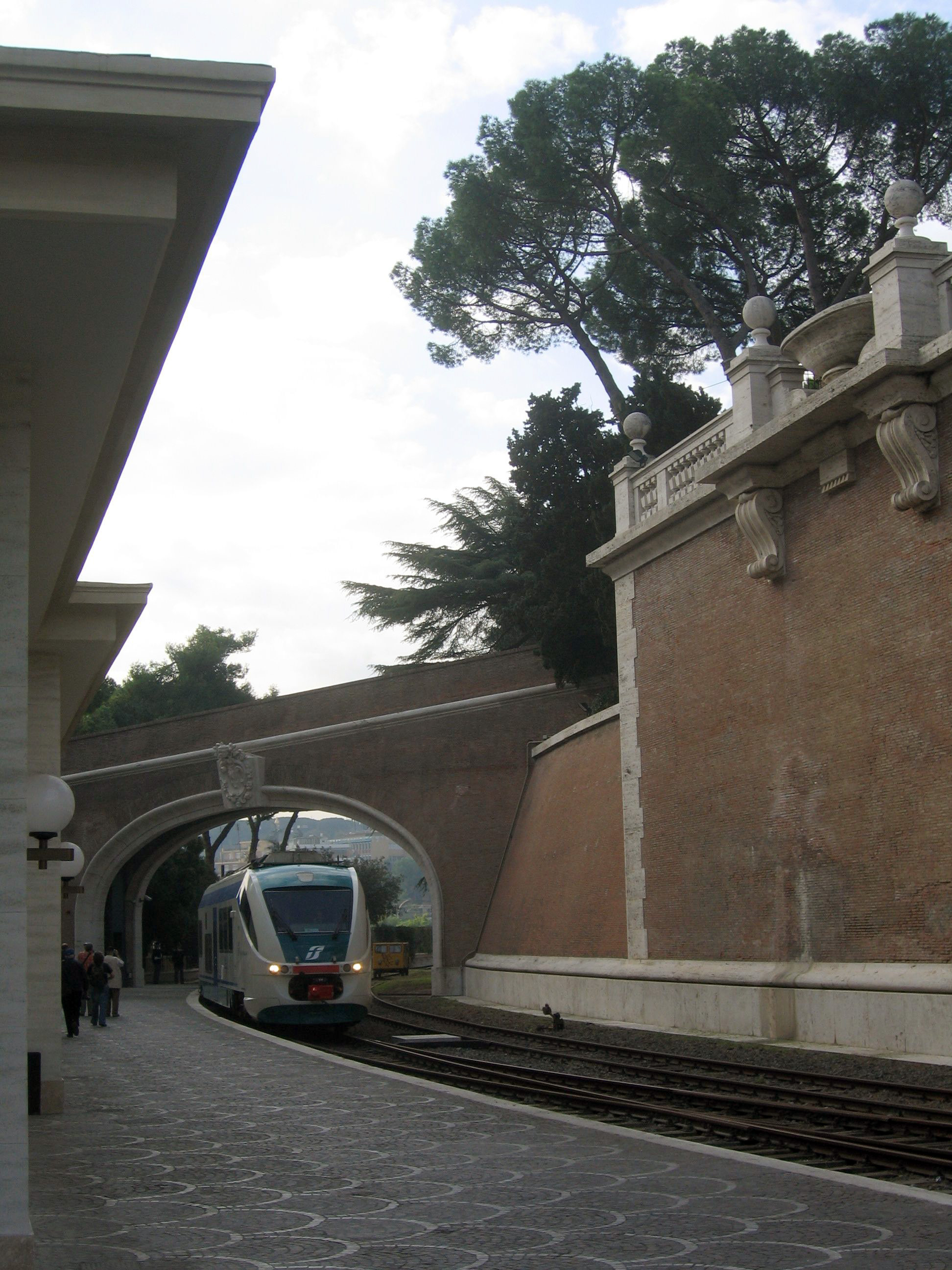
A train entering Vatican City station

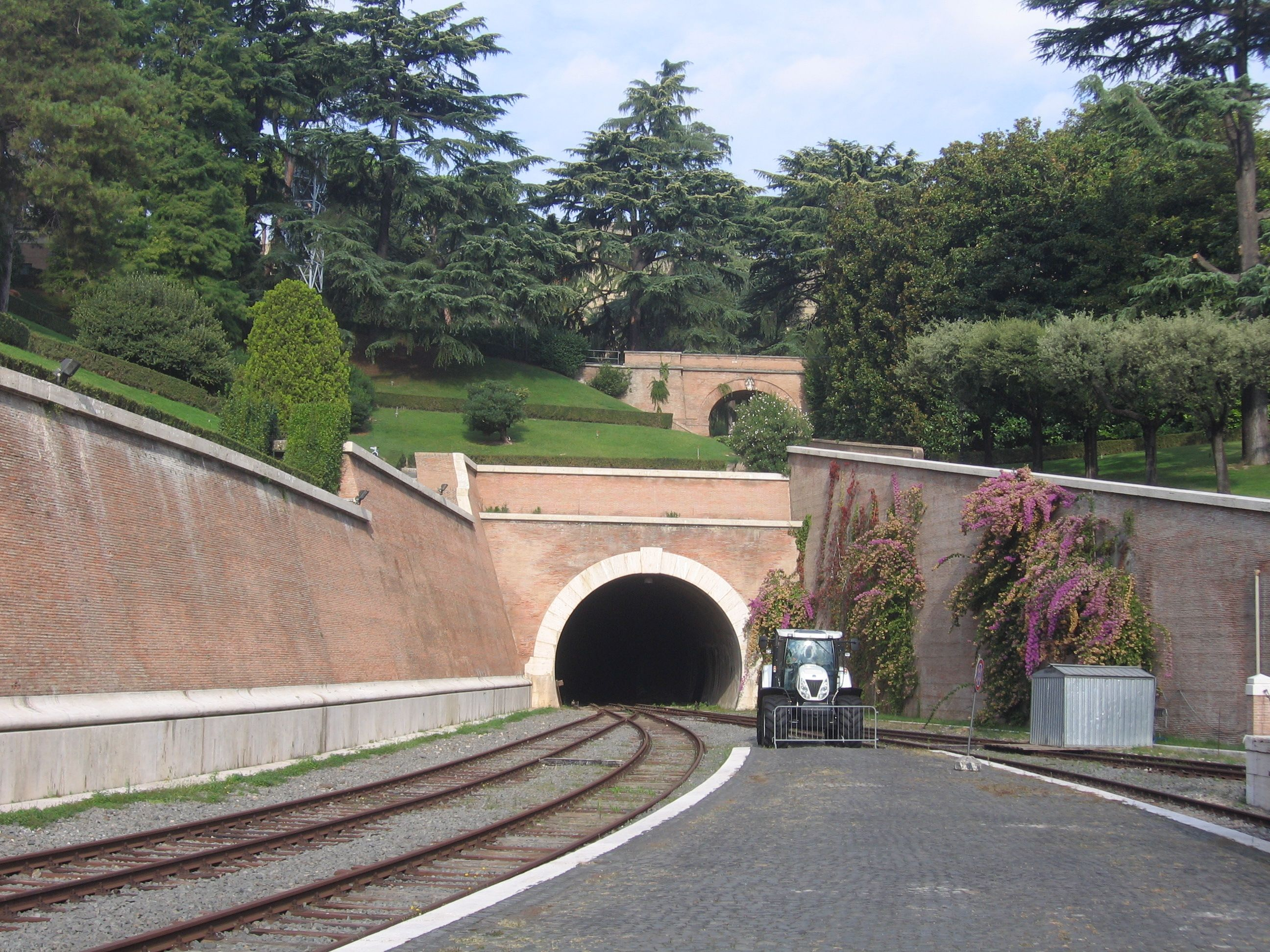
The tunnel to the headshunt with parked tractor, looking north

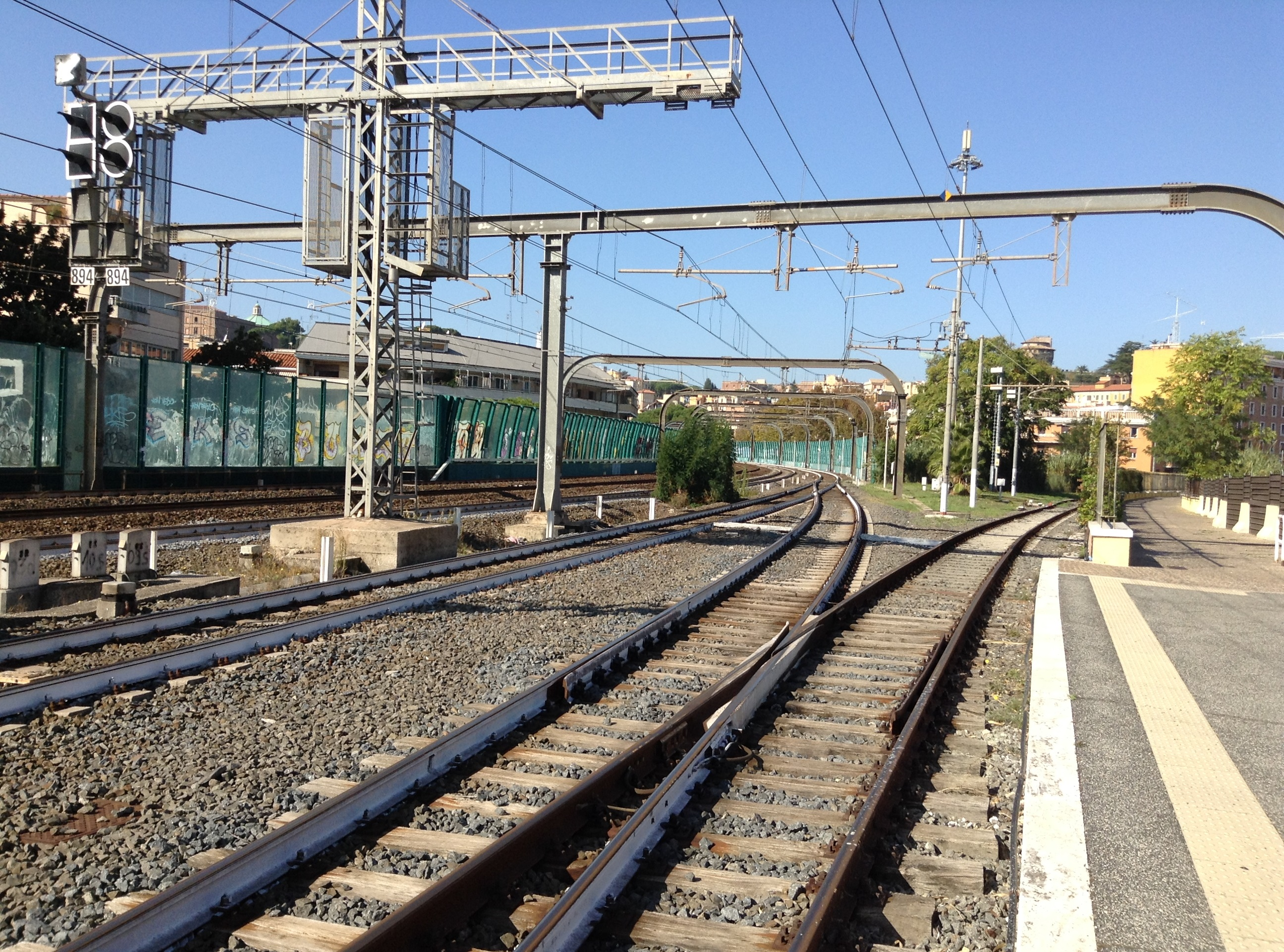
The start of the Vatican Railway at Roma San Pietro railway station, with a parallel footpath to Vatican City, looking north

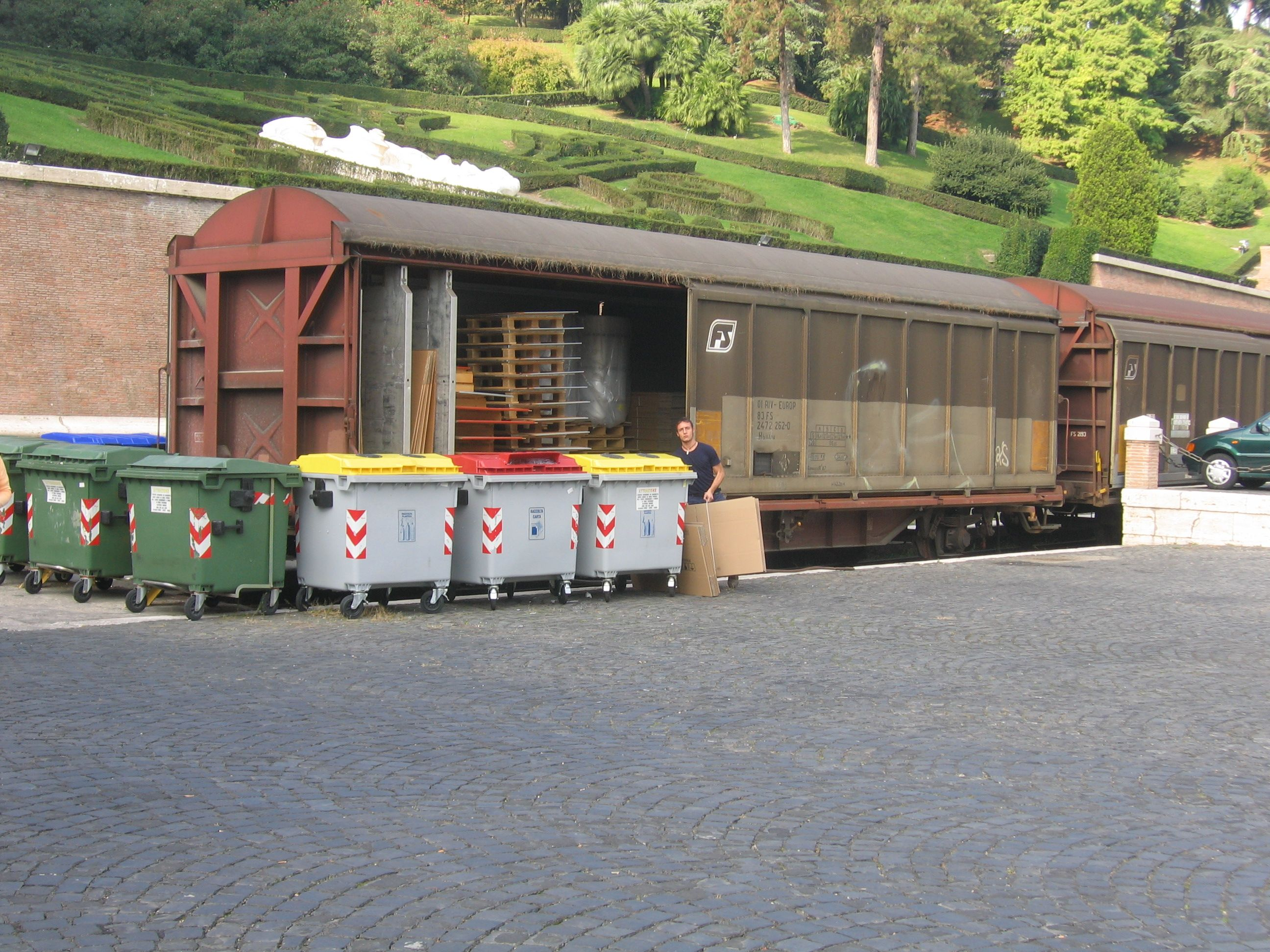
A Ferrovie dello Stato Italiane freight car at Vatican City station

== See also ==
- Transport in Vatican City
- Index of Vatican City-related articles
