= Pisa–Rome railway =

Railway line in Italy

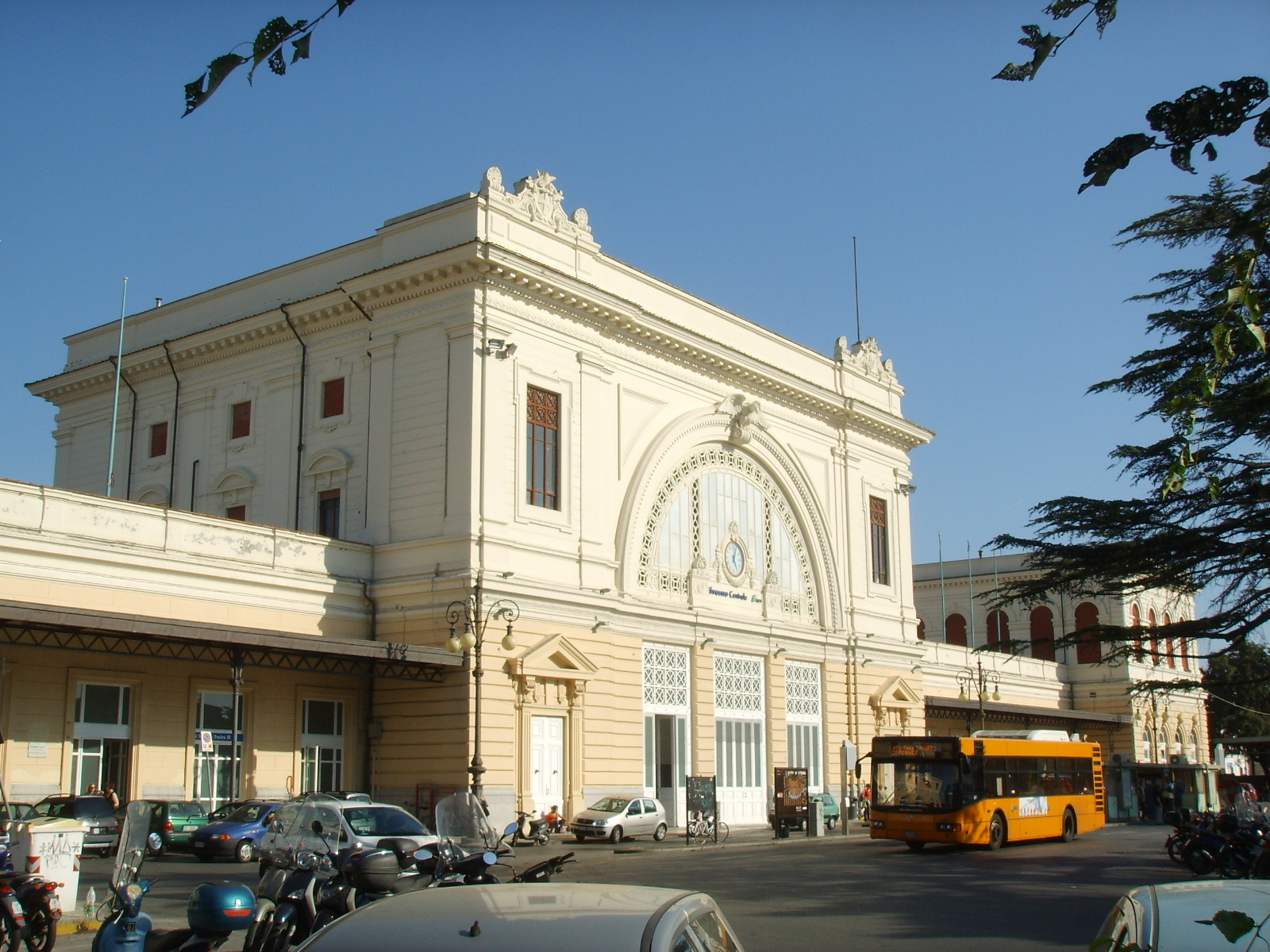
- Livorno Centrale station

Overview
- Native name: Ferrovia Tirrenica
- Status: Operational
- Owner: RFI
- Locale: Italy
- Termini: Pisa Centrale; Roma Termini

Service
- Type: Heavy rail
- Operator(s): Trenitalia

History
- Opened: 1859 to 1867

Technical
- Line length: 312 km (194 mi)
- Number of tracks: 2
- Track gauge: 1,435 mm (4 ft 8 1/2 in)
- Electrification: 3000 V DC
- Operating speed: 200kmh (124mph)
Route map
- Source: Italian railway atlas

The Pisa–Rome railway (also called the ferrovia Tirrenica—"Tyrrhenian Railway") is one of the trunk lines of the Italian railway network. It connects Italy’s northwest with its south, running along the Tyrrhenian coast between the Italian regions of Tuscany and Lazio, through the provinces of Livorno, Grosseto, Viterbo and Rome. The line is double track and is fully electrified at 3,000 V DC. Passenger traffic is managed by Trenitalia.

An international branch line connects from the Pisa–Rome railway at Roma San Pietro railway station to Vatican City: the 300-metre Vatican railway.

== History ==
The southernmost section of the line between Rome and Civitavecchia was opened on 24 April 1859 by the Società Pio Central (Italian for Central Pius Company). In 1862 work started on a line south from Livorno, which initially ran east to Collesalvetti before turning south and joining the path of the current Pisa–Rome line at Vada (now 27 km south of Livorno). This route is now known as the Maremmana railway. The line continued south from Vada and was opened to Nunziatella, near Capalbio, on the border with the Papal States on the Chiarone river in 1864. In 1865 the Leopolda railway was taken over by the owner of the Rome–Civitavecchia railway, now called the Società per le Strade Ferrate Romane (Roman Railways). It opened the connecting section between Civitavecchia and Capalbio in 1867. In 1910 a direct line was opened along the coast from Vada to the new central station at Livorno. A new route was opened between Rome and Maccarese-Fregene via Aurelia on 25 May 1990.

Section	opened
Rome–Civitavecchia (via Ponte Galeria)	24 April 1859
Livorno–Follonica (via Collesalvetti)	20 October 1863
Follonica–Orbetello	15 June 1864
Orbetello–Nunziatella	3 August 1864
Nunziatella–Civitavecchia	27 June 1867
Pisa–Collesalvetti	1 April 1874
Livorno–Vada (via costiera)	3 July 1910
Roma–Maccarese (via Aurelia)	25 May 1990

== See also ==
- List of railway lines in Italy
