= Acilia =

- Frazione
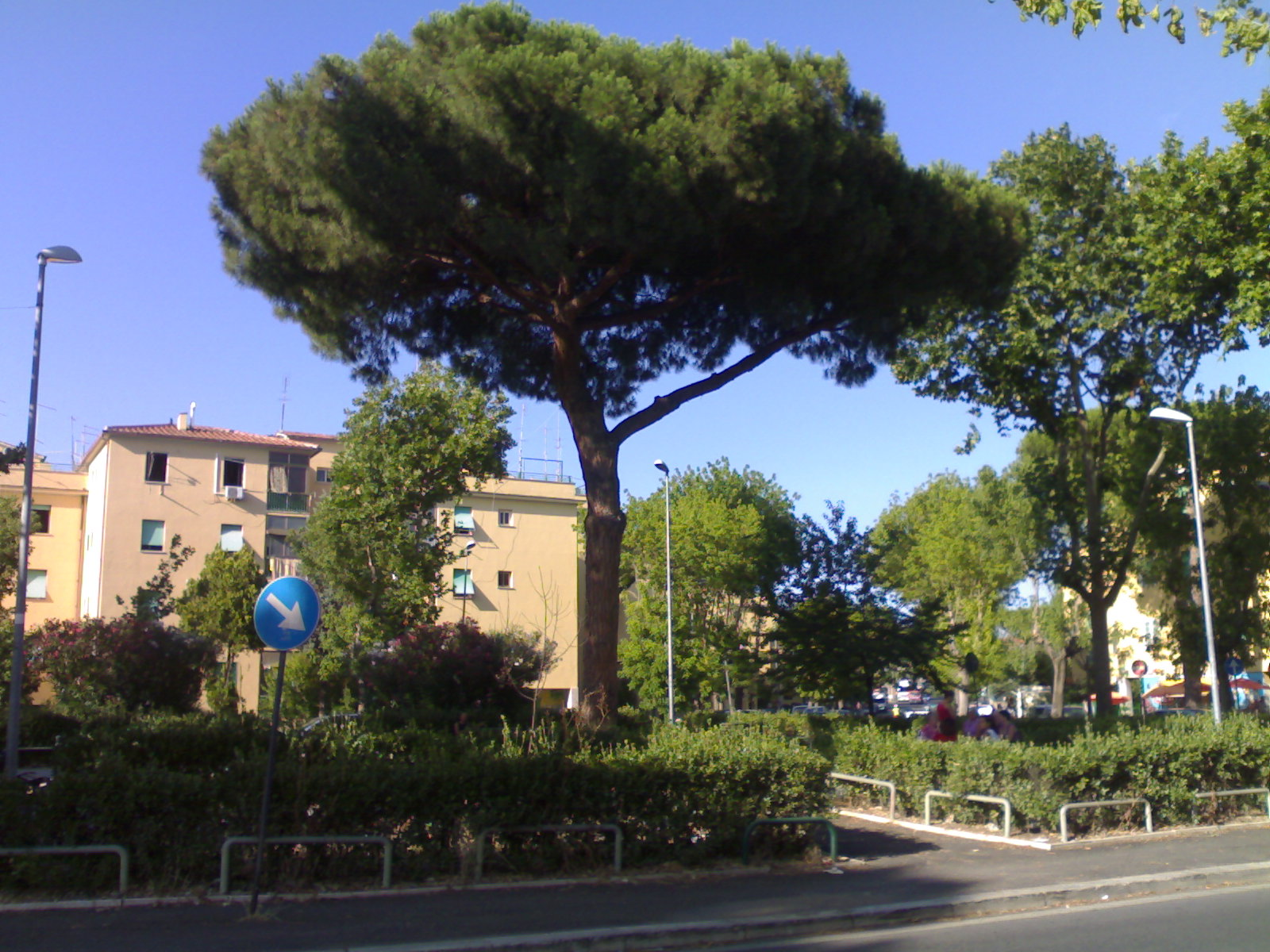
- A stone pine in Giovanni Segantini Square

- Location of Acilia in Italy
- Coordinates: 41°47′00″N 12°22′00″E
- Country: Italy
- Region: Lazio
- Province: Rome (RM)
- Comune: Rome
- Elevation: 5 m (16 ft)

Population (2008)
  - Total: 66,932
- Demonym: aciliani
- Time zone: UTC+1 (CET)
  - Summer (DST): UTC+2 (CEST)
- Postal code: 00125
- Dialing code: 06

Acilia is a neighborhood and a frazione of Rome, Italy, located about half- way between Rome and Ostia, along the Via Ostiense. With a population 66,932 in 2008 it is the third largest Italian frazione after Ostia and Mestre.

== History ==
The name remembers the Roman family of the Acilii, which during the Roman age owned their estates here.

In the years around World War I the zone, once plagued by malaria, was reclaimed. The first modern settlements took place during the 1920s, but only the opening of the Via del mare and of the railway between Rome and Ostia boosted the development of the area.

In 1940 Italian dictator Benito Mussolini inaugurated a settlement designed by the engineer Dario Pater. Here were hosted many inhabitants coming from Borgo, which had lost their homes because of the demolition of the spina.

Today Acilia belongs to the X Municipio, the part of Rome that overlooks the Tyrrhenian Sea.

== Transport ==
Acilia is served by a railway station on the suburban line Rome-Lido. Roman terminal of this line is at Roma Porta San Paolo station, very close to Piramide stop (Rome Metro, Line B) and not too far from the station of Roma Ostiense.

== Education ==
There is a public library in Acilia, Sandro Onofri.

== Notable people ==
Franco Califano, singer, songwriter and actor lived in Acilia.

== See also ==
- Acilia gens
- Ostia
- Ostia Antica
