= Trams in Rome =

Overview of the tram system of Rome, Italy

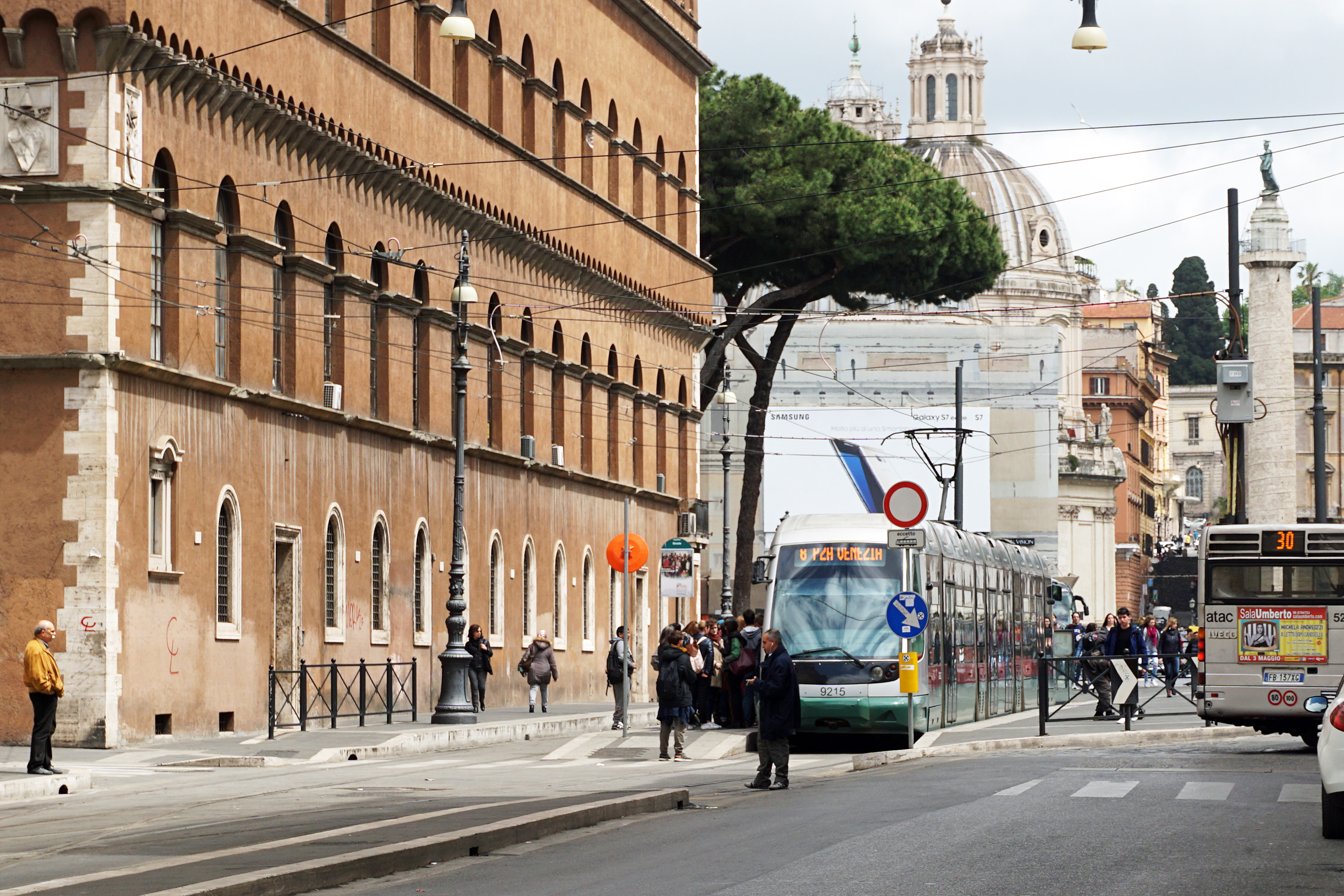
- Tram line 8 terminus Piazza Venezia

Overview
- Locale: Rome
- Transit type: Tram
- Number of lines: 6
- Number of stations: 192

Operation
- Began operation: 1877
- Operator: ATAC
- Number of vehicles: 164

Technical
- System length: 36 km (22 mi)
- Track gauge: 1,445 mm (4 ft 8 7/8 in)
- Electrification: 600 V DC
System map

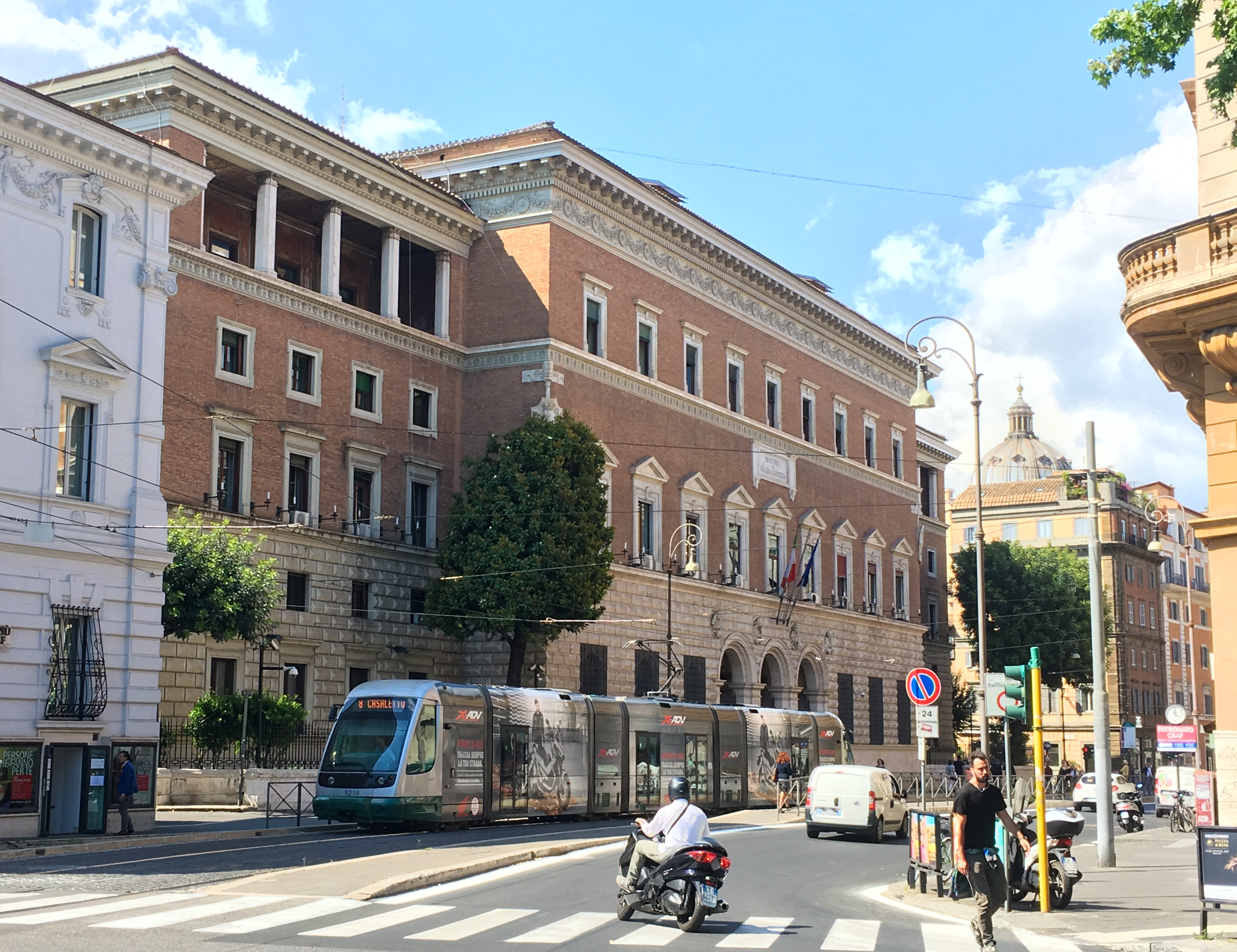
Tram line 8 Fiat Alstom Cityway

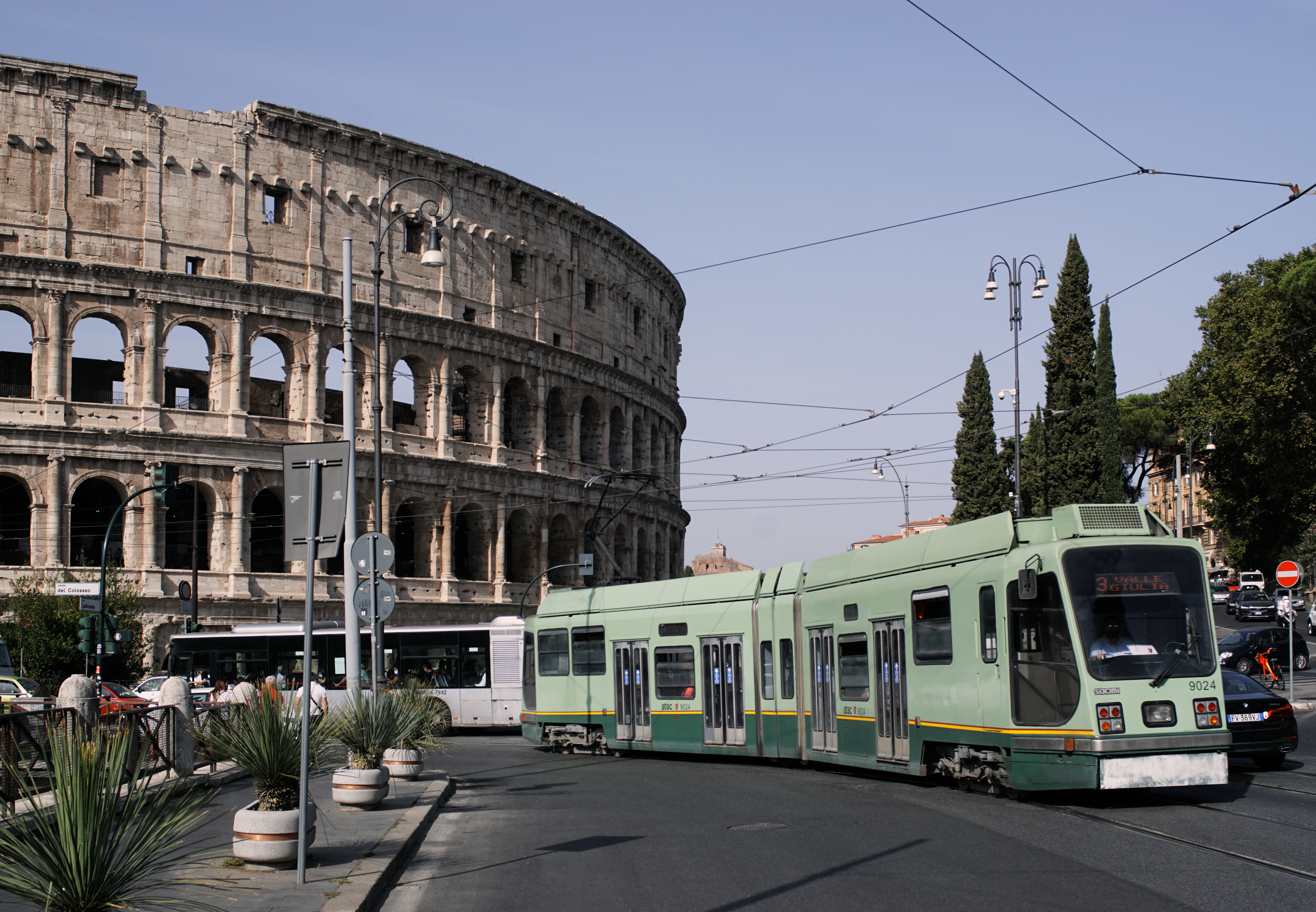
Tram line 3 Socimi in front of Colosseum

The Rome tramway network (Italian: Rete tranviaria di Roma) composed of 6 tram lines operating in the city of Rome, Italy, part of the Rome’s public transport network. The current tram system in Rome, is a leftover from what once was the largest tram system in Italy. The system is owned and operated by Azienda Tranvie e Autobus del Comune di Roma (ATAC SpA).

== Network ==
The key node of the tram network in Rome is Porta Maggiore, where four out of six lines meet (3, 5, 14 and 19), as well as the Rome-Giardinetti railway. This is about 1 km east of Roma Termini railway station, and not connected to the metro network.

The following lines currently run:

Piazzale Flaminio ↔ Piazza Mancini

This short line runs through the Flaminio neighbourhood, connecting at Piazzale Flaminio (near the Porta del Popolo) with Line A and the Rome-Viterbo railway line. Some runs of the 2 on weekdays (marked as 2/) run from Piazza Mancini to Piazza Risorgimento, running with the 19 across the Tevere to the Vatican.

Piazza Thorvaldsen (in the Villa Borghese) ↔ Trastevere railway station.

Partially reopened on 27 August 2012. This is the longest line after line 19, going round the city centre in a wide arc from north via east to south-west. At the western endpoint Trastevere railway station, this line connects with the Regional railways (lines 1, 3 and 5), while connections with Metro A are at Manzoni and San Giovanni. There are four connections with metro Line B: one at Policlinico, and three on the stretch Piramide – Circo Massimo (Rome Metro) – Colosseo, where line 3 follows Metro B on the surface. The remainder of the line from the Roma Trastevere railway station to Piazzale Ostiense continued until 2016 to be served by a substitute bus service, the 3B, pending the completion of infrastructural works. On 8 August 2016, the tram service was restored on this last segment. Line 3 now runs on its entire original route.

Roma Termini railway station ↔ Piazza dei Gerani.

This line runs east from Termini railway station. It connects with line A at Termini metro station, Piazza Vittorio Emanuele II and Manzoni.

Piazza Venezia ↔ Via del Casaletto.

Line 8 is the newest line of the system, always running with modern stock. It also reaches furthest into the historic city centre, connecting it with Trastevere railway station. Work on an extension began on 19 June 2012 and the new terminus, located in piazza Venezia, opened on 6 June 2013.

Stazione Termini ↔ Viale Palmiro Togliatti

This line mostly follows the route of line 5, but with a different eastern terminus.

Piazza Risorgimento ↔ Piazza dei Gerani.

This line connects the Vatican with the rest of the tram network, following the route of first line 3, and then line 5. It connects with the metro at Ottaviano – San Pietro – Musei Vaticani, Lepanto (Rome Metro) (both Line A) and Policlinico (line B). Line 19 is the longest line, connecting with all other tram lines, except for line 8.

== History ==
Rome had horse-drawn omnibuses after 1845, when pope Gregory XVI authorized a line from Piazza Venezia to the Basilica di San Paolo fuori le mura to transport pilgrims. This first line did not run according to a timetable; trams left when they were full. Horse trams arrived in 1877, connecting Piazzale Flaminio with the Ponte Milvio, the current line 2.

In 1895, electric trams arrived, connecting Termini station to Piazza San Silvestro. By 1904, all horse tram lines had been electrified – the Ponte Milvio tram last. By 1905, a total of 17 tram lines were operating, using 144 electric vehicles, with a number of horse-drawn trams functioning as backup.

After a few years of competition with the incumbent company SRTO, in 1929, government-controlled company ATAG (Azienda Tranvie Autobus del Governo di Roma) took over the whole network, and by the end of that year, the network had reached its largest extent: no fewer than 59 lines along 140 km of track.

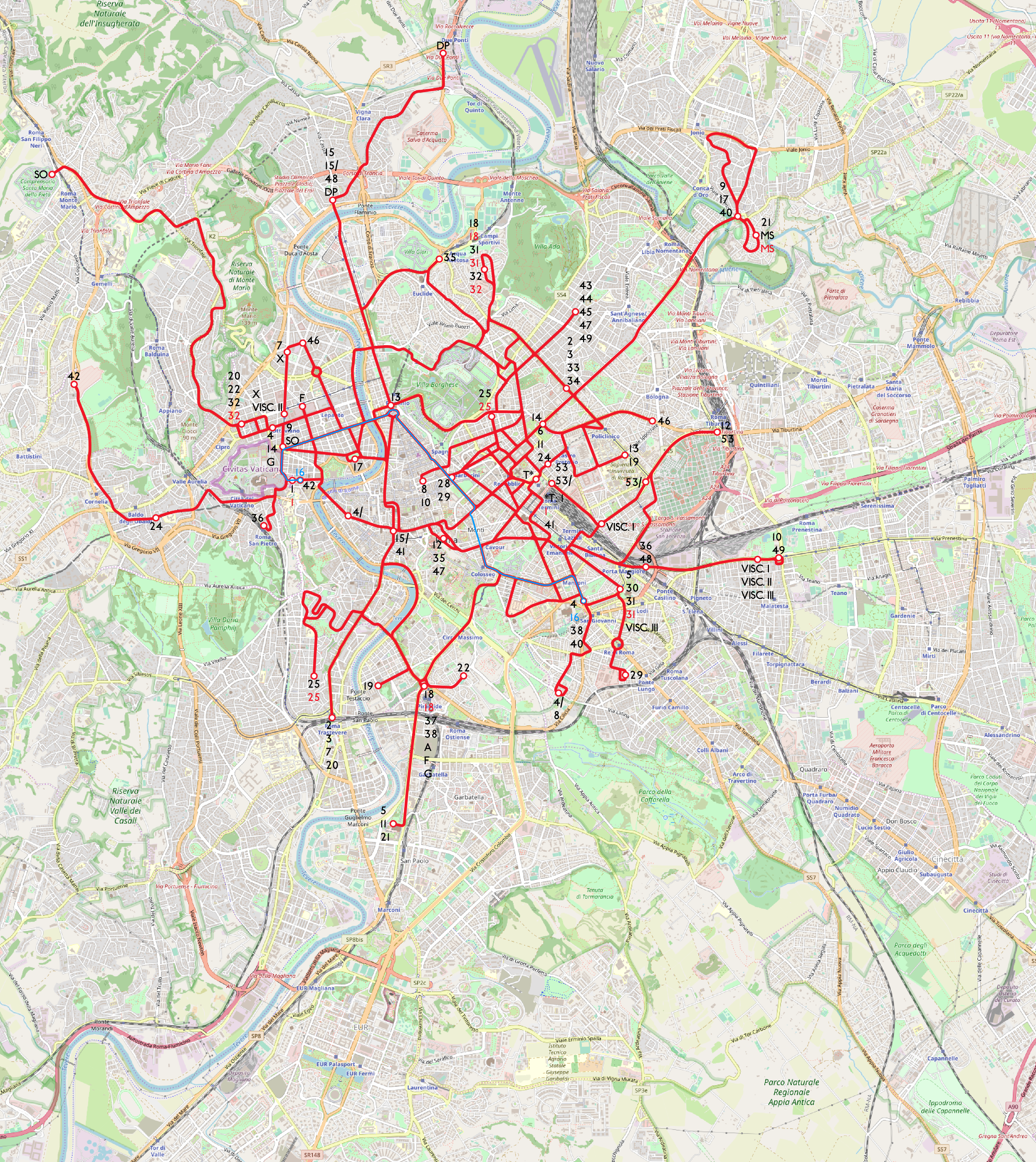
Rome’s tram network at its maximal extent in 1929.

As many lines shared parts of their routes, a large reorganization took place in 1930: from then on, two circular lines functioned alongside 24 radial lines, which all started out from the inner ring (the 'black ring'), and crossed the outer ring (the 'red ring'). Within the inner ring, all tram lines were cancelled and substituted by autobuses. 40 kilometers of tracks were dismantled, and part of the older rolling stock was demolished.

After the Second World War, the operating company changed its name to ATAC (Azienda Tranvie ed Autobus del Comune di Roma), but the network kept shrinking. The inner ring was deactivated in 1959; the outer ring only ran in one direction from that year until reconstruction in 1975. The connection Piazzale Flaminio-Ponte Milvio was cancelled in 1960 and reconstructed in 1983 (northern part) and 1990 (southern part). Line 8 was opened in 1998. There are plans to open more lines, including connections from the current northern terminus of line 8 to Termini, and a line from the same terminus towards the Vatican.

== SRTO stock ==
=== Horse trams ===
The number of horse trams is unknown, but there were probably over a hundred.

=== Motorcars ===
- serie 200: two axles, two motors, 102 built between 1895 and 1905
- serie 300: two axles, two motors, 70 constructed between 1902 and 1907; called torpediniere
- serie 400: two axles, two motors, 79 constructed between 1908 and 1911
- serie 800: only 4 trams

=== Cars ===
- serie 1000: 40 two-axled cars, built between 1909 and 1911, scrapped in 1930.
- serie 1100: only four cars, for the serie 800

== ATAC stock ==
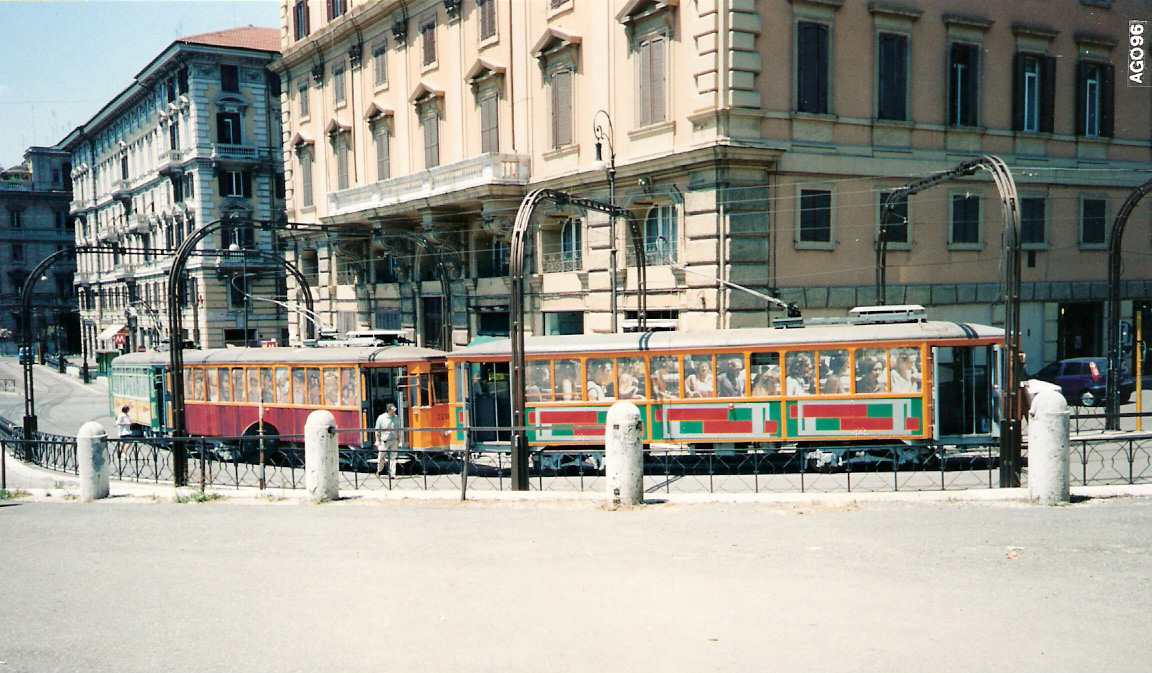
Motorcars MRS 2055, 2219 and 2221 at Piazzale Flaminio, 1996.

This list includes all stock of the ATAC (including that running under its former names AATM, ATM, ATG, ATAG, ATAC or the Trambus brand.)

=== Two-axle motorcars ===
- 91 motorcars with 6 windows, built 1911–1914. One car is preserved in the Seashore Trolley Museum in Kennebunkport, Maine, United States.
- 56 motorcars, similar to the above, built 1919–1921.
- 40 motorcars with 7 windows, built 1921–1923
- 280 motorcars with 8 windows, built 1923–1927. One car preserved by the Gruppo Romano Amici della Ferrovia.

=== Trailers ===
- a giardiniera, 107 cars
- 6 windows, 237 cars
- 8 windows, 129 cars

=== Bogie cars ===
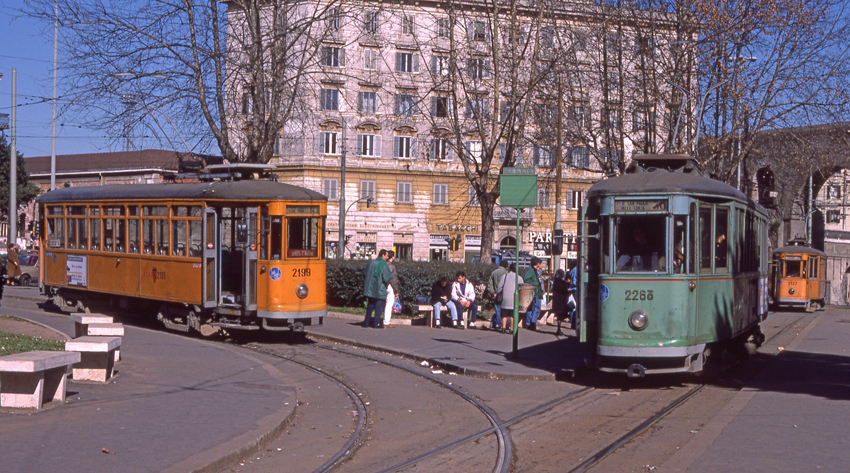
Three MRS class trams in 1988

- 133 motorcars, MRS class, number 2001-2265, built from 1927 to 1934. Retired between 1996 and 2003
- 22 motorcars, PCC All Electric class, built in 1957, retired between 2001 and 2003

=== Articulated ===
- 50 motorcars, MATER class, built in 1935 using "8 windows" trailer and motor cars, all retired in 1965

== Trams currently in use ==
=== ATAC Series 7000 (7001–7115) ===
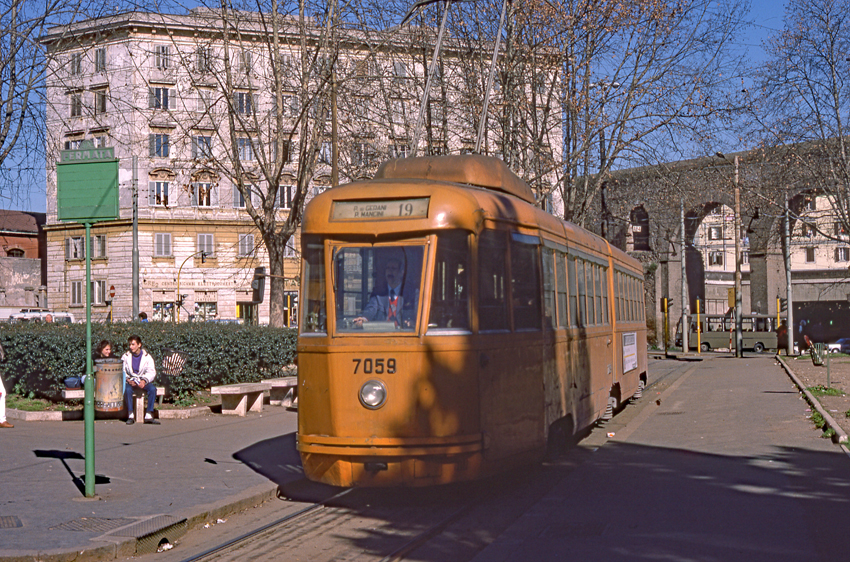
ATAC articulated tram 7059 in 1988

After the positive experience with trams 401–412 (1937), in 1940 ATAG commissioned the Mechanical Workshops of Stanga of Padua to build an articulated prototype tram. The prototype, delivered in 1942 and numbered 7001, operated briefly and was destroyed in the bombing of Rome on 19 July 1943. The order was confirmed, however, and the delivery of 50 cars (7003–7099, 7001) occurred between 1948 and 1949.

These cars, which have undergone an operation for modernization in the 1980s, are still in operation in Rome, with the exception of 7073 and 7093 that were recently scrapped. Number 7021 has been transformed into "Ristotram" (restaurant car).

A further order of eight similar trams was made in 1953 for STEFER suburban network(7101–7115, odd numbers only). These were later modernized by ATAC at the Viberti workshops.

=== SOCIMI T8000 (9001-9041) ===
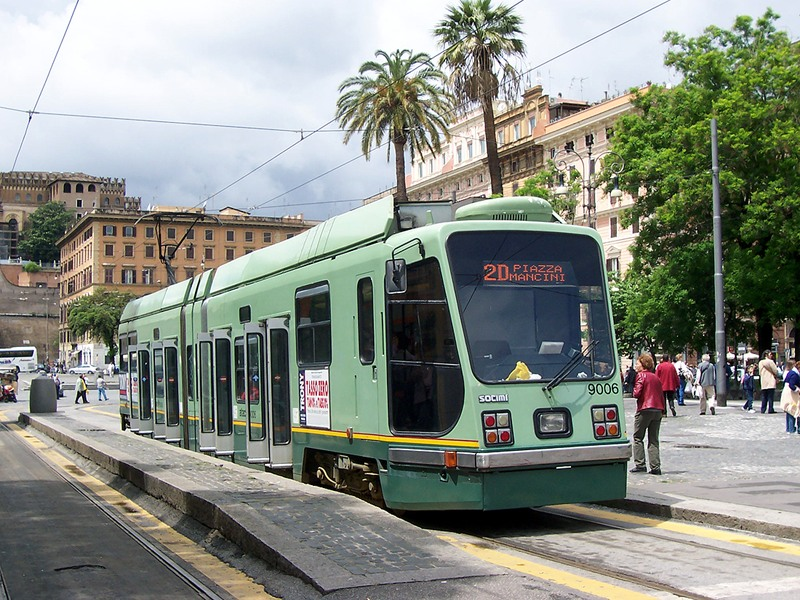
SOCIMI tram 9006 at Piazza Risorgimento in 2010

33 articulated double-ended low-floor tramcars (9001-9033) were delivered in 1990 and 1991 by SOCIMI in Milan. These trams are fitted with a 2-axle bogies at both ends, and small wheels in the centre of the car (wheel arrangement Bo'2'Bo'), thus allowing a 70% low floor. Since SOCIMI went broke during production, 27 of the 60 cars on order were not built at the time, but in 2003 and 2004 eight additional cars (9034-9041) entered service, assembled from spare parts salvaged from the dissolved SOCIMI works.

=== Cityway I (9101–9128) ===
These double-articulated trams were ordered from Fiat Ferroviaria in 1998 to mark the opening of line 8. 28 trams were ordered. 70% of its length is low-floor; raised floor sections are located at the ends. The entire train measures 31 m (102 ft). One innovation introduced was the air conditioning system. Currently they are in regular operation on lines 2 and 8.

=== Cityway 2 (9201–9252) ===
In 1999, another 52 articulated trams were ordered from Fiat-Alstom, following the new trend of 100% low-floor trams. The tram is made up of four sections mounted on separate trucks, and alternate with three suspended sections. The length is 33 m (108 ft). The cars 9217 and 9218 are prototypes which never entered into service, which had additional articulated sections, forming a vehicle of 41.45 m (136.0 ft) in length, with 9 sections and 5 trucks. These trams are used only for line 8.

=== CAF Urbos (9301–9380) ===
On March 5, 2025, ATAC received the first of an order for 80 CAF Urbos. The double-ended trams are 33.5 m (110 ft) long and can carry 215 passengers, 68 seated. They will replace trams from the 7000-series Stanga and 9000-series SOCIMI.

== Trams in film ==
In the course of time, hundreds of films have been filmed in Rome, partly due to the presence of the studios at Cinecittà. Trams feature in some of them:

- Roma città aperta, 1945
- Ladri di bicyclette, 1948
- Umberto D., 1949
- I soliti ignoti, 1956
- Il ferroviere, 1957
- Totò e Marcellino, 1958
- Roma, 1970
- Io, Chiara e lo scuro, 1982
- Intervista, 1987
- Tre uomini e una gamba, 1997

The tramway line to Cinecittà is credited to have had a crucial role in the neorealist film-making, as directors drew ideas for subjects while travelling with people from working classes.
