= Settimia Spizzichino =

Italian holocaust survivor (1921–2000)

- Born: April 15, 1921; Rome, Kingdom of Italy
- Died: July 3, 2000 (aged 79); Rome, Italy
- Resting place: Flaminio Cemetery, Rome
- Known for: Holocaust survivor and witness

Settimia Spizzichino (15 April 1921, Rome – 3 July 2000, Rome) was an Italian Holocaust survivor, the only woman to survive the roundup of the Roman ghetto; over the years, she became one of the preeminent witnesses and historical memoirists of the Italian Shoah.

== Biography ==
The fifth of six children, Settimia Spizzichino was born in the Roman ghetto. Her father, Mosè Mario Spizzichino, was a book dealer. Her mother, Grazia Di Segni, was a teacher at the local Jewish school. Her brothers and sisters were Gentile and Pacifico, Ada, Enrica, and Giuditta.

In Rome, a state comprehensive school ("Poggiali-Spizzichino") and the railway overpass (Ponte Settimia Spizzichino) between Via Ostiense and the Ostiense ring road are named after her. The city of Cava de'Tirreni in 2011 he named a street after her.

== In Theater ==
The play "Rome-Auschwitz Round Trip" by Roberto Bencivenga and Luciana Tedesco Bramante, written in collaboration with their niece Carla Di Veroli, who provided several materials and testimonies, is inspired by the story of Settimia Spizzichino, narrating the events from the promulgation of the racial laws until her return home after deportation. The play was first performed on the tenth anniversary of Settimia's death.

== See also ==
- Raid on the Roman Ghetto
- The Holocaust in Italy
- Holocaust survivors
- Bibliography of the Holocaust
- Auschwitz concentration camp
- Ponte Settimia Spizzichino
- Block 10
