= Liberato Firmino Sifonia =

Italian composer

Liberato Firmino Sifonia (Geneva, 6 February 1917 - Lanciano, 25 December 1996) was an Italian composer.

== Biography ==
Son of an Italian double bass player, he completed his literary and musical studies in the Principality of Monaco and later attended master classes in France with Alfred Cortot, Lazare Lévy and Claude Delvincourt. He was also a pupil of Goffredo Petrassi at the Accademia Nazionale di Santa Cecilia in Rome, where he obtained his diploma in composition. His fellow students included Boris Porena, Ennio Morricone and Domenico Guaccero.

Between 1953 and 1958 he was responsible for the musical programming of RAI's third channel. He taught composition at the Perugia Conservatory from 1958 to 1965, at the Bologna Conservatory from 1965 to 1969, and then became director of the Pescara and Florence Conservatories from 1977 to 1987.

In 1962, he was appointed secretary of the Italian National Committee for Music at UNESCO.

== Style ==
Around the 1950s, Sifonia embraced the serial technique, without, however, leaning towards the radicalism of the Nuova Musica currents and successfully achieving an effective and immediate communicativeness. His personal interpretation of serialism gave him evocative pages of artistic value, in which a particular care for instrumentation emerges (especially in solo concerts). He is the author of much symphonic, vocal and choral music and essays on musical analysis.
