= Porta San Paolo Railway Museum =

Rome Porta San Paolo Railway Park Museum
- Parco museo ferroviario Roma Porta San Paolo
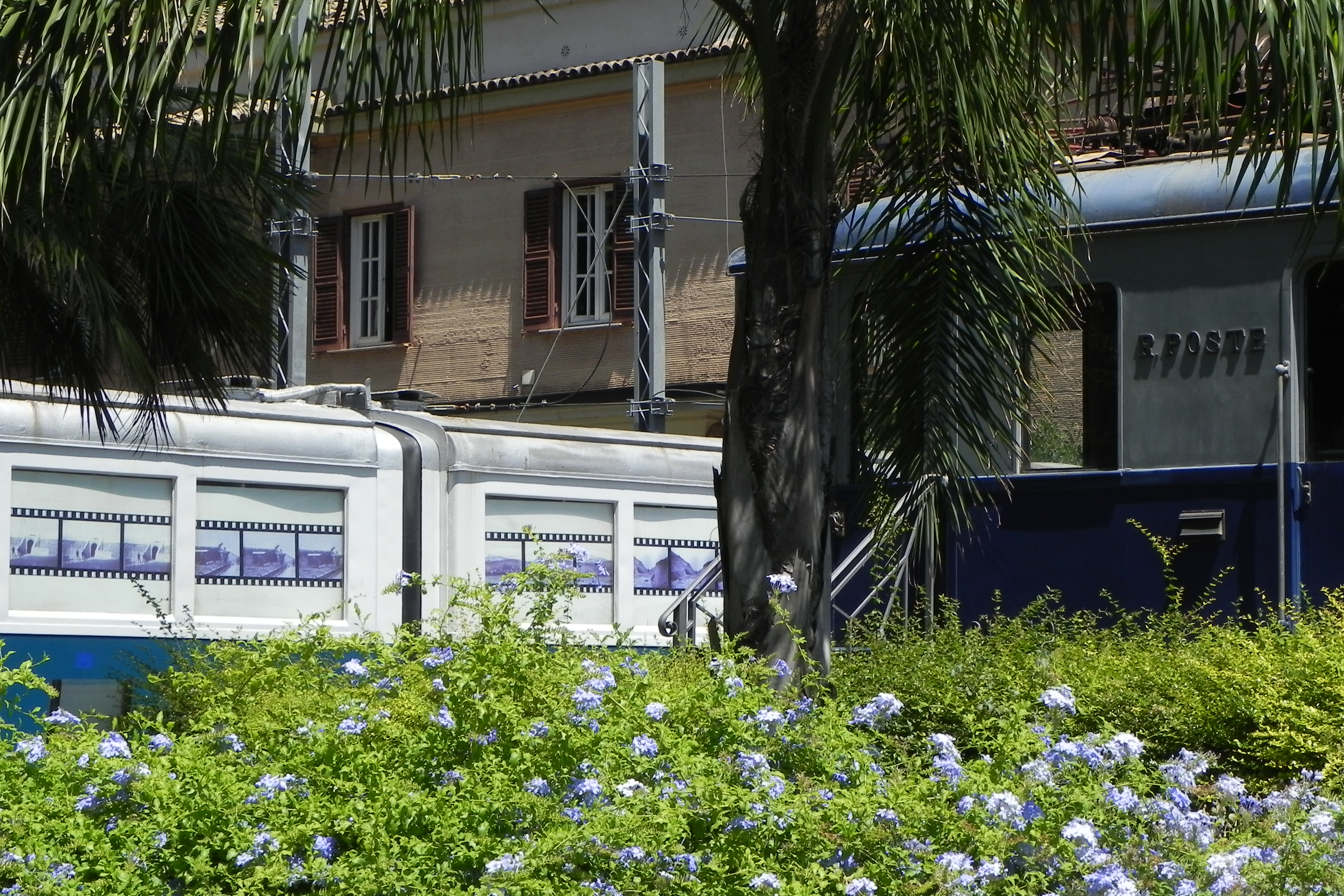
- Railway Park Museum
- Click on the map for a fullscreen view
- Established: September 18th 2004
- Location: Rome, Piazza di Porta San Paolo
- Coordinates: 41°52′29″N 12°28′57″E
- Type: Railway and tramline museum
- Website: http://www.roma.it/page.asp?p=137&r=1507&rs=1&act=1

The Rome Porta San Paolo Railway Park Museum is a museum in Rome (Italy), concerned with railway and tram transportation. It is housed next to the Roma Porta San Paolo railway station and the Piramide station of the metro (line B).

== General ==
The museum, inaugurated on 18 September 2004, is in part in the open, where the restored rolling stock can be seen, and in part indoors, where scale models, devices and technical objects are displayed, providing a full outline of the history of public rail transport in the Rome area.

== Rolling stock ==
The rolling stock examples kept in the museum include:

- Locomotive Breda AEG, year 1915, s.n. 01 STEFER from the Rome–Fiuggi railway.
- Locomotive Carminati-Toselli TIBB, year 1922, s.n. 05 STEFER from the Rome–Lido railway.
- Electric locomotive ECD "Officine Meccaniche della Stanga" TIBB, year 1931, s.n. 21 from the Rome–Civitacastellana–Viterbo railway.
- Tram STFER series 400, s.n. 404 "Officine Meccaniche della Stanga" TIBB, year 1941, from the Tramvie dei Castelli Romani.
- Tram STEFER, s.n. 70, from the extra-urban service on the Castelli Romani lines.
- STEFER, flat service wagon obtained by modifying a former extra-urban two-axle trailer.
- Power trolley STEFER used for inspections on the Rome–Fiuggi railway.

== Photo gallery ==
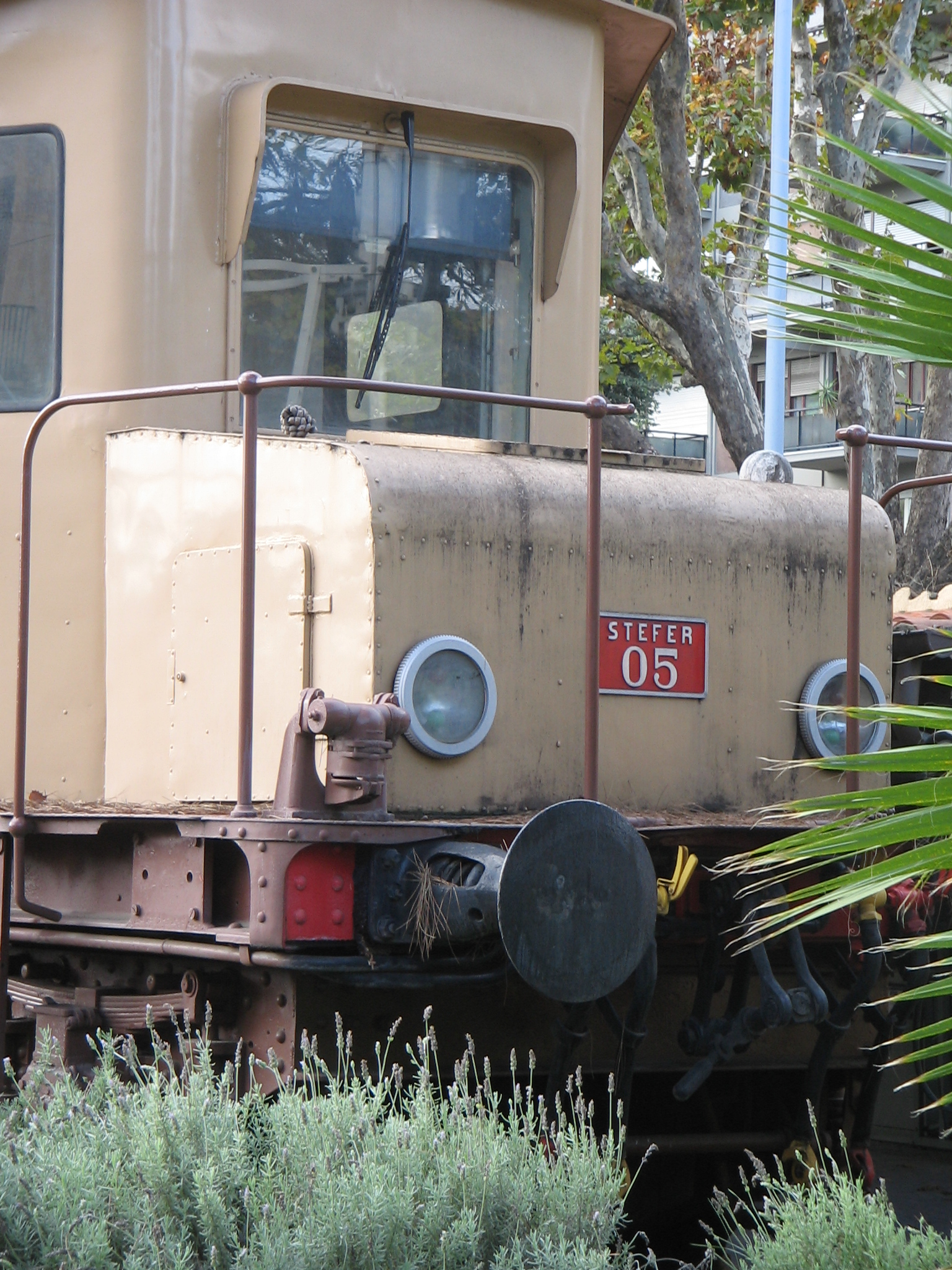
Electric locomotive "STEFER" 05

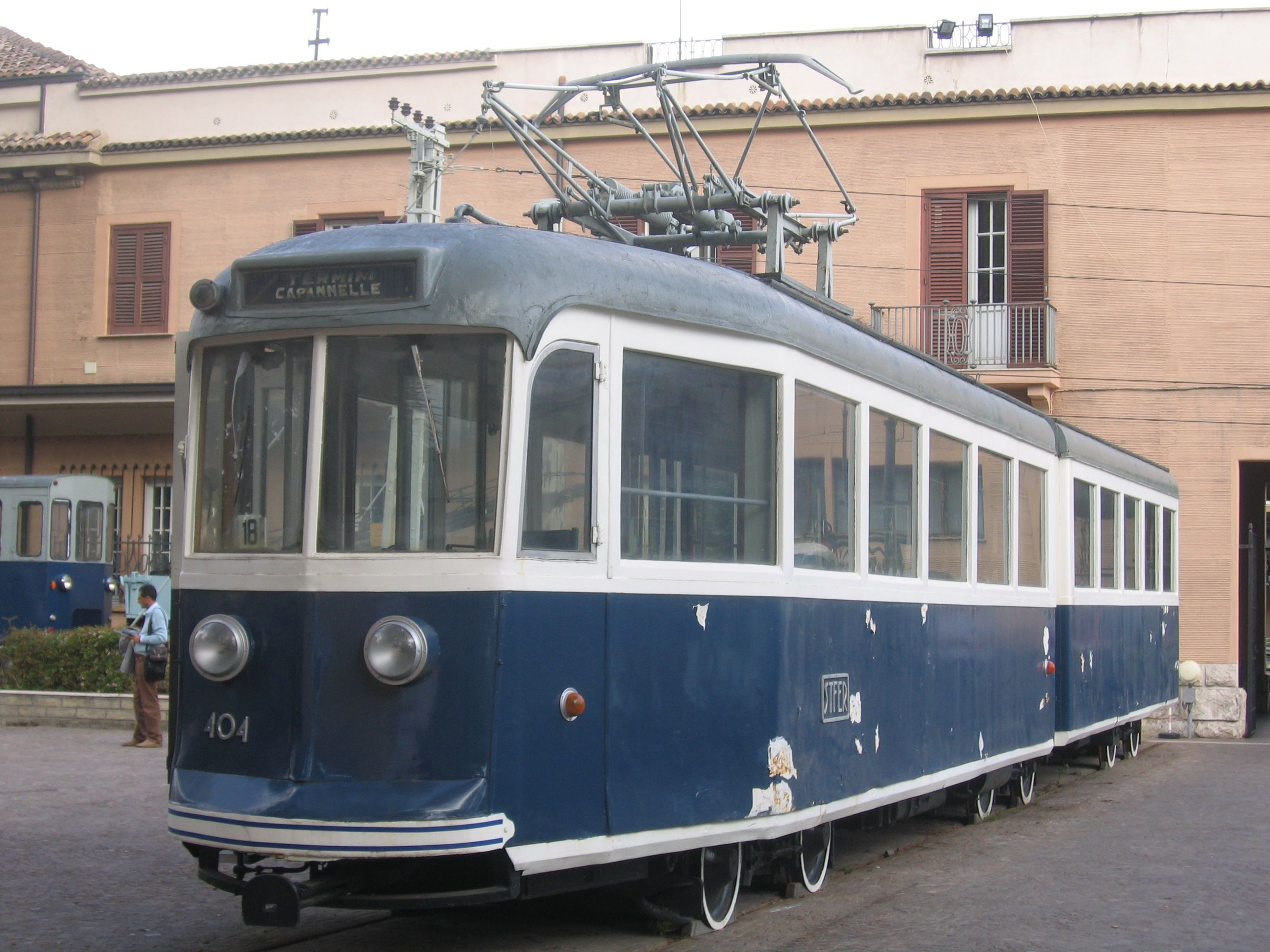
Tram STFER series 400

== Connections ==
- Piramide station, Line B.

Preceded by Pigorini National Museum of Prehistory and Ethnography	Landmarks of Rome; Porta San Paolo Railway Museum	Succeeded by Accademia Nazionale di Santa Cecilia Musical Instruments Museum
