= Venanzo Crocetti Museum =

Art museum in Rome, Italy

Museum Venanzo Crocetti
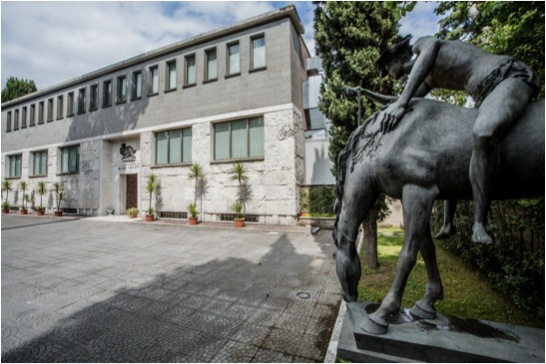
- Museo Crocetti
- Click on the map for a fullscreen view
- Location: Rome
- Coordinates: 41°57′33″N 12°27′15″E

Museum Venanzo Crocetti is a contemporary art museum dedicated to the work of the Italian sculptor Venanzo Crocetti (1913–2003).

The museum is located in Rome at Via Cassia, 492.

== History ==
The museum is housed in the building that originally was the main studio of the sculptor.

== Organisation ==
Venanzo Crocetti Museum preserved over a hundred bronzes, marbles, paintings, works on paper and documents that span a period of time ranging from 1930 to 1998.

Venanzo Crocetti works are in Rome, Brussels, Paris, Bern, Zurich, New York, San Paolo of Brazil, Montreal, Tokyo and Osaka. In 1991, in Saint Petersburg, the Hermitage Museum has dedicated to the Venanzio Crocetti work a permanent exhibition.

The Museum Venanzo Crocetti also houses selected contemporary art exhibitions.

Preceded by Accademia Nazionale di Santa Cecilia Musical Instruments Museum	Landmarks of Rome; Venanzo Crocetti Museum	Succeeded by Apollo Belvedere
