= Ponte Settimia Spizzichino =

Bridge in Rome, Italy

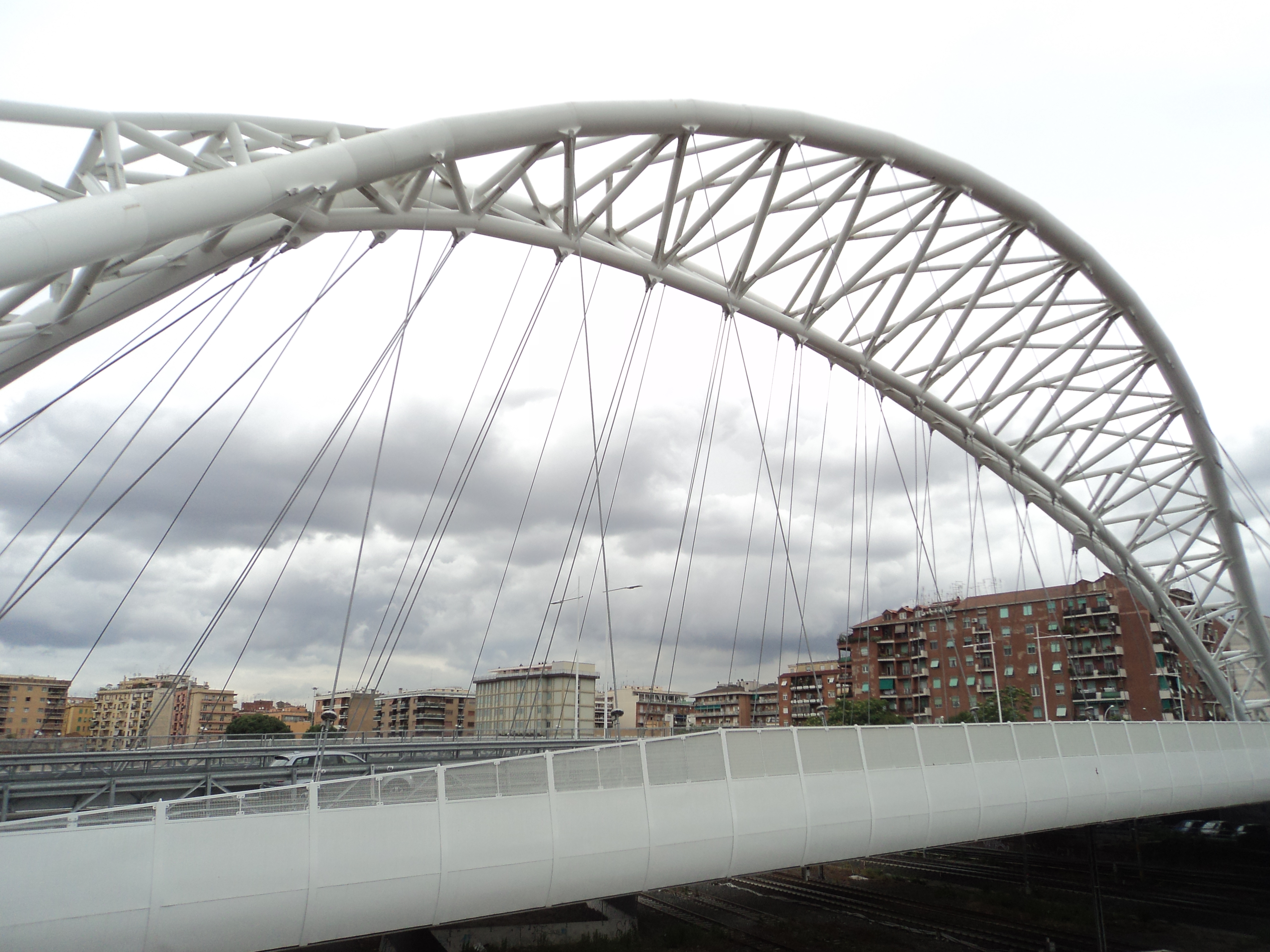
- Coordinates: 41°52′02″N 12°28′59″E
- Carries: Motor vehicles, pedestrians, bicycles and public transport
- Crosses: Rome–Lido railway, Rome Metro Line B
- Locale: Rome, Lazio, Italy
- Other name: Cavalcavia Ostiense

Characteristics
- Design: Arch bridge
- Material: Steel
- Total length: 160 m (520 ft)
- Height: 42 m (138 ft)
- Longest span: 126 m (413 ft)

History
- Designer: Solidus s.r.l.
- Constructed by: Cimolai SpA
- Construction start: 2009
- Construction end: 2012
- Construction cost: €15.4 million
- Opened: 20 June 2012

Location
- Interactive map of Ponte Settimia Spizzichino

The Ponte Settimia Spizzichino, also known as Cavalcavia Ostiense, is a viaduct in Roma that passes over the Rome-Lido railway line and the route of Line B of the Rome Metro. It is part of the Circonvallazione Ostiense.

== Description ==
The design of the lattice structure was achieved using graphic processing techniques and 3D modeling software. Particular attention was paid to the lighting, designed by Francesco Bianchi. Construction lasted three years; the work was completed on 20 June 2012 and cost approximately 15.4 million euros.

On the proposal of the council of the Municipio VIII, the bridge was named in memory of Settimia Spizzichino, the only woman who survived the raid on the Roman Ghetto by the Nazis on 16 October 1943 and the subsequent deportation of 1,259 people to Auschwitz.

== See also ==
- List of bridges in Rome
