= Venanzo Crocetti =

Italian sculptor

Venanzo Crocetti (1913–2003) was an Italian sculptor. He was born in Giulianova, Abruzzo.

In 1938 Venanzo Crocetti received the Grand Prize in the 19th Venice Biennale. "The Door of the Sacraments" of the St. Peter's Basilica Crocetti finished in 1966. In 1972 he was nominated as president of the Accademia di San Luca.

Crocetti received the Golden Decoration from the Italian Ministry of Education for his achievement in fine art and culture.

Venanzo Crocetti Museum is a foundation in Rome dedicated to the work of the artist.

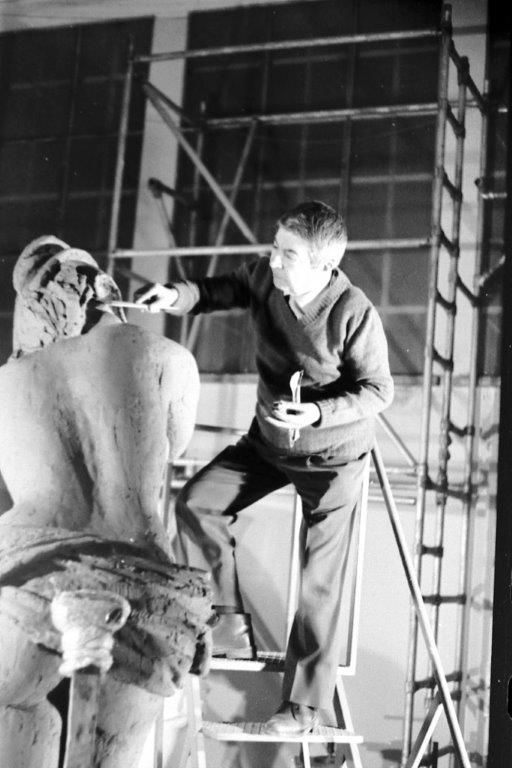
Venanzo Crocetti, was an Italian sculptor
