= Circo Massimo (Rome Metro) =

Rome metro station

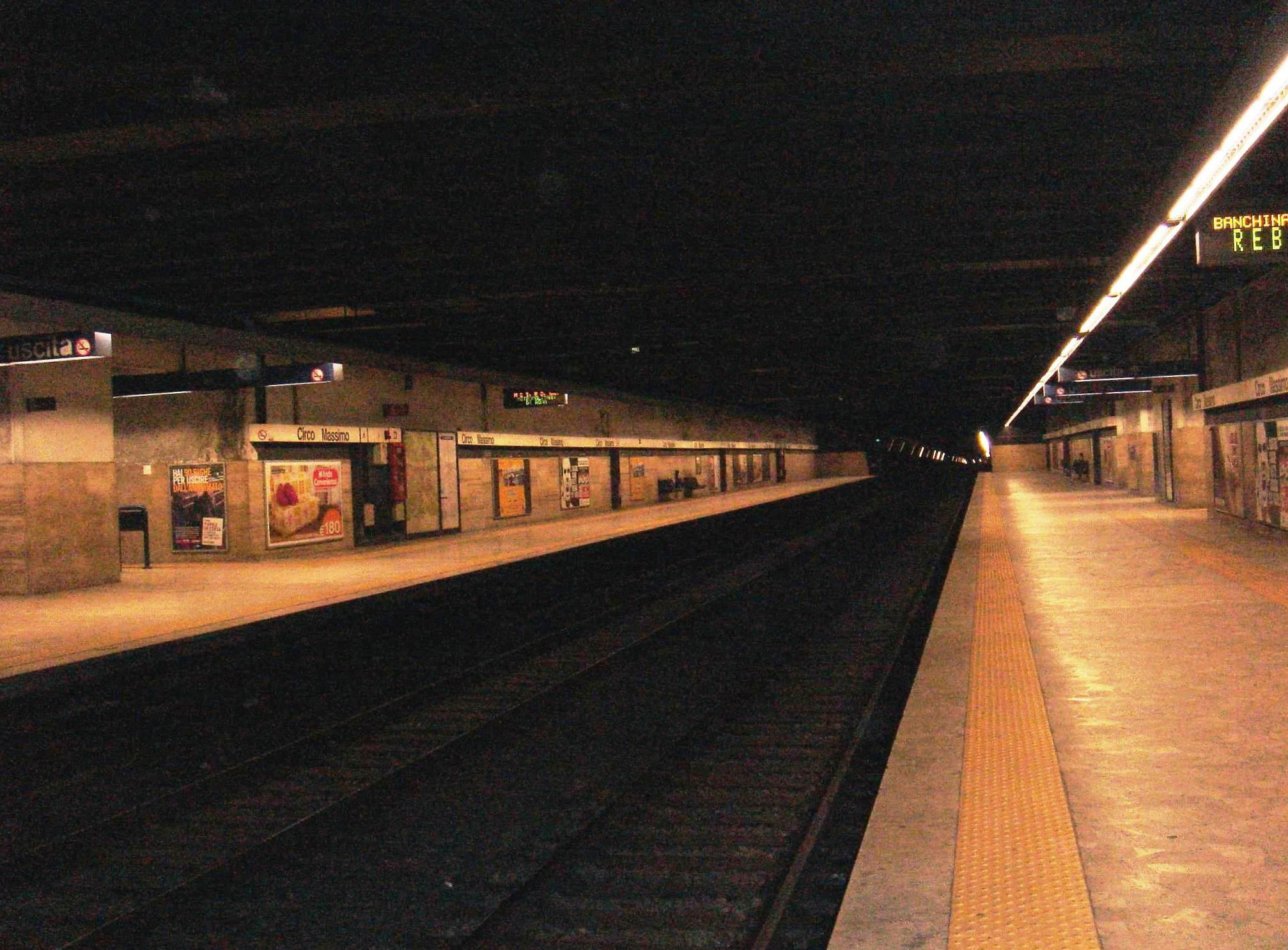

General information
- Coordinates: 41°53′01″N 12°29′17″E
- Owner: ATAC
- Platforms: 2 side platforms

Construction
- Structure type: Underground

History
- Opened: 10 February 1955; 71 years ago

Services
Preceding station	Rome Metro	Following station
Piramide towards Laurentina	Line B	Colosseo towards Rebibbia or Jonio
Location
- Click on the map to see marker

Circo Massimo is a station on Line B of the Rome Metro. It was opened on 10 February 1955 and is sited at the east end of the Circus Maximus, after which it is named, near the headquarters of the FAO, originally built as the Ministero delle Colonie. Until 2002, the Obelisk of Axum also stood near the station. It has two separate exits on either side of the viale Aventino.

== Surroundings ==
- Porta Capena
- Baths of Caracalla
- Passeggiata Archeologica
- Aventino
- Via dei Cerchi
- Roseto comunale
- rione San Saba
- Viale Aventino
- Stadio delle Terme

=== Churches ===
- Santa Balbina all'Aventino
- Santa Sabina
- Santi Alessio e Bonifacio
- Santa Prisca
- San Saba
- San Gregorio al Celio

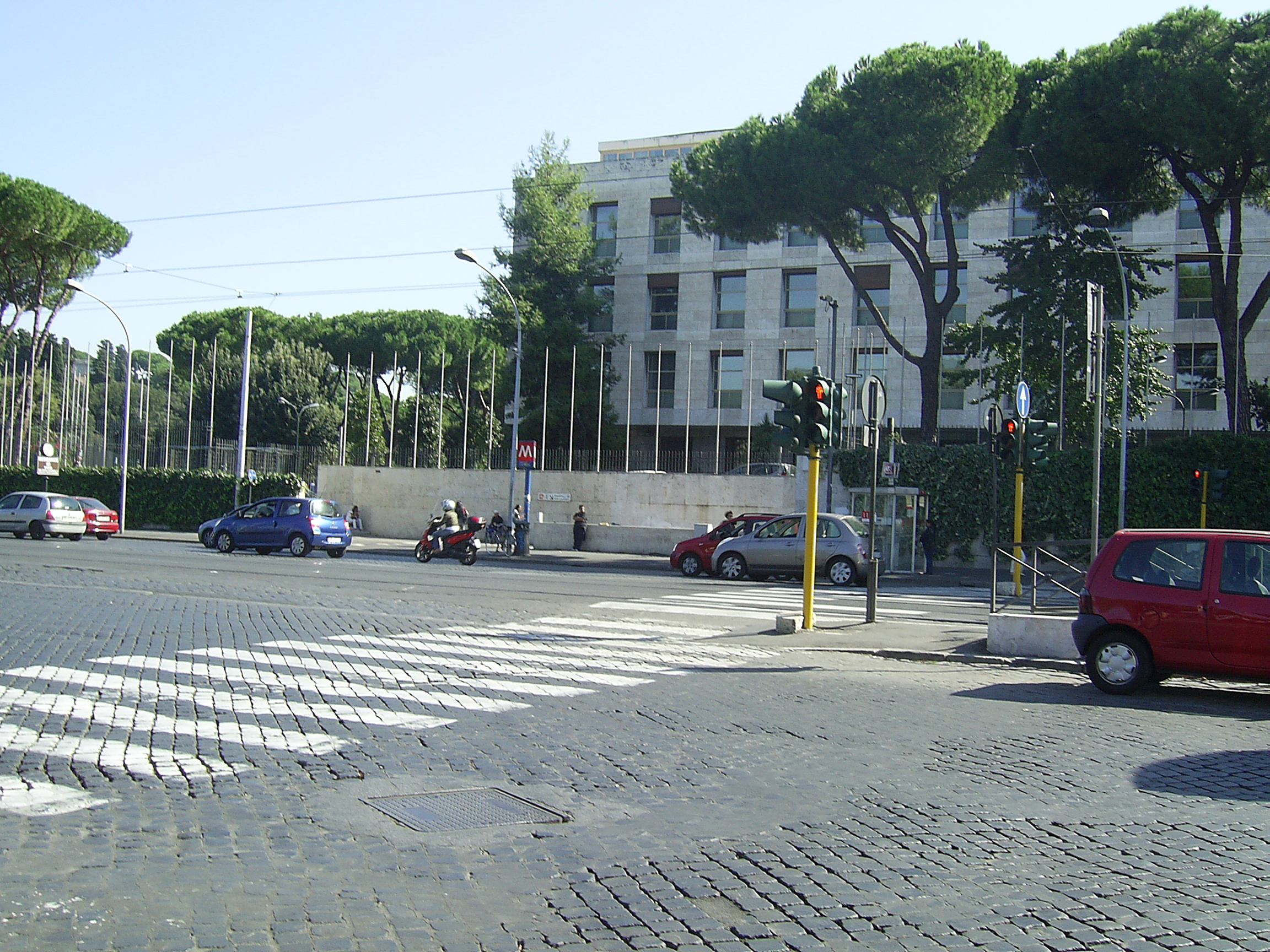
Entrance to the station beside the Food and Agriculture Organization building
