= Roma Porta San Paolo railway station =

Railway station in Rome, Italy

Roma Porta San Paolo
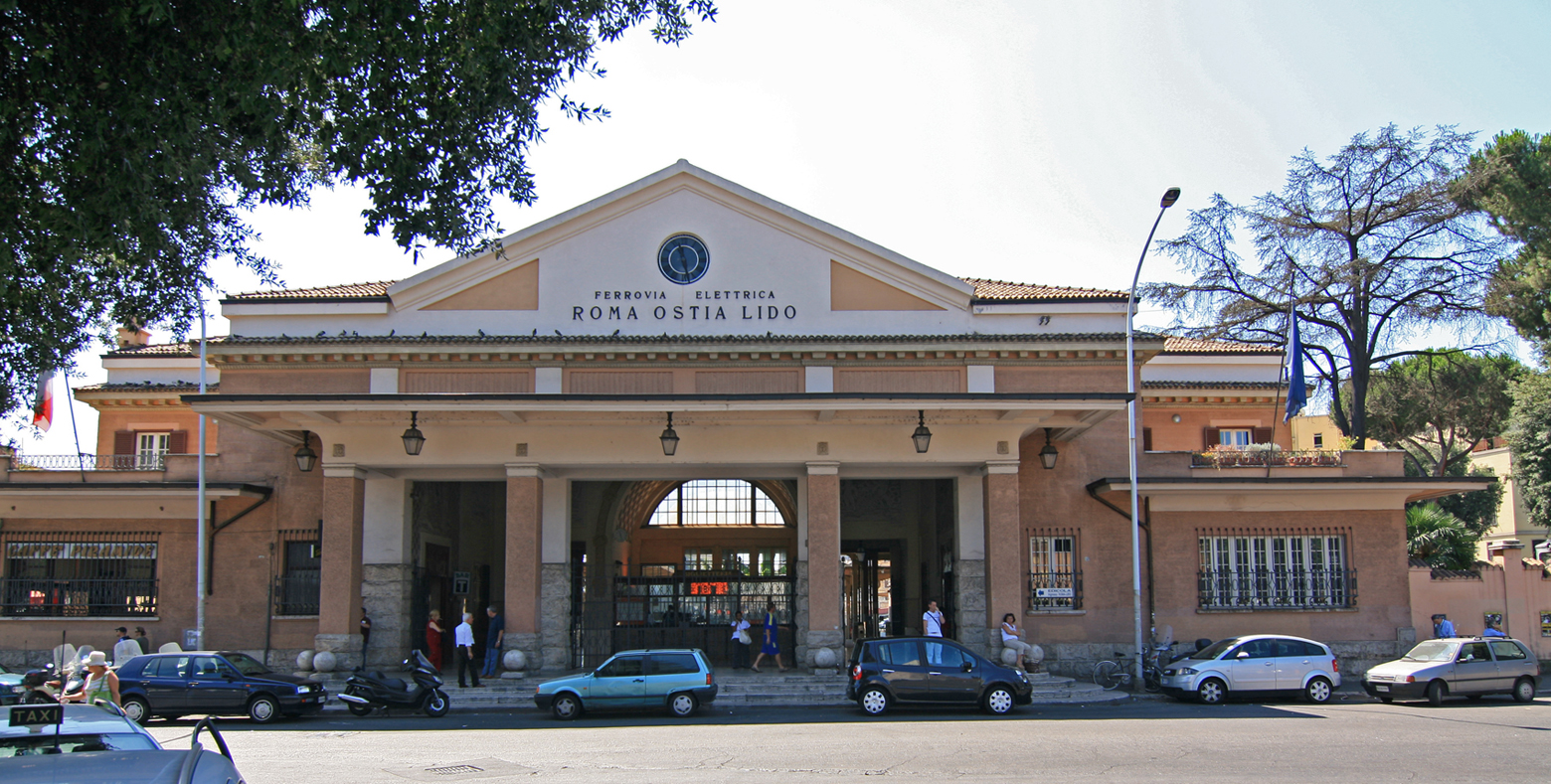
- Roma Porta San Paolo station

General information
- Location: Rome
- Coordinates: 41.875968°N 12.481767°E
- Line: Rome-Ostia
- Tracks: 6
- Connections: Rome Metro: B/B1 Piramide

Construction
- Structure type: at-grade, terminal station

History
- Opened: August 10, 1924

Services
Preceding station	Cotral	Following station
Basilica San Paolo towards Cristoforo Colombo	Metromare	Terminus
Location
- Click on the map for a fullscreen view

Roma Porta San Paolo is the terminal train station of the Rome–Lido railway line in Rome (Italy). The station is connected to the station Piramide of the metro (line B) and to the Roma Ostiense railway station of the Ferrovie dello Stato Italiane. It has six tracks.

The edifice houses the ticket office and service structures, as well as a news-stand and a coffee shop. It also includes the Porta San Paolo Railway Museum.

== History ==
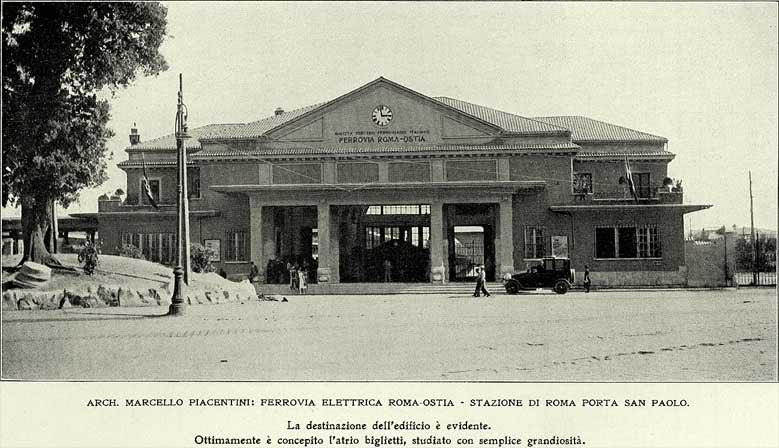
An old picture of the main building of the station.

The building of the station was started, together with the railway, at the beginning of 1919, after the inauguration ceremony of December 30, 1918 in the presence of King Victor Emmanuel III.

The station was designed by Marcello Piacentini. A quite similar one was the Ostia Nuova terminal train station, whose foundation stone was laid on December 10, 1920, also in the presence of the King, and that was destroyed during the war.

The graffiti decorating the interior of the station are works by the Florentine artist Giulio Rosso.

The station and the railway line were inaugurated on August 10, 1924, with a special ride, in which Mussolini – who had become Prime Minister in the meanwhile – took part.

Traffic directions
- Via Marmorata (towards Ponte Sublicio and Trastevere)
  * Viale Aventino (towards Circus Maximus)
  * Via Marco Polo (towards Via Cristoforo Colombo)-EUR and Via Cilicia – Appio-Latino)
  * Via Ostiense (towards the Basilica of Saint Paul Outside the Walls)
Utilities
- ACEA
  * Roma Ostiense railway station
  * Via Marmorata post office
Served Rioni
- Testaccio
  * Ripa and Aventino
  * San Saba
Monuments and churches
- Pyramid of Cestius
  * Porta San Paolo
  * Protestant Cemetery
  * Monte Testaccio
  * Campo Testaccio
  * Centrale Montemartini
  * Porta San Paolo Railway Museum
  * Santa Maria Liberatrice
  * Santa Sabina
  * San Saba

== Services ==
The station has available the following services:

- Ticket office
- Accessibility to disabled persons
- Coffee shop
- News stand
- Museum

== Interchanges ==
=== Metro ===
- Piramide station, Line B.

=== Railway ===
- Roma Ostiense railway station

=== Buses ===
- Terminus station for ATAC bus and tram lines
- Weekdays and holidays: 77 – 775
- Weekdays only: 769
- Night: n3d – n3s
- ATAC passing bus lines
- Weekdays and holidays: 3 – 23 – 30EX – 75 – 83 – 96 – 280 – 715 – 716 – 719 – 780
- Night: nMB – nME – n716
