= Accademia Nazionale di Santa Cecilia Musical Instruments Museum =

Museum in Rome, Italy

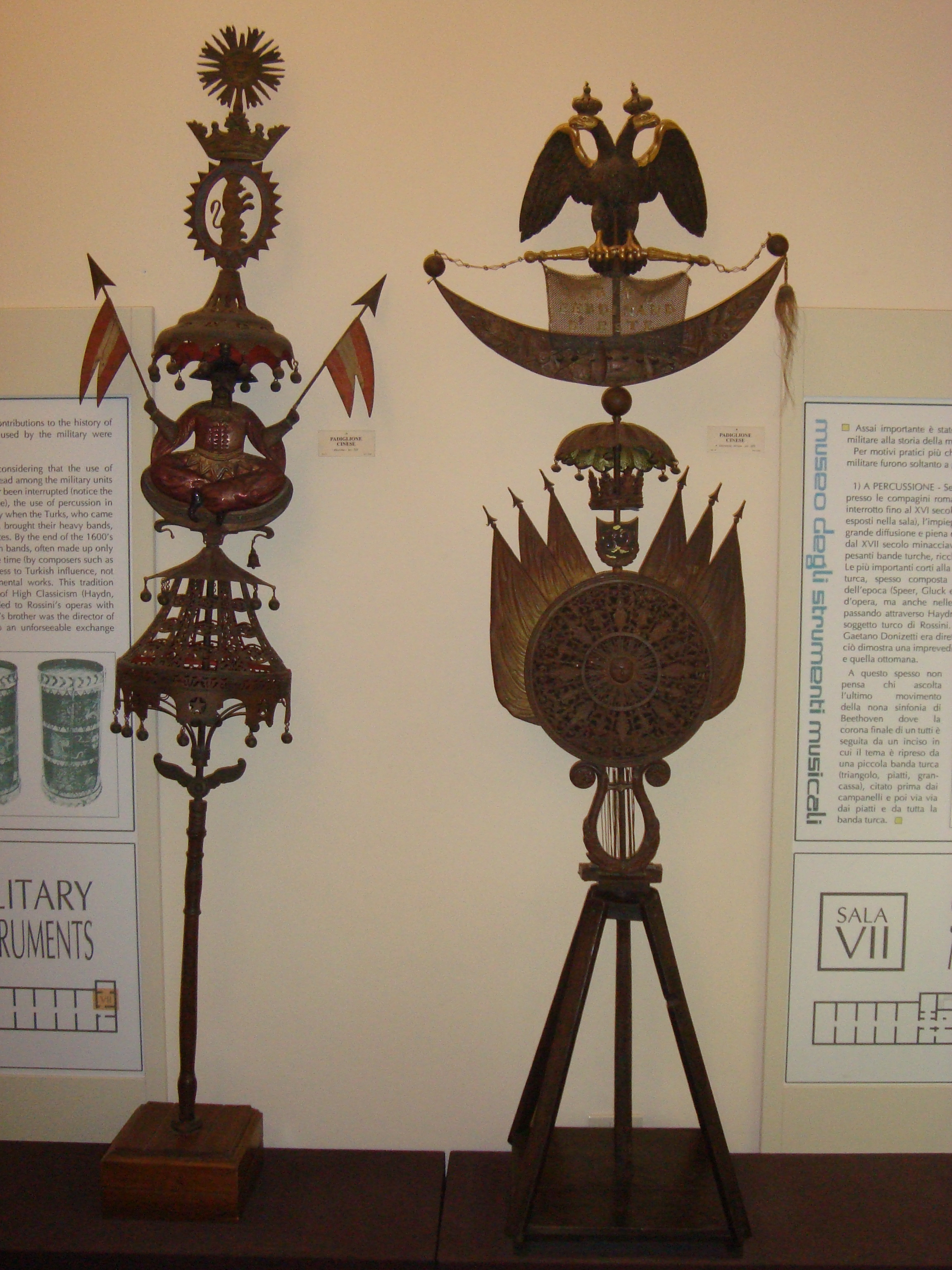
- Pavillons chinois du XIXe siècle
- Click on the map for a fullscreen view
- Location: Rome
- Coordinates: 41°55′44″N 12°28′29″E

The Accademia Nazionale di Santa Cecilia Musical Instruments Museum (MUSA) is the museum holding the instruments collection of musical instruments of the Accademia Nazionale di Santa Cecilia.

== Description ==
Its location is the Auditorium Parco della Musica in Rome, Italy. It was designed by architect Renzo Piano and inaugurated in February 2008.

In the exhibition gallery, some 130 instruments and about 50 luthiery tools are on display in an open-air laboratory where museum luthiers work.

== Collection ==
The exhibition path moves through plucked string instruments, bowed, winds, harps, lyres and also includes keyboards.

Amongst the most important instruments in the collection is the violin known as the 'Tuscan Strad' built by Antonio Stradivari in 1690 together with the four instruments forming the so-called 'Maedicean quintet', built for the Grand Prince Ferdinando de' Medici.

Another notable piece is the viola by David Tecchler, a German born luthier who worked in Rome in the first half of 1700.

His is also one of the fine mandolins from the private collection of queen Margherita di Savoia who left as legacy to the museum.

Users can hire a PDA with an audio tour of the museum presenting twenty examples with pictures of the instruments.

== See also ==
- List of music museums

Preceded by Porta San Paolo Railway Museum	Landmarks of Rome; Accademia Nazionale di Santa Cecilia Musical Instruments Museum	Succeeded by Venanzo Crocetti Museum
