= Piramide (Rome Metro) =

Rome metro station

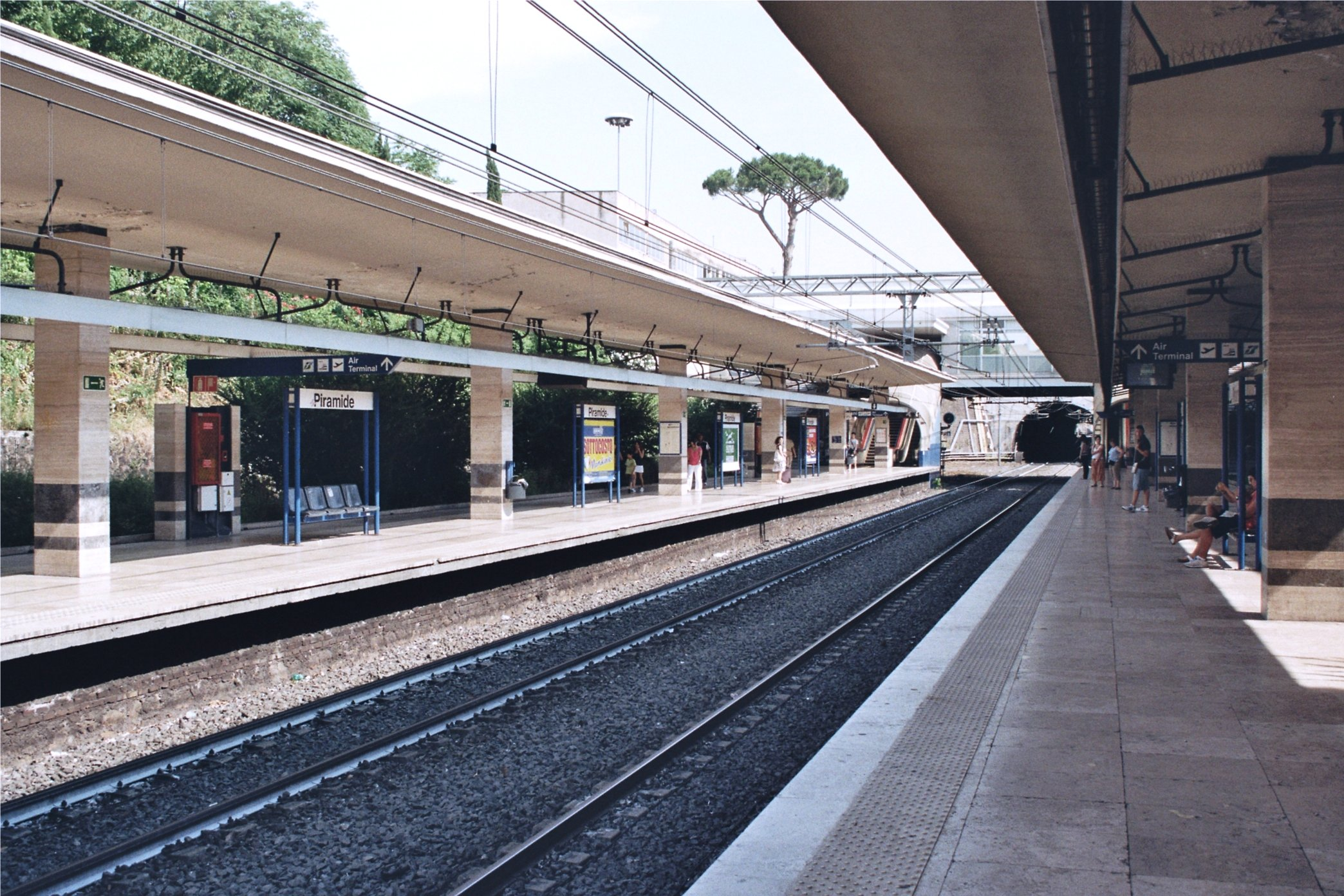

General information
- Coordinates: 41°52′32″N 12°28′56″E
- Owner: ATAC
- Connections: Porta San Paolo railway station Ostiense railway station

Construction
- Structure type: Aboveground

History
- Opened: 10 February 1955; 71 years ago

Services
Preceding station	Rome Metro	Following station
Garbatella towards Laurentina	Line B	Circo Massimo towards Rebibbia or Jonio
Location
- Click on the map to see marker

Piramide is a station on Line B of the Rome Metro. It was opened on 10 February 1955 and is sited on Piazzale Ostiense (across which is the Pyramid of Cestius that gives the station its name) just outside Porta San Paolo, in the Ostiense quarter. Its atrium houses mosaics that have won the Artemetro Roma by Enrico Castellani (Italy) and Beverly Pepper (United States). The station has escalators.

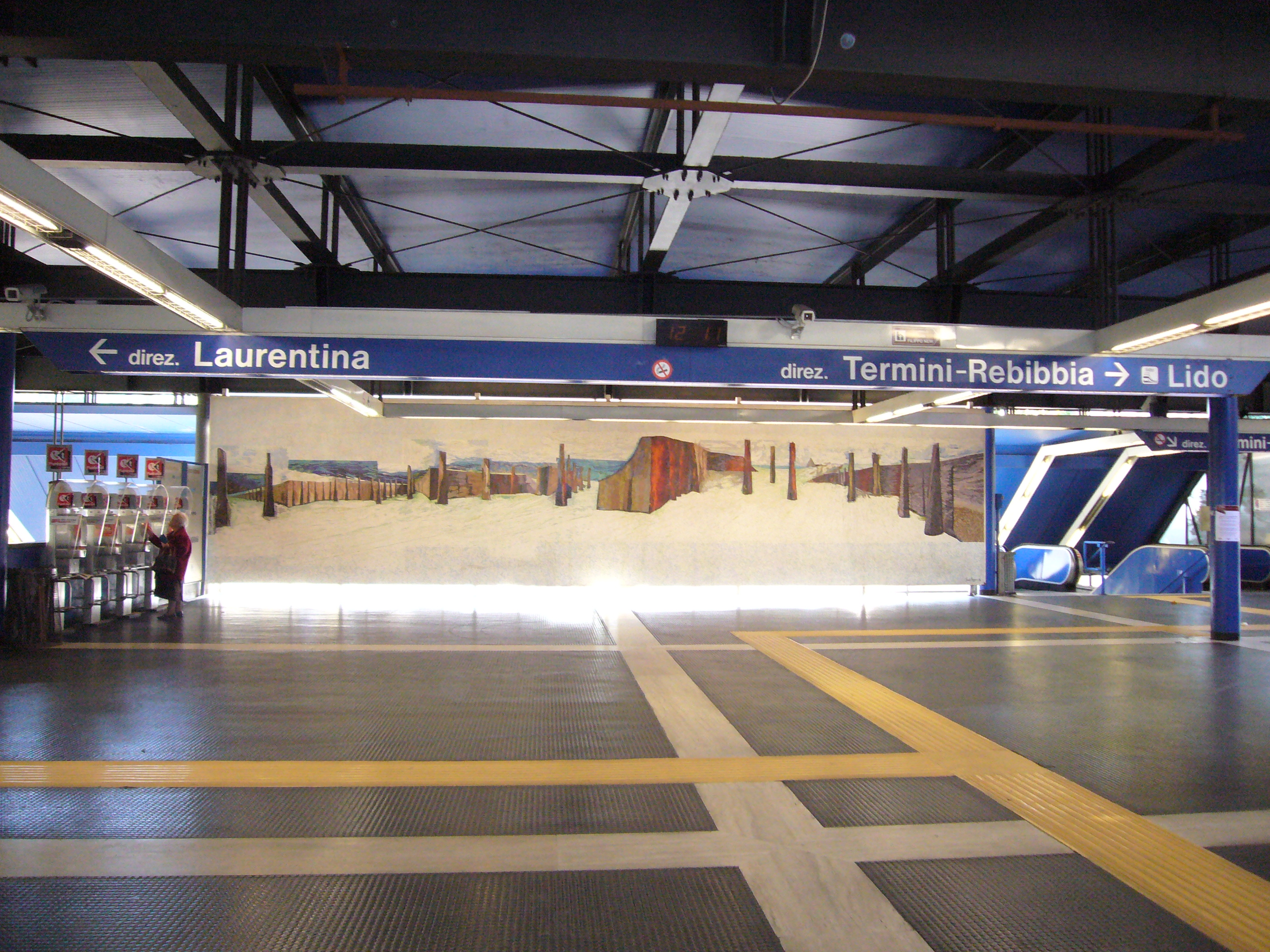
Beverley Pepper mosaic

== Connections ==
Alongside the Metro station is the Porta San Paolo station on the Ferrovia Roma-Lido. The Stazione Ostiense is connected to the metro station via an underpass - from here run the FR1, FR3 and FR5 mainline services.

== Surroundings ==
- Acea headquarters
- Stazione di Roma Ostiense
- via Marmorata post office

=== Direction of traffic ===
- Via Marmorata (towards Ponte Sublicio and Trastevere)
- Viale Aventino (towards il Circo Massimo)
- Via Marco Polo (towards via Cristoforo Colombo-EUR and via Cilicia-Appio Latino)
- Via Ostiense (towards the Basilica di San Paolo fuori le mura)

=== Rioni and quarters ===
- Rione Testaccio
- Rioni Ripa and Aventino
- Rione San Saba

=== Monuments and churches ===
- Pyramid of Cestius
- Porta San Paolo
- Protestant Cemetery
- Monte dei cocci
- Campo Testaccio
- Centrale Montemartini
- Porta San Paolo Railway Museum
- Santa Maria Liberatrice
- Chiesa di Santa Sabina
- Chiesa di San Saba

== Gallery ==
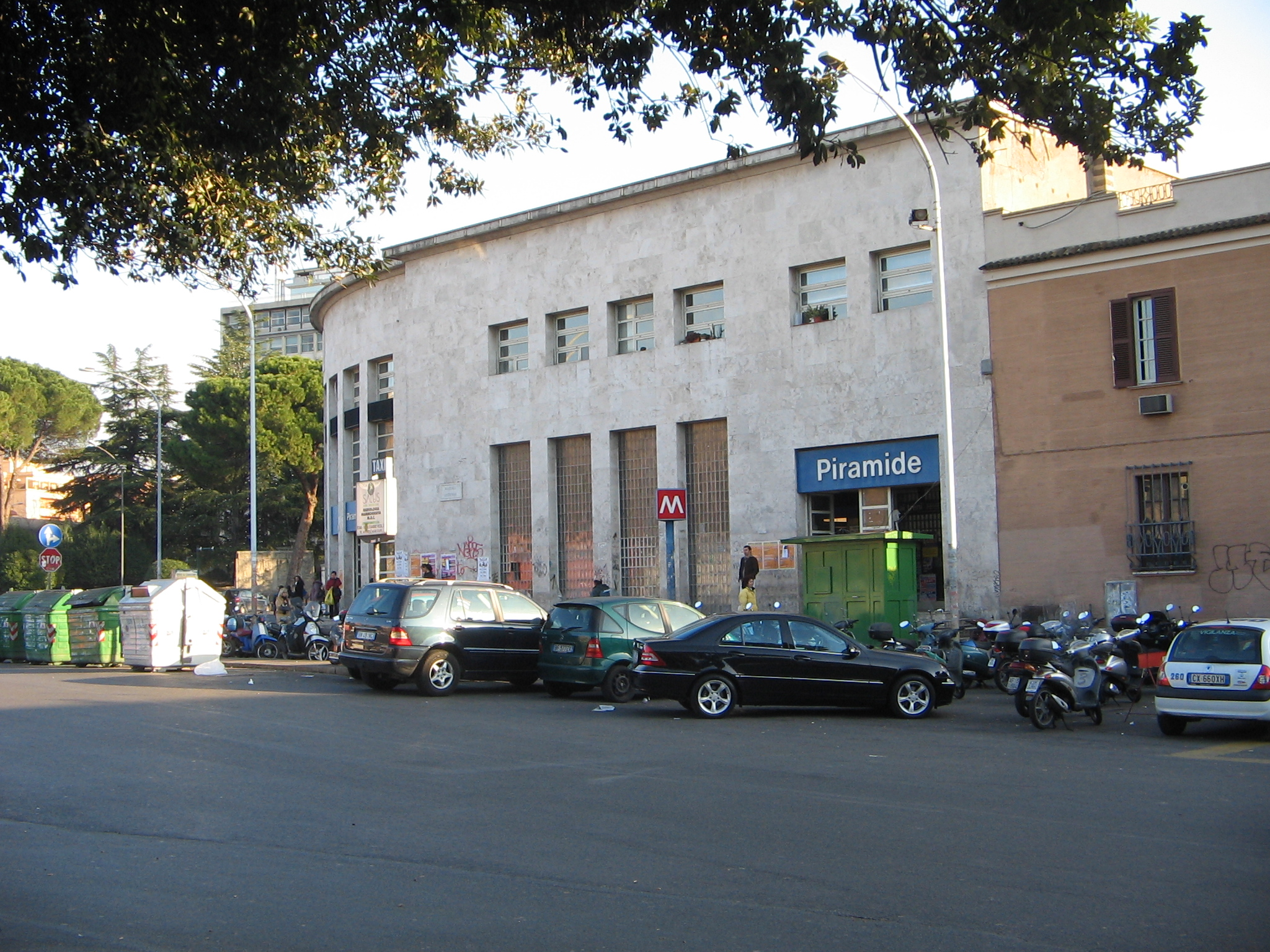
The piazzale

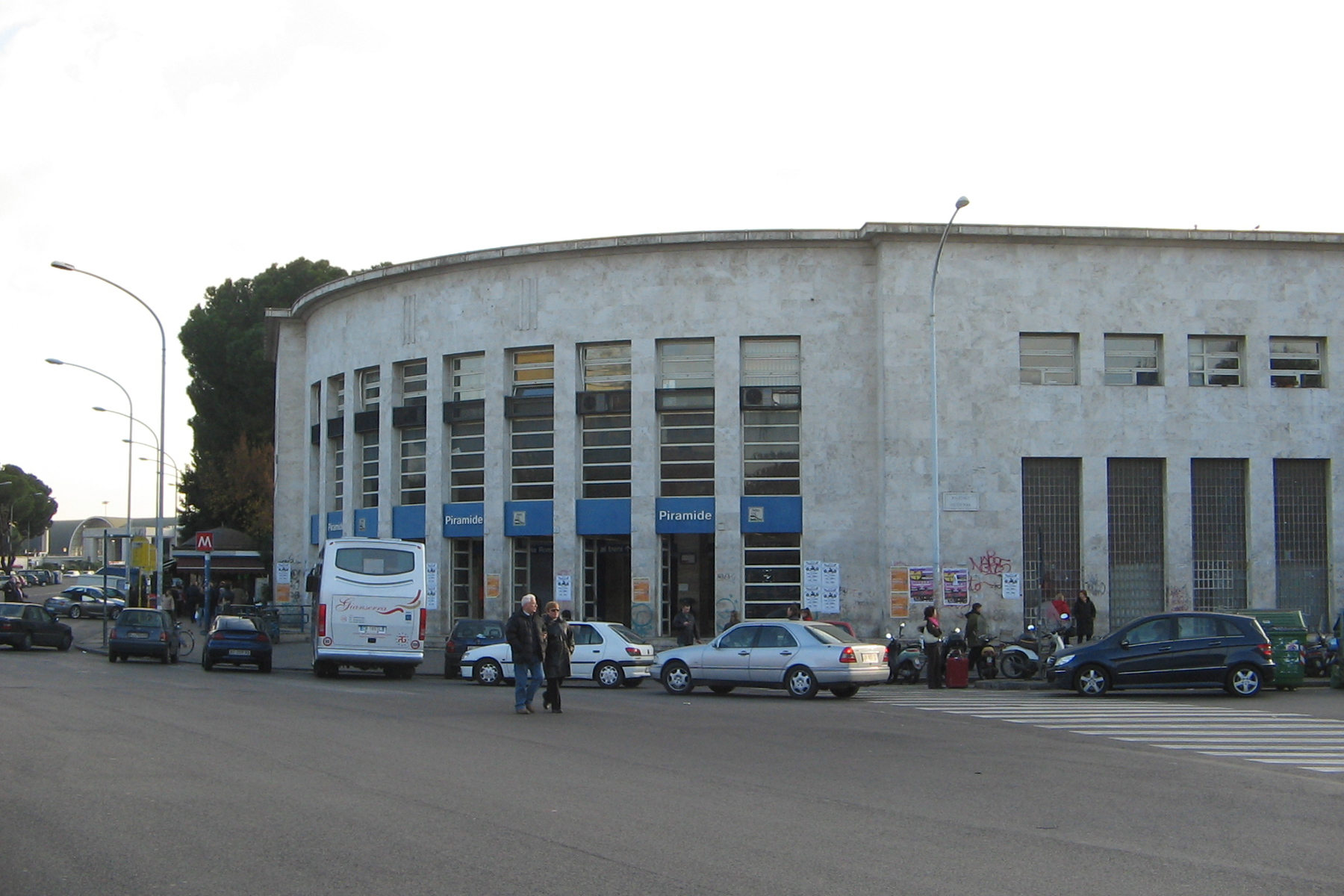
Facade
