= Rome–Lido railway =

Railway line in Italy

Roma–Lido

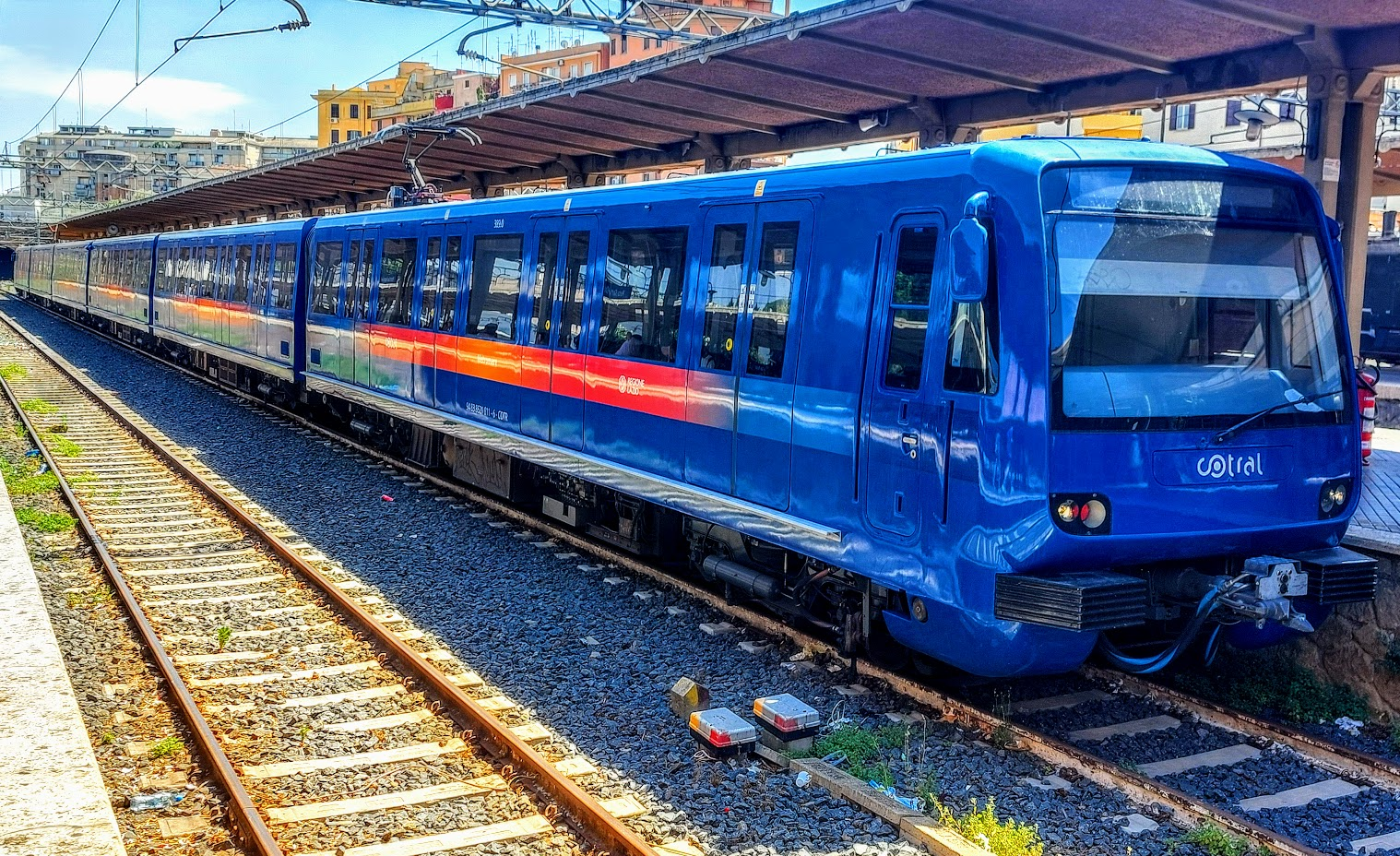
- MA300 train at Roma Porta San Paolo

Overview
- Status: Operational
- Owner: Region of Lazio
- Line number: 1
- Locale: Rome, Italy
- Termini: Roma Porta San Paolo; Cristoforo Colombo
- Stations: 14
- Website: Cotral Metromare

Service
- Type: Rapid transit / Commuter rail
- Operator(s): ASTRAL, Cotral

History
- Opened: 10 August 1924

Technical
- Line length: 28.3 km (17.6 mi)
- Track gauge: 1,435 mm (4 ft 8 1/2 in)
- Electrification: 1,500 V DC
Route map
Map of the Rome–Lido railway.

The Rome–Lido railway, branded as Metromare, is an urban railway line connecting the Porta San Paolo Station in Rome to Lido di Ostia, Rome's seaside neighborhood. The railway is 28.3 km (17.6 mi) long and stops at 14 stations.

== History ==
=== Early proposals ===
A permanent transport link between Rome and the Tyrrhenian coast became necessary at the end of the 19th century due to a significant population increase in the coastal area. The first railway project was proposed in 1868 by engineer Felipe Costa and was approved by the Papal States, which ruled the region at the time. Roman nobles raised 9 million lire to finance a private railway venture, but the project was abandoned following the Capture of Rome in 1870 and the subsequent fall of the Papal States.

Later, a tramway line was discussed to connect the growing coastal town, but it was deemed inadequate for the expected traffic volume. Between 1900 and the outbreak of the First World War, several preliminary projects were evaluated. In 1906, the City Council of Rome established a commission to study the connection, which proposed a monumental 80-metre (260 ft) wide access avenue. The following year, the Chamber of Commerce of Rome approved a budget of 15,000 lire for engineering plans, aiming to open a railway line for the 50th anniversary of the Unification of Italy in 1911. A temporary agreement signed in 1909 between the City of Rome and the Belgian company S. & C. Baschwitz ultimately failed to materialize.

=== Construction and inauguration ===
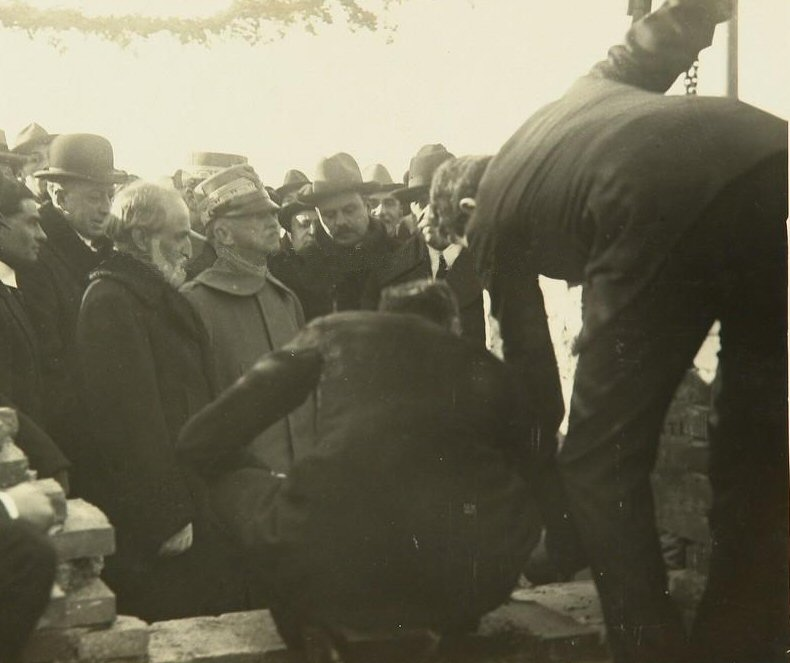
King Victor Emmanuel III laying the first stone of Ostia station on 10 December 1921.

In 1913, engineer Paolo Orlando promoted the establishment of the company "La Marina di Roma", which proposed a standard-gauge railway using electric traction. While early designs planned the Roman terminus at Via Annibaldi (between the Colosseum and Via Cavour), Porta San Paolo was ultimately selected as the main terminal.

The initial design utilized a third rail power supply and received government approval in 1913. The final draft, approved in 1915, modified the system to use a 2400 V DC overhead line. Law no. 550 of 27 April 1916 established the final construction parameters and granted a state subsidy of 12,864 lire per kilometer.

The outbreak of World War I delayed construction, which officially began on 20 December 1918. King Victor Emmanuel III attended the ground-breaking ceremony and laid the first stone of the future Ostia station on 10 December 1921.

Under significant political pressure from Head of Government Benito Mussolini, construction was accelerated, and the line was inaugurated on 10 August 1924. The inaugural train, carrying Mussolini, was hauled by a FS Class Gr. 910.045 steam locomotive and consisted of four passenger cars, a baggage car, and an observation car. Regular public service commenced the following day with ten daily train pairs and a travel time of 50 minutes. Double-tracking and complete electrification were finished on 21 April 1925, reducing travel times to approximately 30 minutes.

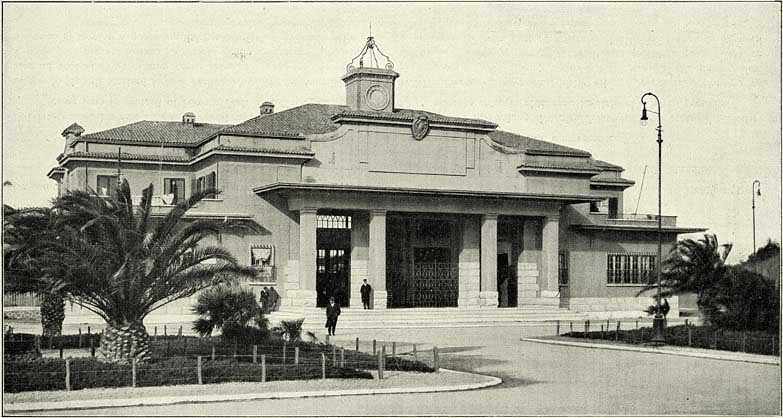
Ostia station during the 1920s.

=== Expansion and wartime damage ===
The railway reached its peak ridership during the 1930s, operating departures every 15 minutes. The infrastructure served as a major catalyst for the urban expansion of Ostia and the Roman coastline. In 1941, operations were transferred to STEFER (Società delle Tramvie e Ferrovie Elettriche di Roma).

Between 1943 and 1944, World War II caused severe damage to both Rome and Ostia. The heaviest destruction occurred on the coastal section past Acilia, where retreating German forces completely demolished the railway infrastructure. Services were repeatedly suspended, and lines were restricted as Ostia was evacuated and isolated.

=== Post-war reconstruction and modernization ===
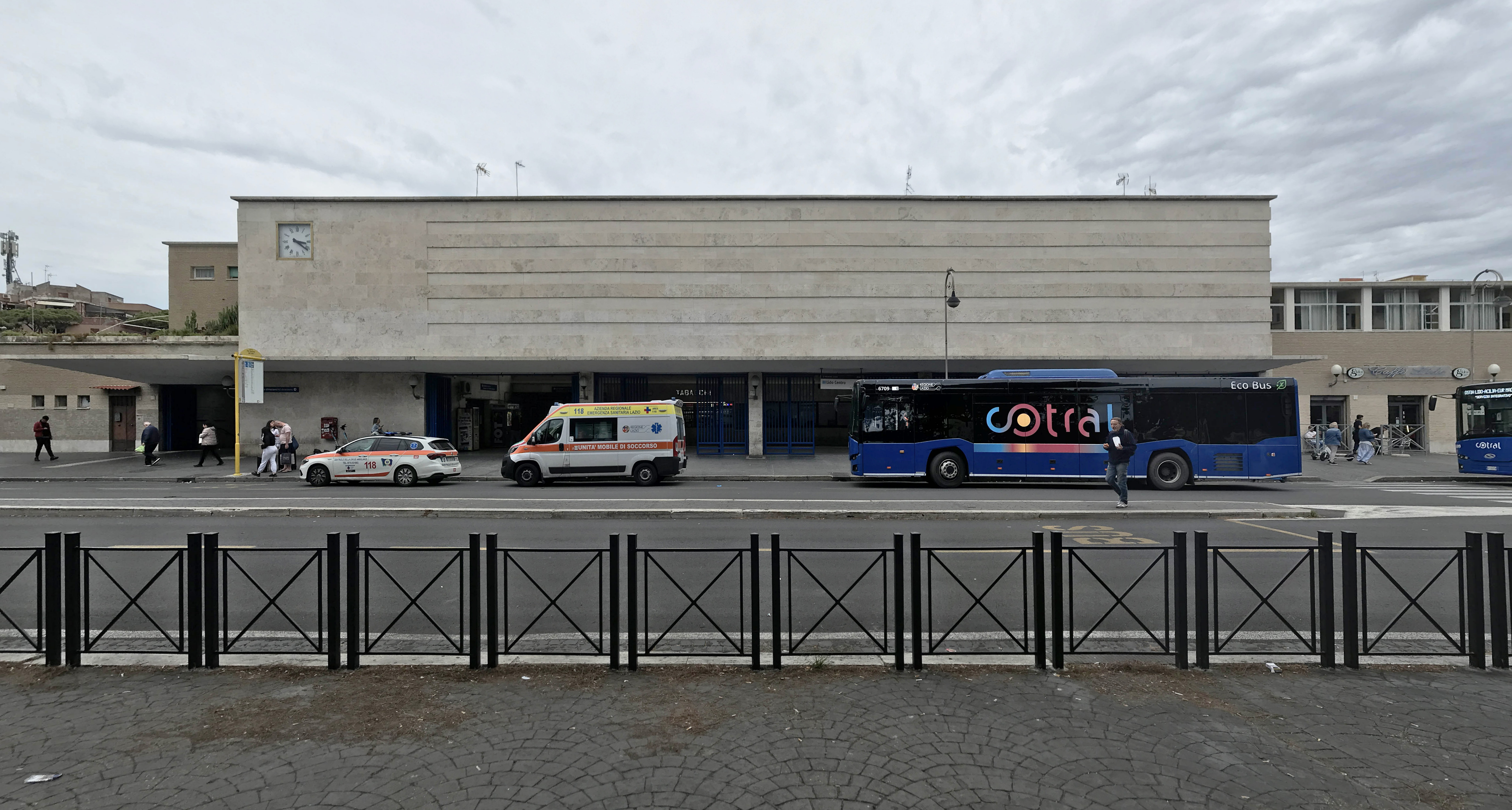
The new Lido di Ostia Centro station opened on 4 June 1951.

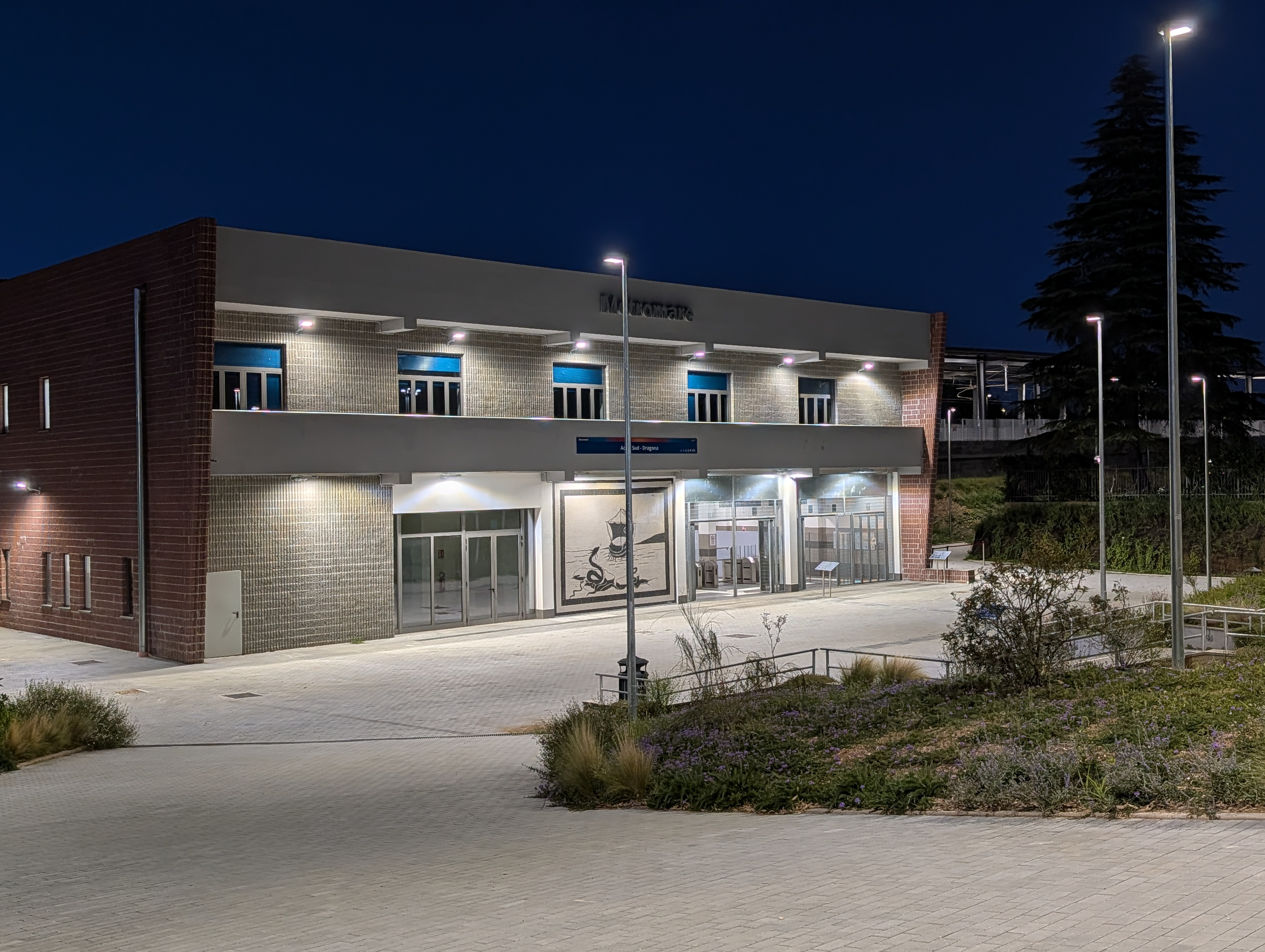
Acilia Sud–Dragona station opened on 11 August 2025.

Reconstruction efforts began on 21 September 1944, and the line reopened fully on 24 December 1945. The original Ostia terminal was heavily damaged and subsequently demolished; the new station layout was moved back by 300 metres (980 ft). Post-war expansion extended the tracks toward Ostia Levante, leading to the creation of the Stella Polare and Castelfusano stations. On 4 June 1951, the new Lido di Ostia Centro station opened.

During the 1950s, the growing popularity of Ostia as a seaside resort caused passenger demand to surge. Class MR 100 trainsets entered service in 1954, followed by the MR 200 series in 1956. The opening of the Rome Metro Line B allowed Magliana station (now EUR Magliana) to operate as a shared transit hub, enabling Roma–Lido trains to extend their service directly into central Rome at Termini station. On 25 August 1960, the extension to Cristoforo Colombo station was completed alongside the opening of Tor di Valle station. Casal Bernocchi station opened in the summer of 1972 to accommodate new residential neighborhoods.

Ridership grew substantially over the following decades as the direct connection to Termini served both tourists and a rising number of daily commuters. The fleet was reinforced with MR 300 units in 1976 and six 500-series trainsets built by Fiat Ferroviaria in 1987. On 9 September 1989, the Rome terminus was temporarily cut back to Magliana station to allow for extensive modernization works at Porta San Paolo.

=== Recent developments ===
In the 21st century, management of the line transitioned through several regional and municipal transport authorities. As part of a regional modernization plan for the suburban network, the new Acilia Sud–Dragona station opened to the public on 11 August 2025.

== Service ==
The service begins daily at 5:15 and ends at 23:30, providing up to eight trains per hour during peak time.

During the summer season, service frequencies are increased to accommodate the surge of tourists traveling to the beaches of Ostia. The average travel time for the entire journey between Roma Porta San Paolo and Cristoforo Colombo is approximately 37 minutes.

After daily rail operations conclude for the night, the line is replaced by the nME night bus service (formerly designated as N3). Unlike the train, the night bus starts its route further north in central Rome at Piazza Venezia, rather than Porta San Paolo (Piazzale Ostiense/Piramide), before running the length of the line down to Cristoforo Colombo.

== Route and infrastructure ==
The railway is entirely double-tracked and operates on a dedicated right-of-way, completely segregated from other national rail networks and municipal tram services.

Within the urban center of Rome, the Roma–Lido line interchanges with Rome Metro Line B at three stations: Piramide (via Porta San Paolo), Basilica San Paolo, and EUR Magliana. After leaving the consolidated urban area, the line serves the suburban neighborhoods of Tor di Valle, Vitinia, Casal Bernocchi, Centro Giano, Acilia, and Ostia Antica. It then enters the coastal town of Ostia proper, where it serves five dedicated stations before terminating at Cristoforo Colombo.

== Future proposals ==
Proposals have been put forward to fully integrate the railway into the Rome Metro network as Line E. This plan involves converting the infrastructure to full rapid transit standards and potentially extending the service through the city center to Jonio by utilizing existing Line B tracks and infrastructure. Following the 2022 rebranding of the line as "Metromare" under regional management, discussions regarding its definitive technological conversion into a proper metro line have remained part of Rome's long-term sustainable mobility guidelines (PUMS).

== Gallery ==
=== Stations ===
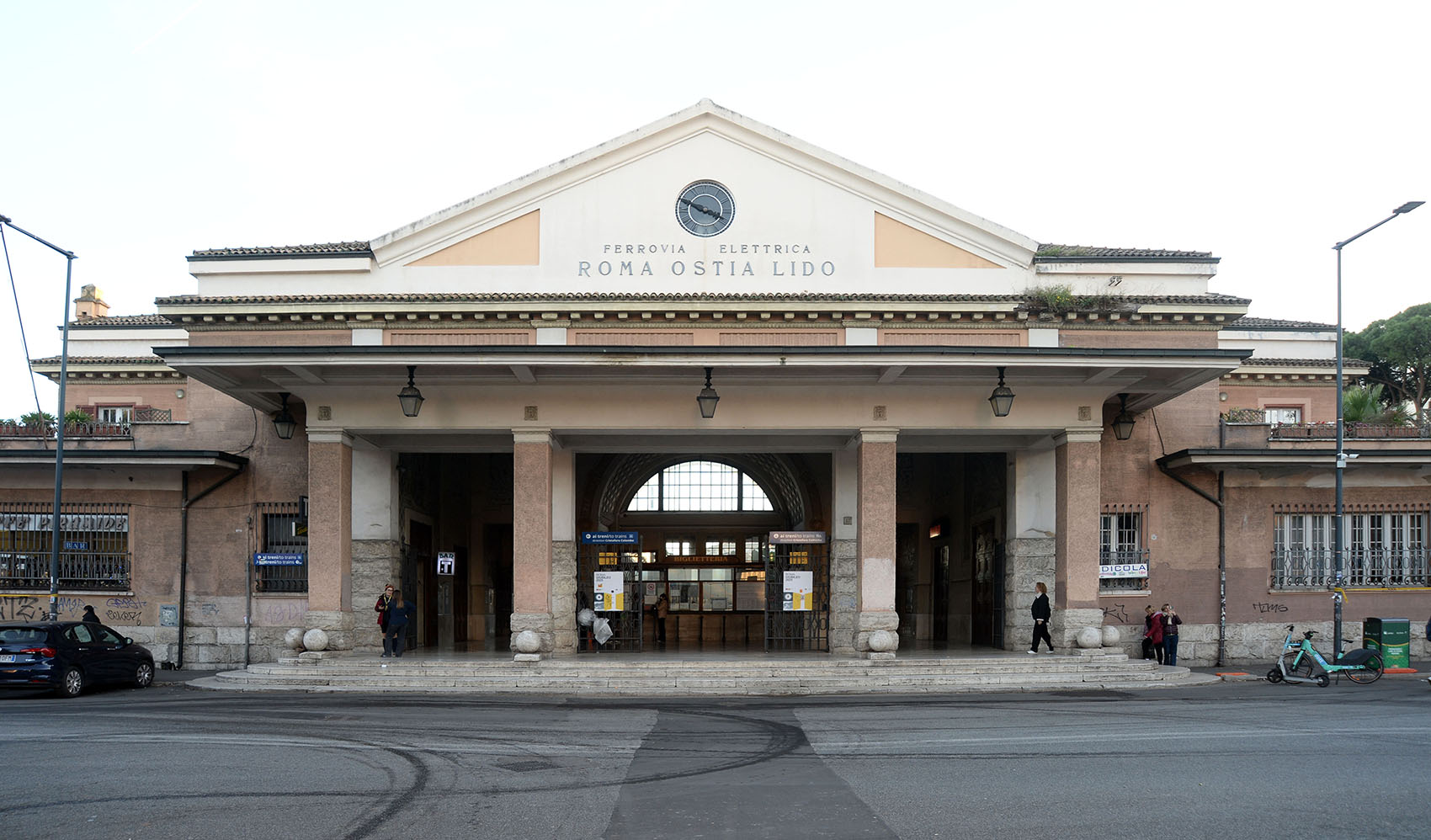
Porta San Paolo

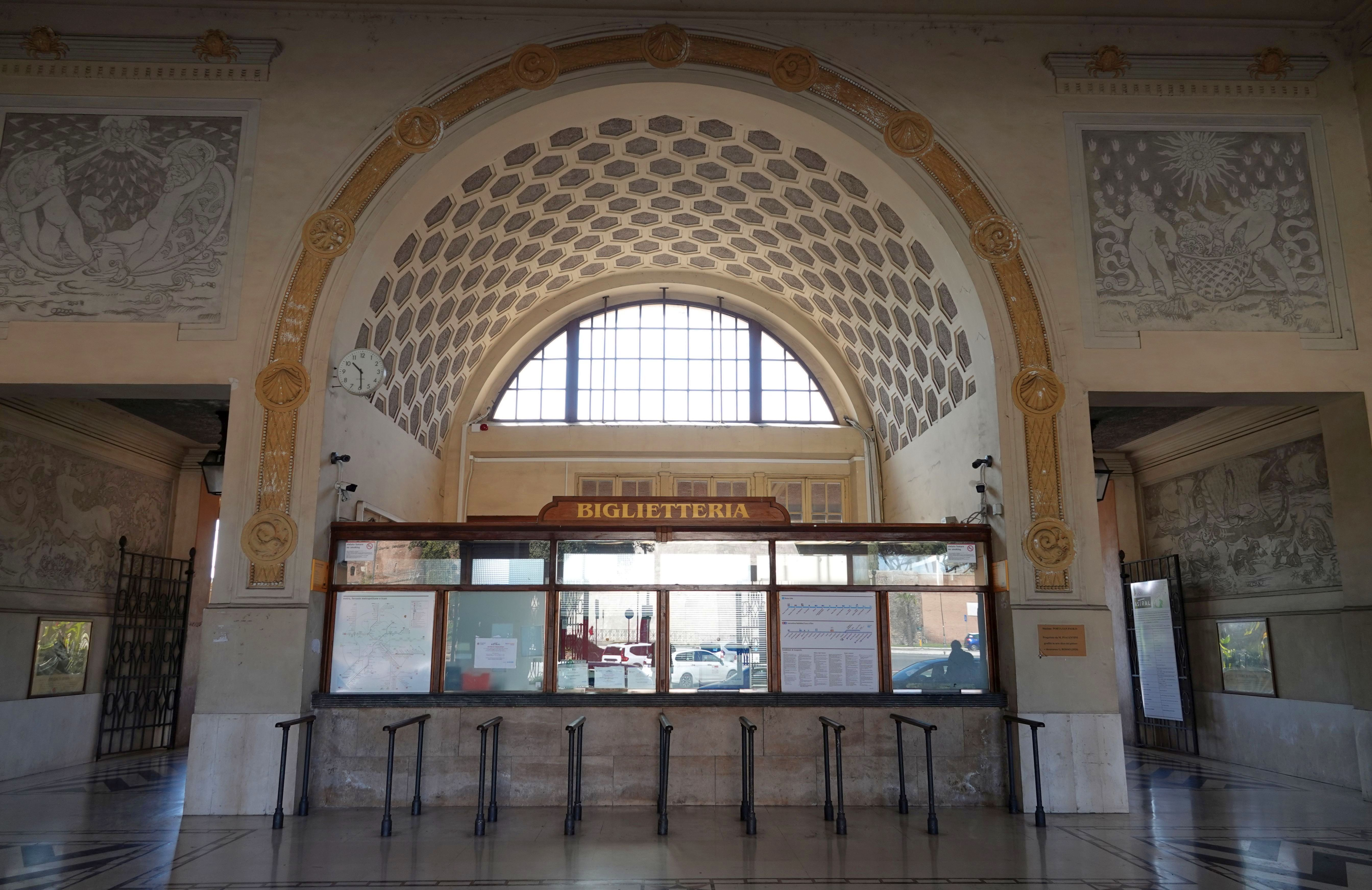
Porta San Paolo ticket office

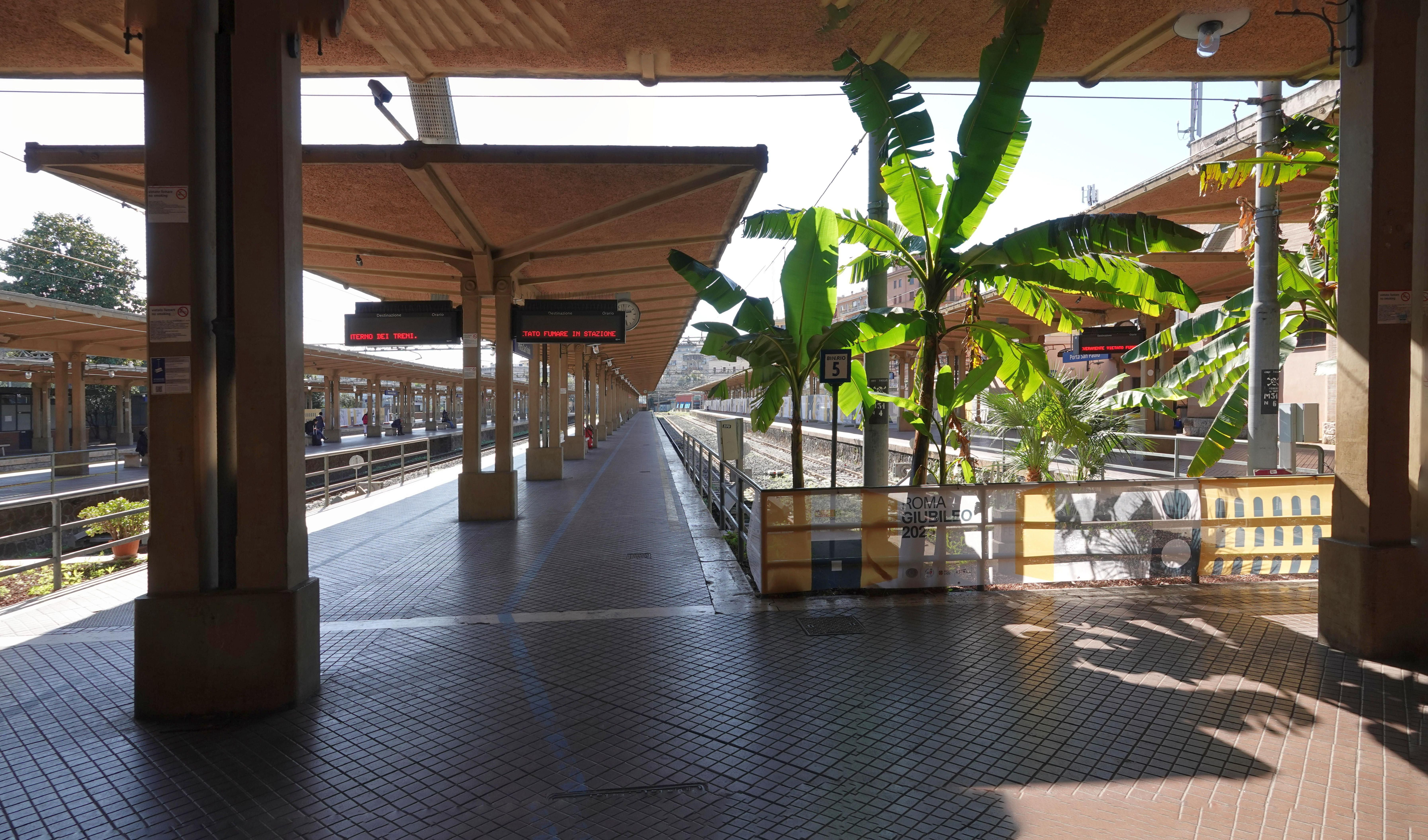
Porta San Paolo platforms

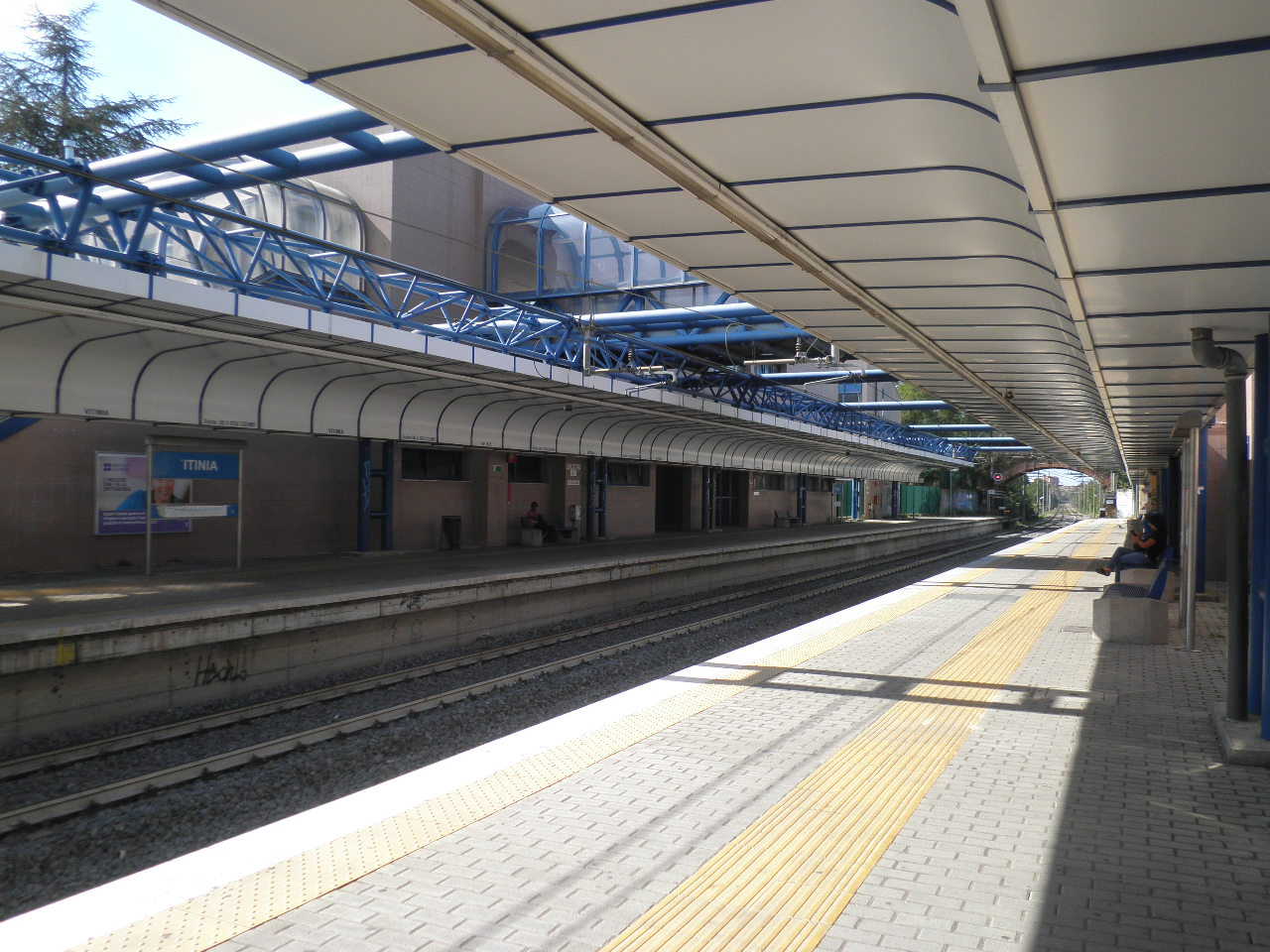
Vitinia

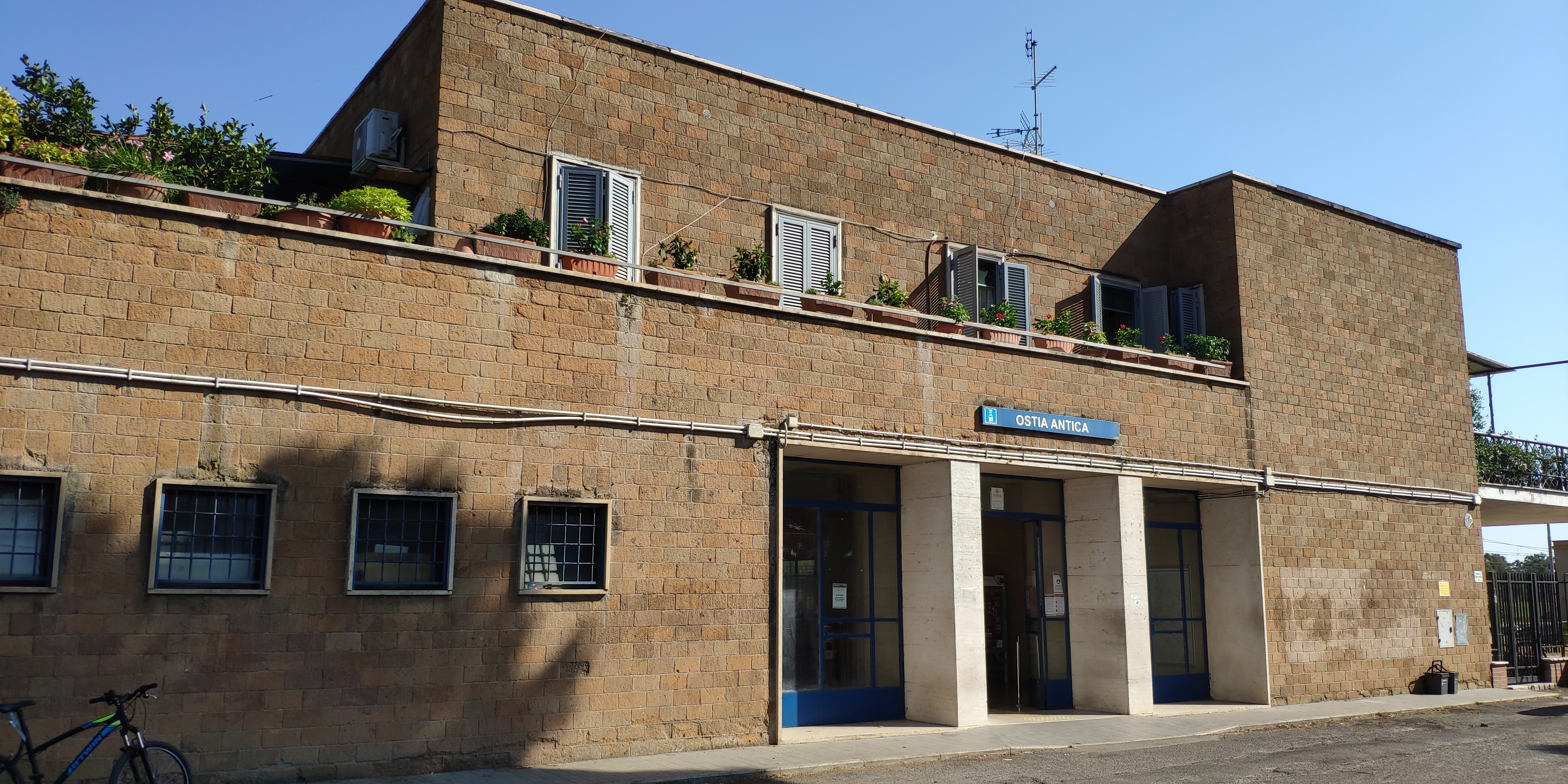
Ostia Antica

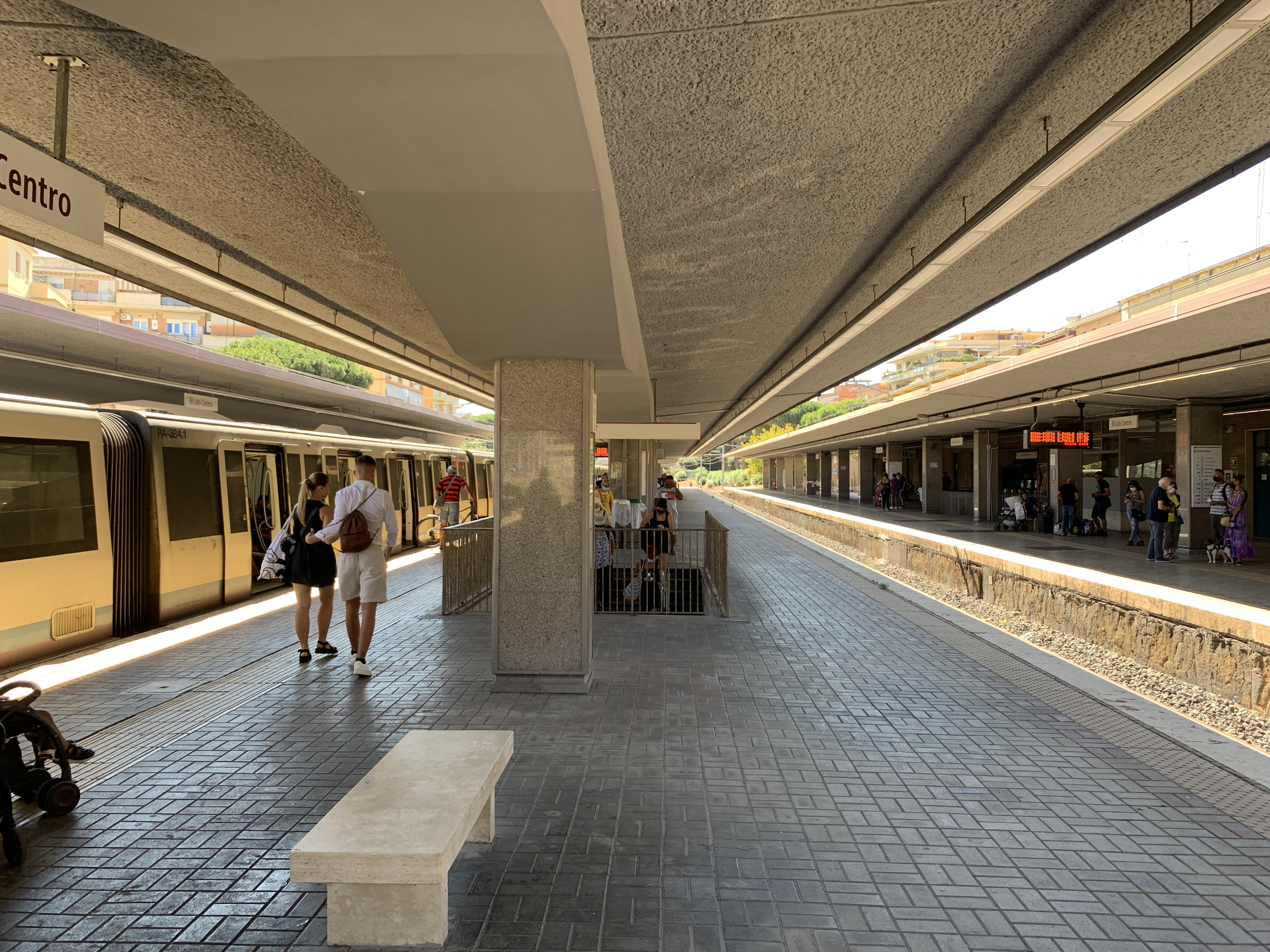
Lido di Ostia Centro

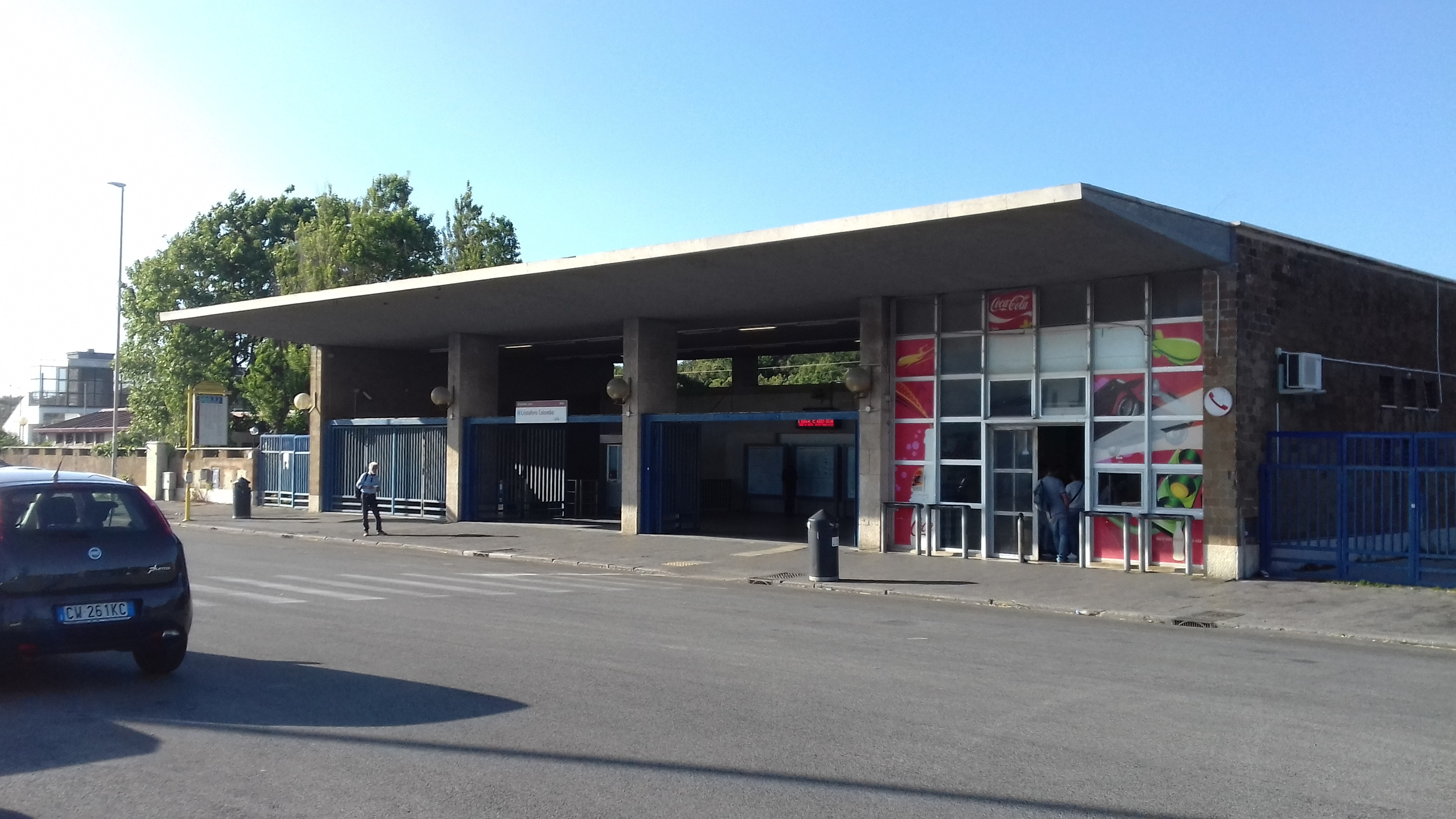
Cristoforo Colombo
