= Roma Tuscolana railway station =

Italian railway station

Roma Tuscolana
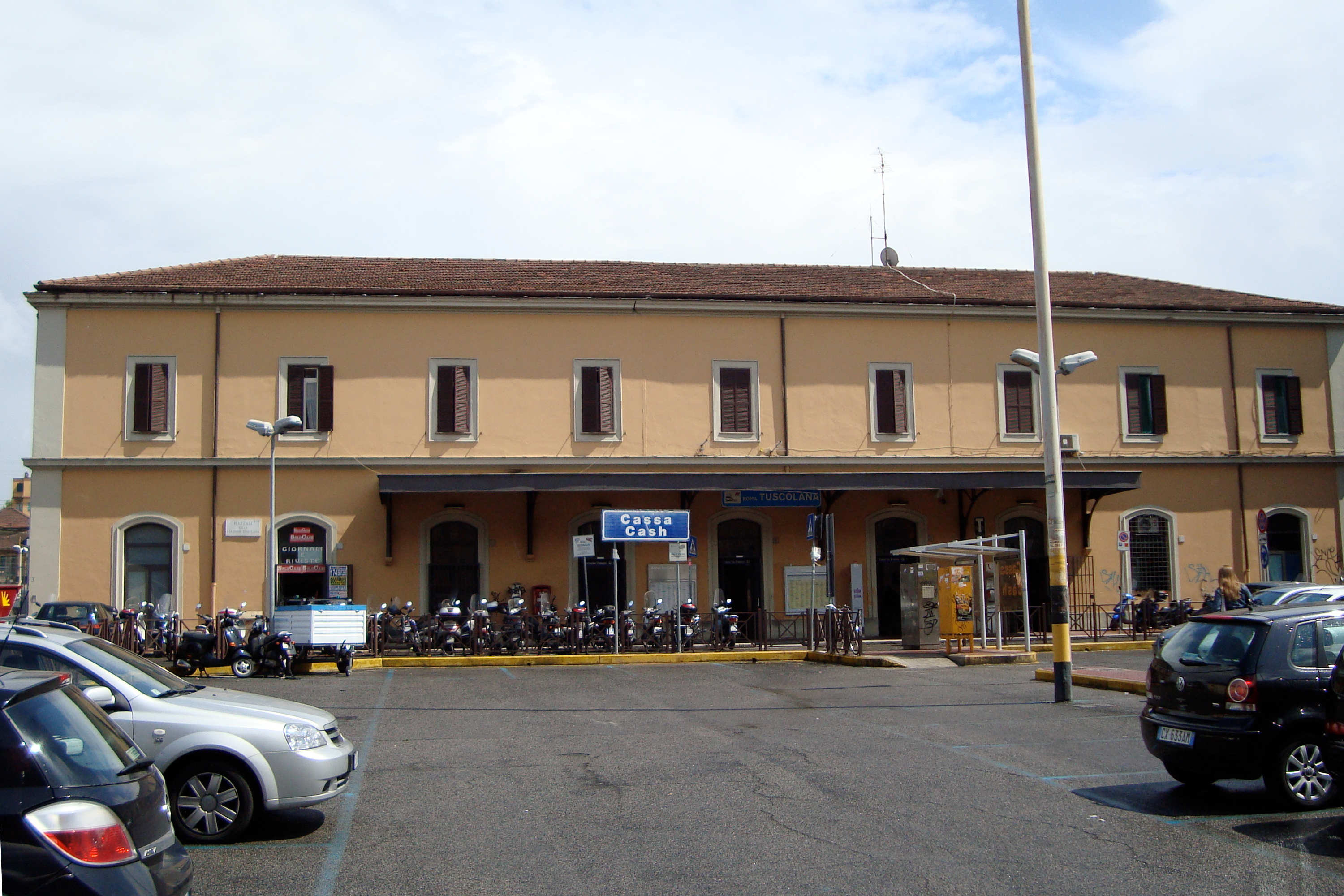
- The passenger building.

General information
- Location: Piazza della stazione Tuscolana 9 Roma RM; Rome, Rome, Lazio; Italy
- Coordinates: 41°52′46″N 12°31′24″E,
- Operator: Rete Ferroviaria Italiana
- Lines: Pisa-Livorno-Grosseto–Roma; Orte-Fiumicino Aeroporto; Roma Tiburtina-Viterbo; Roma Termini-Civitavecchia
- Distance: 3.082 km (1.915 mi) from Roma Termini
- Train operators: Trenitalia
- Connections: Underground Line A; Bus Stop; Taxi Stand

Other information
- Classification: Silver
Location
- Click on the map for a fullscreen view

Roma Tuscolana railway station (Italian: Stazione di Roma Tuscolana) is a major station serving the city and comune of Rome, Italy. It forms part of the Pisa–Livorno–Rome railway and the Rome–Fiumicino railway.

The station is currently managed by Rete Ferroviaria Italiana (RFI). Train services are operated by Trenitalia. Each of these companies is a subsidiary of Ferrovie dello Stato (FS), Italy's state-owned rail company.

== Location ==
Roma Tuscolana railway station is situated at Piazza della stazione Tuscolana, just to the southeast of the city centre, in the quartiere (English: district) of Tuscolano.

== Passenger and train movements ==
Ferrovie regionali del Lazio FL3 and FL5 commuter lines pass through the station.

== Interchanges ==
- Ponte Lungo station on Line A on the Rome Metro.
- 16 – 85 – 412 – 590 – 665 – 671 – nMA
- Regional trains of Lazio Regional Railways
- Regional train to Rome Fiumicino Airport

== See also ==
- History of rail transport in Italy
- List of railway stations in Lazio
- Rail transport in Italy
- Railway stations in Italy

Preceding station	Lazio regional railways	Following station
Roma Tiburtina towards Orte	FL1	Roma Ostiense towards Fiumicino Aeroporto
Roma Termini Terminus	FL5	Roma Ostiense towards Civitavecchia
