= FL3 (Lazio regional railways) =

Viterbo–Roma Tiburtina
- FL3
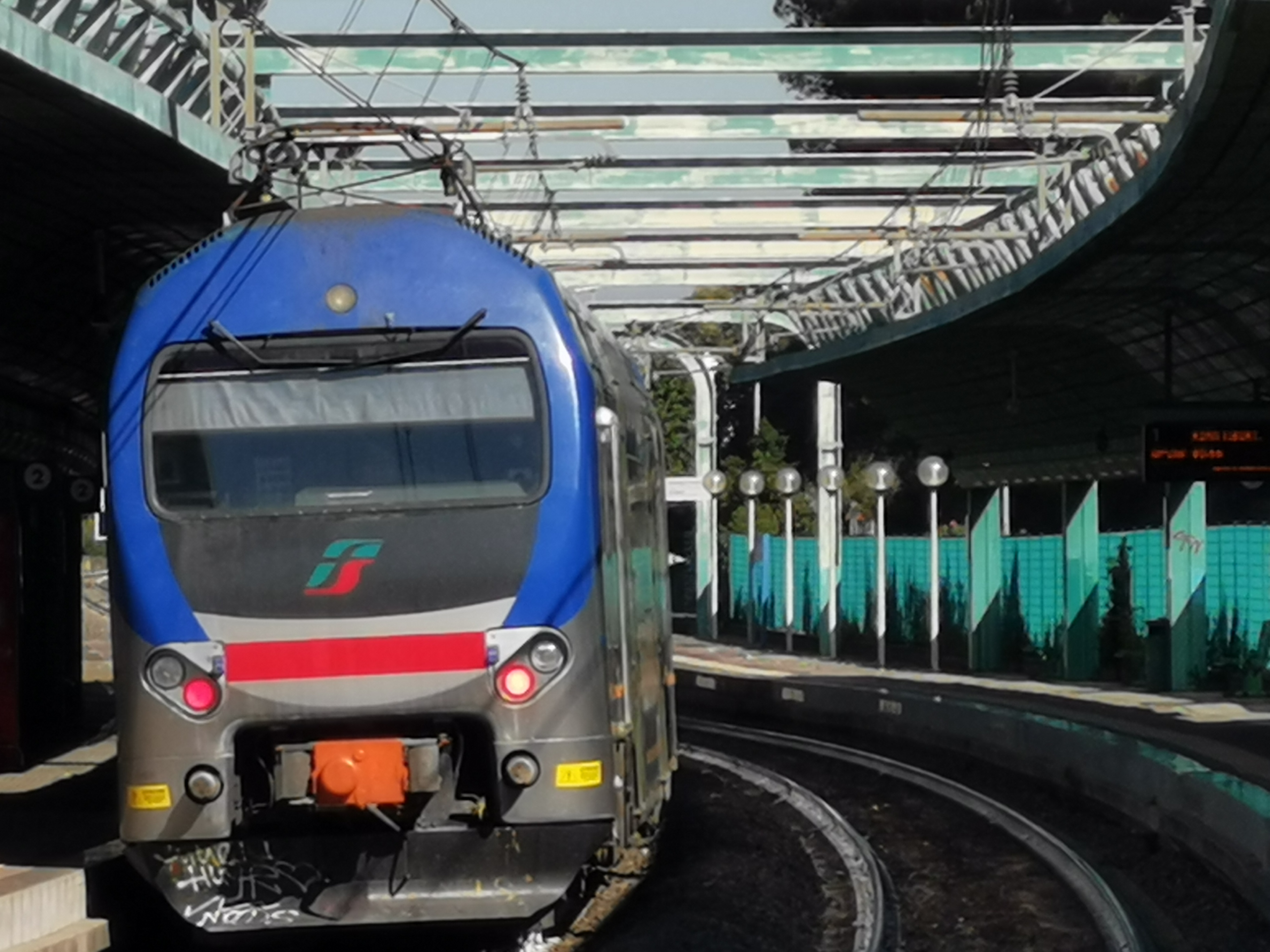
- A TAF train at Roma San Filippo Neri station.

Overview
- Status: Operational
- Line number: FL3
- Locale: Rome, Italy
- Termini: Viterbo Porta Fiorentina; Roma Tiburtina
- Stations: 28
- Colour on map: Blue fern
- Website: trenitalia.com

Service
- Type: Regional rail
- System: Lazio regional railways
- Operator: Trenitalia
- Rolling stock: TAF; ETR Rock
- Daily ridership: 60,000

Technical
- Track length: 88 km (55 mi)
- Number of tracks: 1/2
- Track gauge: 1,435 mm (4 ft 8 1/2 in)
- Electrification: 3,000 V DC
- Operating speed: 63 km/h (39 mph) (ave)
Route map
The Lazio regional railways network.

The FL3 (until 2012 FR3) is a commuter rail route. It forms part of the network of the Lazio regional railways (Italian: ferrovie regionali del Lazio), which is operated by Trenitalia, and converges on the city of Rome, Italy.

The route operates over the infrastructure of the Rome–Capranica–Viterbo railway. Within the territory of the comune of Rome, it plays the role of a commuter railway. It is estimated that on average about 60,000 passengers travel on an FL3 train each day.

The designation FL3 appears only in publicity material (e.g. public transport maps), in the official timetables, and on signs at some stations. The electronic destination boards at stations on the FL3 route show only the designation "R" and the relevant train number.

== Route ==
- Viterbo Porta Fiorentina ↔ Roma Tiburtina

The FL3, a radial route, runs from Viterbo Porta Fiorentina, north west of Rome, in a south easterly direction, via the Rome–Capranica–Viterbo railway, to Roma San Pietro, and then around the southern side of Rome's city centre to Roma Ostiense, and then finishing the ride at Roma Tiburtina.

== Stations ==
The stations on the FL3 are as follows:

- Viterbo Porta Fiorentina
- Viterbo Porta Romana
- Tre Croci
- Vetralla
- Capranica–Sutri
- Oriolo
- Manziana–Canale Monterano
- Bracciano
- Vigna di Valle
- Anguillara
- Cesano di Roma (limit of urban service)
- Olgiata
- La Storta
- La Giustiniana
- Ipogeo degli Ottavi
- Ottavia
- Roma San Filippo Neri
- Roma Monte Mario
- Gemelli
- Roma Balduina
- Appiano
- Valle Aurelia
- Roma San Pietro
- Quattro Venti
- Roma Trastevere
- Roma Ostiense
- Roma Tuscolana
- Roma Tiburtina

== Scheduling ==
The FL3 route is designated in Trenitalia official timetables as M77 Viterbo–Roma FL3.

As of 2012, FL3 services operated between Roma Ostiense and Cesano every 15 minutes. Every second train between Ostiense and Cesano either continues to or originates from Bracciano, and every second train between Ostiense and Bracciano either continues to or originates in Viterbo. In this way, the Cesano–Bracciano section is served by a train every half-hour in each direction, while Bracciano–Viterbo traffic is served by one train per hour in each direction.

The urban section between Roma Ostiense and Cesano di Roma is almost 30 km (19 mi) long, and takes about 50 minutes to traverse. As this section is located within the territory of the comune of Rome ("Roma Capitale"), passengers can travel by purchasing the BIT Metrebus (integrated time ticket), which costs €1.50 for 100 minutes, is valid for one ride on the train, and can also be used on the ATAC public transport network until it expires.

== See also ==
- History of rail transport in Italy
- List of railway stations in Lazio
- Rail transport in Italy
- Transport in Rome
