= Muratella Railway Station =

Railway station serving the city and comune of Rome, Italy

Roma Muratella
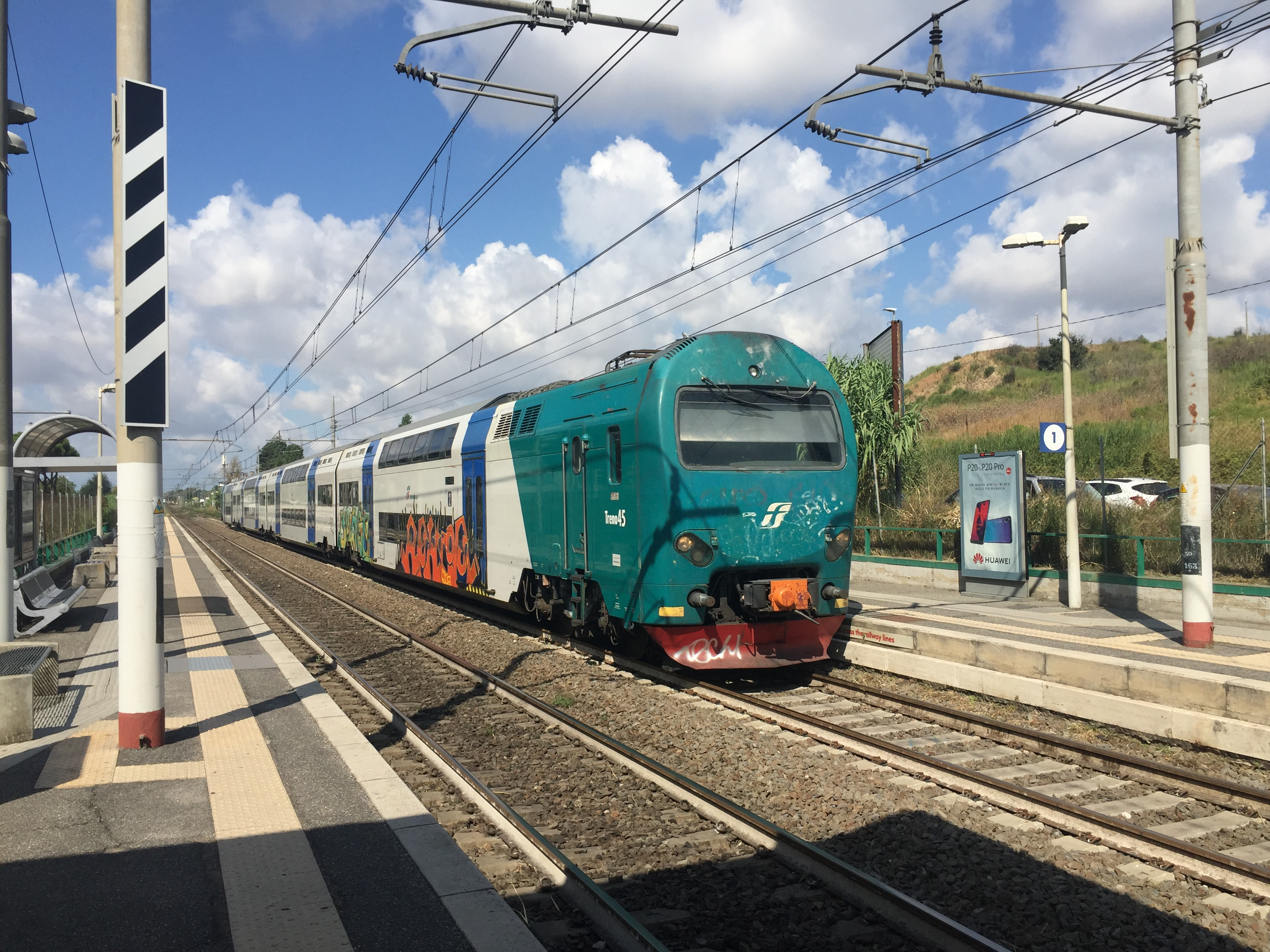
- Muratella Railway Station

General information
- Location: Rome, Rome, Lazio; Italy
- Coordinates: 41°49′29.282″N 12°24′31.32″E,
- Operator: Rete Ferroviaria Italiana; Centostazioni
- Lines: Pisa–Livorno–Roma; Orte-Fiumicino Aeroporto
- Train operators: Trenitalia

History
- Opened: 1 May 1988; 38 years ago
Location
- Click on the map for a fullscreen view

Muratella railway station (Italian: Stazione Muratella) is a railway station serving the city and comune of Rome, Italy. Opened in 1988, it forms part of the Rome–Fiumicino railways. The station serves nearby Parco de medici business park that hosts amongst other organisation the headquarters of the UN World Food Programme. Train services are operated by Trenitalia. This station has two platforms for passenger trains with an accessible barrier-free route to the platform but no elevators.

== See also ==
- History of rail transport in Italy
- List of railway stations in Lazio
- Rail transport in Italy
- Railway stations in Italy

Preceding station	Lazio regional railways	Following station
Magliana towards Orte	FL1	Ponte Galeria towards Fiumicino Aeroporto
