= FL1 (Lazio regional railways) =

Orte–Fiumicino Aeroporto
- FL1
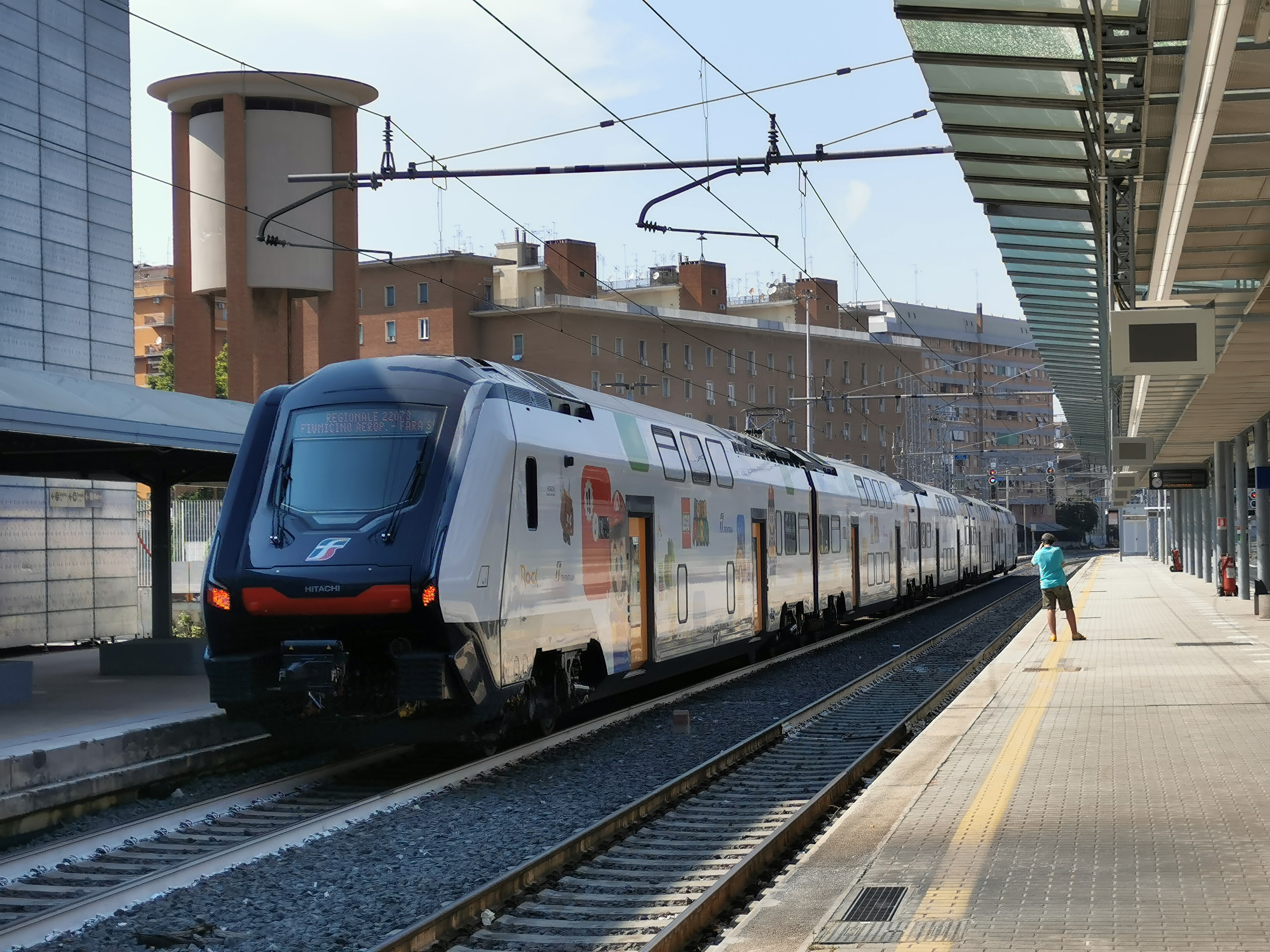
- ETR521 Rock of FL1 departing from Roma Tiburtina

Overview
- Status: Operational
- Locale: Rome, Italy
- Termini: Orte; Fiumicino Aeroporto
- Stations: 26
- Colour on map: Sign green
- Website: trenitalia.com

Service
- Type: Regional rail
- System: Lazio regional railways
- Route number: FL1
- Operator: Trenitalia
- Rolling stock: TAF; ETR Rock
- Daily ridership: 65,000

History
- Opened: 1994

Technical
- Line length: 118 km (73 mi)
- Number of tracks: 2
- Track gauge: 1,435 mm (4 ft 8 1/2 in)
- Electrification: 3,000 V DC
- Operating speed: 48 km/h (30 mph) (average)
Route map
The Lazio regional railways network.

The FL1 (until 2012 FR1) is a regional rail route forming part of the Lazio regional railways network (Italian: ferrovie regionali del Lazio), which is operated by Trenitalia, and converges on the city of Rome, Italy.

The route operates over the infrastructure of the Florence–Rome railway, the Pisa–Livorno–Rome railway and the Rome–Fiumicino railway. Within the territory of the comune of Rome, it plays the role of a commuter railway. It is estimated that on average about 65,000 passengers travel on an FL1 train each day.

The electronic destination boards at stations show only the designation "R" (Regional train).

== Route ==
- Orte ↔ Fiumicino Aeroporto

The FL1, a cross-city route, runs from Orte, in the province of Viterbo, in a southerly direction over the Florence–Rome railway as far as Roma Tiburtina. It then continues, via the Pisa–Livorno–Rome railway east and south of Rome's city centre, to Roma Trastevere. Finally, it takes the Rome–Fiumicino railway to Fiumicino Aeroporto, in the comune of Fiumicino southwest of the city centre.

== History ==
The first FL1 services between Monterotondo-Mentana and Fiumicino Aeroporto went into operation during 1994, bringing about an increased frequency of services on the lines through Rome.

The route also included hourly trains between Orte and Monterotondo-Mentana.

Until 2000, the FL1 route divided into two sections near Fiumicino: one train in every four branched off to Fiumicino Città, while the remaining services headed towards Fiumicino Aeroporto.

Upon the introduction of the new timetable in 2000, the Fiumicino Città station was officially closed.

On 7 December 2006, the new Fiera di Roma railway station was opened to the public, and included in the FL1 route.

== Stations ==
The stations on the FL1 are as follows:

- Orte
- Gallese in Teverina
- Civita Castellana-Magliano
- Collevecchio-Poggio Sommavilla
- Stimigliano
- Gavignano Sabino
- Poggio Mirteto
- Fara Sabina-Montelibretti
- Piana Bella di Montelibretti
- Monterotondo-Mentana
- Settebagni (limit of urban service)
- Fidene
- Nuovo Salario
- Roma Nomentana
- Roma Tiburtina
- Roma Tuscolana
- Roma Ostiense
- Roma Trastevere
- Villa Bonelli
- Magliana
- Muratella
- Ponte Galeria
- Fiera di Roma (limit of urban service)
- Parco Leonardo
- Fiumicino Aeroporto LE

== Scheduling ==
The FL1 route is designated in Trenitalia official timetables as M70 Orte–Fara Sabina–Fiumicino FR1.

As of 2012, FL1 services operated between Fara Sabina and Fiumicino every 15 minutes. As some FL1 services originated or terminated in Fara Sabina or Poggio Mirteto, the FL1 trains ran between Fara Sabina and Poggio Mirteto every 30 minutes, and linked Poggio Mirteto and Orte every 60 minutes.

== See also ==
- History of rail transport in Italy
- List of railway stations in Lazio
- Rail transport in Italy
- Transport in Rome
