= Rome Fiumicino Airport =

Main airport serving Rome, Italy

Rome Fiumicino Leonardo da Vinci International Airport Aeroporto internazionale di Roma-Fiumicino "Leonardo da Vinci"

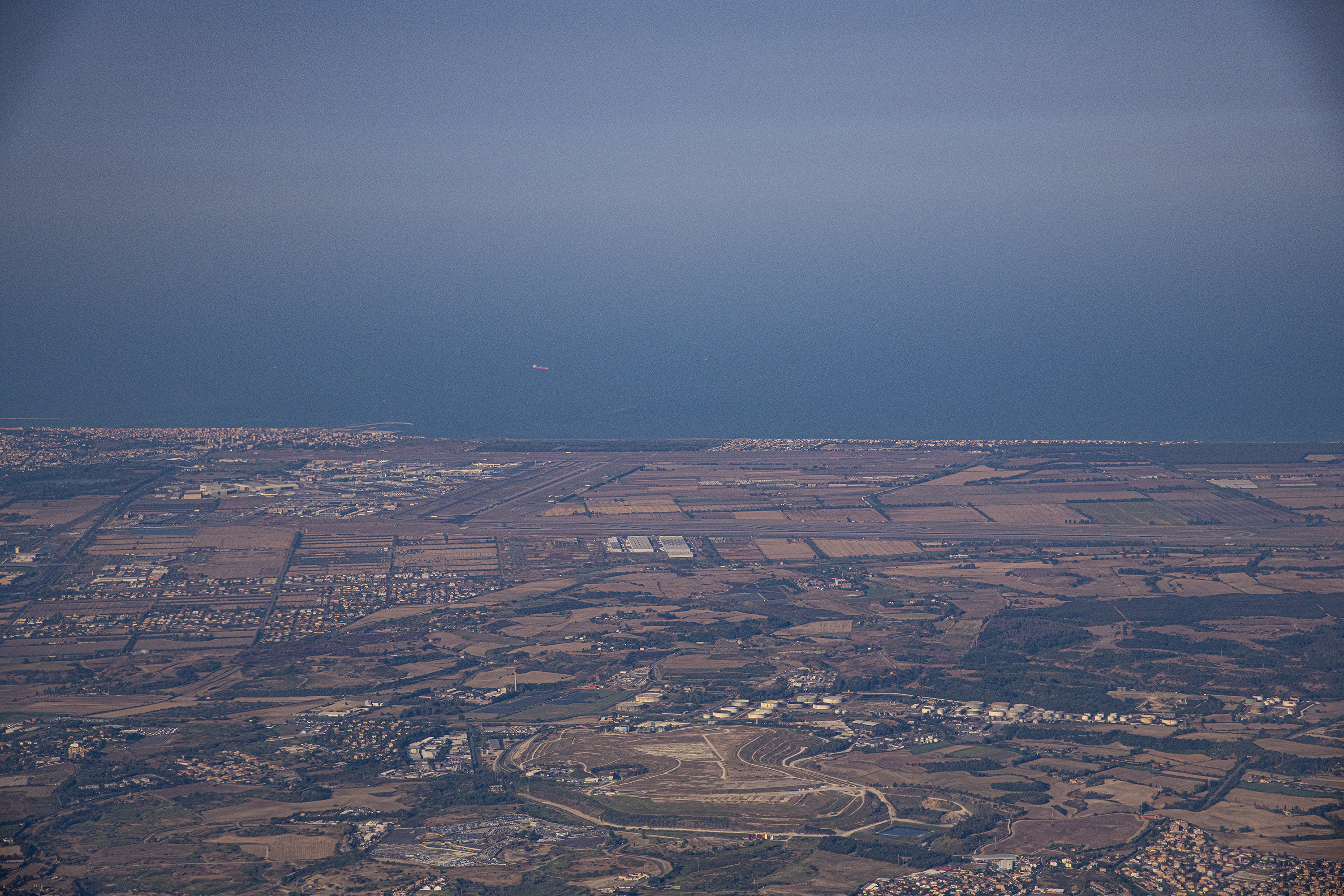
- View of the airport from the east in 2026.
- IATA: FCO; ICAO: LIRF; WMO: 16242

Summary
- Airport type: Public
- Owner: Ministry of Infrastructure and Transport
- Operator: Aeroporti di Roma
- Serves: Fiumicino; Rome; Lazio region Vatican City
- Location: Fiumicino, Metropolitan City of Rome Capital, Lazio, Italy
- Opened: 15 January 1961; 65 years ago
- Hub for: ITA Airways; Poste Air Cargo
- Operating base for: Aeroitalia; easyJet; MSC Air Cargo; Neos; Ryanair; Vueling; Wizz Air
- Time zone: CET (UTC+01:00)
  - Summer (DST): CEST (UTC+02:00)
- Elevation AMSL: 15 ft (4.6 m)
- Coordinates: 41°48′01″N 012°14′20″E
- Website: www.adr.it/web/aeroporti-di-roma-en/

Maps
- Airport map

- Location of airport in Italy FCO/LIRF (Italy)

Runways
Direction	Length		Surface
Direction	m	ft	Surface
07/25	3,190	10,466	Asphalt
16R/34L	3,902	12,802	Asphalt
16L/34R	3,902	12,802	Asphalt

Statistics (2024)
- Passengers: 49,203,734
- Passenger change 23-24: ▲38.1%
- Aircraft movement: 315,597
- Movements change 23-24: ▲18.4%
- Cargo (tons): 271,579.6
- Cargo change 23-24: ▲43%

Rome Fiumicino Leonardo da Vinci International Airport (Italian: Aeroporto internazionale di Roma-Fiumicino "Leonardo da Vinci") (IATA: FCO, ICAO: LIRF) is an international airport in Fiumicino, Italy, serving Rome, its metropolitan area, Vatican City and the wider Lazio region. It is the busiest airport in the country, the eighth-busiest airport in Europe and the world's 40th-busiest airport with over 50 million passengers served in 2025. It covers an area of 16 km^{2} (6.2 sq mi).

Fiumicino serves as the main hub for ITA Airways, the Italian flag carrier and the largest airline in the country, and Poste Air Cargo. It was previously the hub for Alitalia, the defunct airline that was Italy's largest and main flag carrier. It is also an operating base for several other airlines, such as Aeroitalia, easyJet, Neos, Ryanair, Vueling and Wizz Air. The airport is managed by Aeroporti di Roma (ADR), part of the Italian transport holding company Mundys.

Opened in 1961, it is in Fiumicino, 30 km (19 mi) south of Rome, and is named for Italian polymath Leonardo da Vinci (1452–1519). Reproductions of his most famous works and inventions are displayed at the airport.

== History ==
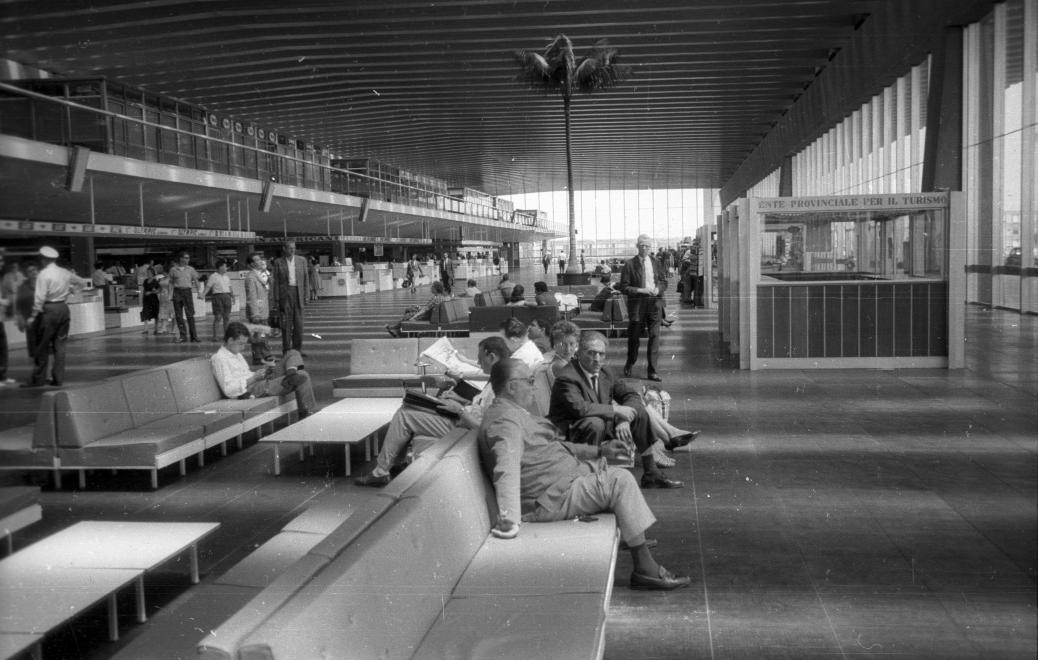
Check-in hall at Fiumicino in 1964

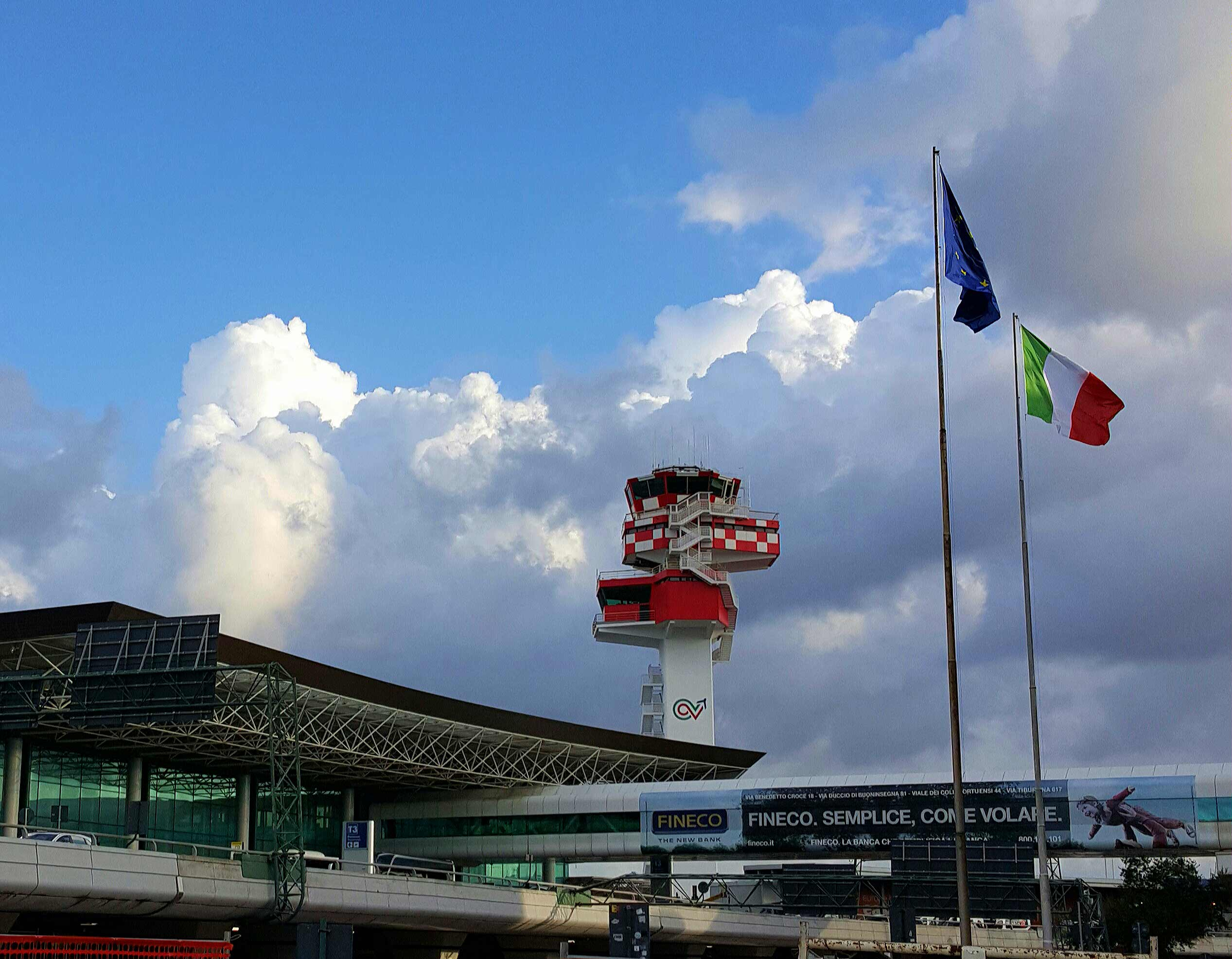
Air traffic control tower

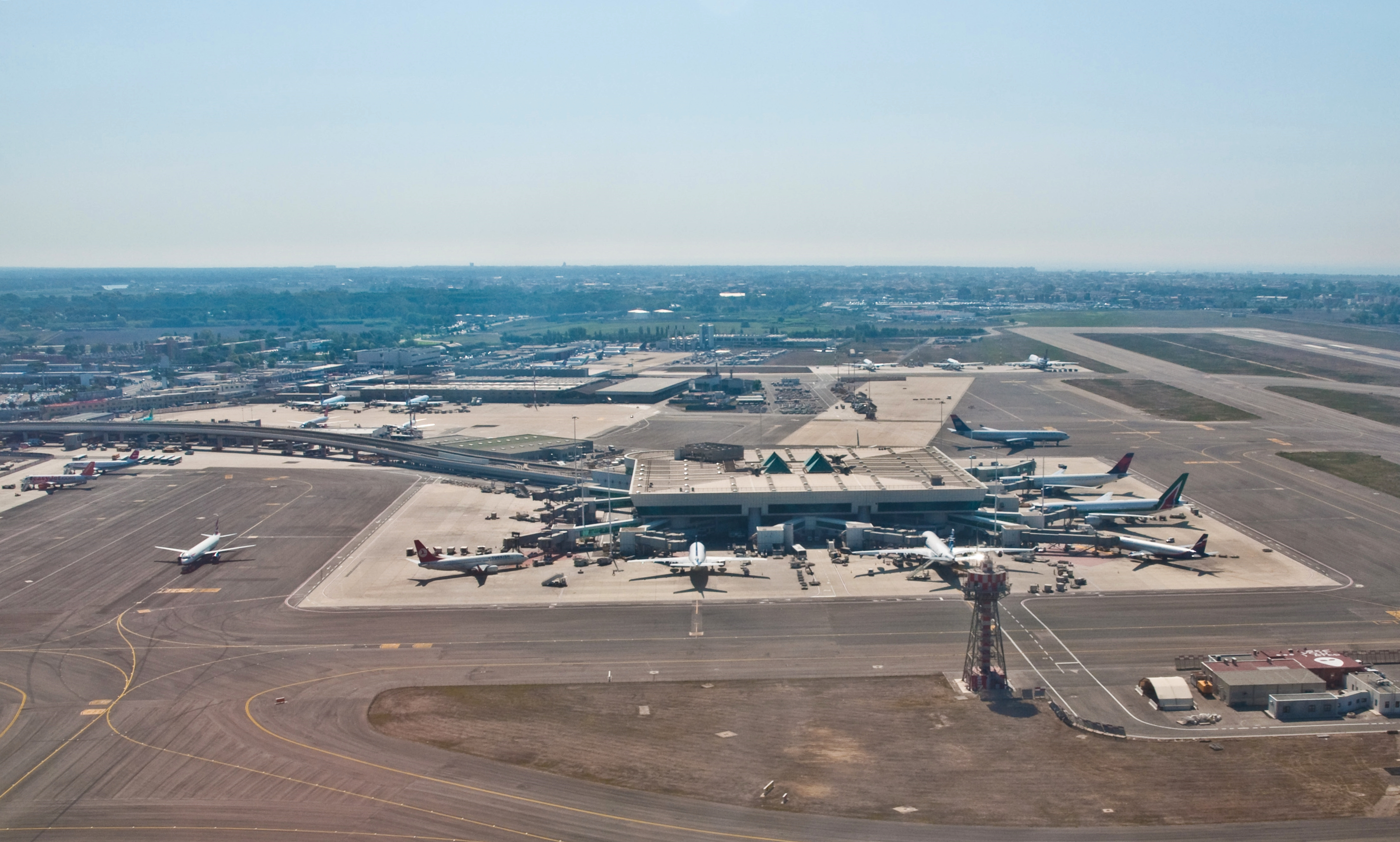
Aerial view of the Satellite Ovest, Terminal 3

=== Early years ===
During construction, the remains of some Roman ships were found.

The airport was officially opened on 15 January 1961, with two runways, replacing the smaller Rome Ciampino Airport, which remains in service for some low-cost airlines as well as domestic and charter operations. Despite being officially opened in 1961, Leonardo da Vinci–Fiumicino Airport had actually been in use since 20 August 1960. This was to help relieve air traffic that was congesting Rome Ciampino Airport during the 1960 Summer Olympics.

During the 1960s, former home-based Alitalia invested heavily in the new airport, building hangars and maintenance centres; in the same period a third runway was added (16L/34R).

=== Terrorist attacks ===
Rome-Fiumicino airport has been hit twice by terrorist attacks. The first attack was in 1973 (34 deaths) following the expulsion of the Palestine Liberation Organization (PLO) from Jordan and the Jordanian–Palestinian civil war. The second attack occurred in 1985 (19 deaths +4 terrorists in the departure area of Terminal B, now Terminal 3) part of the Israeli–Palestinian conflict, presumably linked to Abu Nidal Organization.

=== Later development ===
Since 2005, the airport operates a category III B instrument landing system (ILS). Further improvement work was implemented in 2007 to enable the airport to handle 30 takeoffs/landings per hour, up from 10, in the event of thick fog. Three runways presently operate at Leonardo da Vinci airport: 16L/34R and 16R/34L (separated by a distance of 4,000 m (13,000 ft)), and 07/25, used only westwards for takeoffs owing to the prevailing winds. The airport used to have a fourth runway, 16C/34C which was located alongside 16L/34R, it was mostly used as a taxiway or as a backup for 16L/34R; the runway is now designated as Taxiway "D".

In 2010, the new single baggage handling system for more efficient luggage delivery began operations.

== Terminals ==
=== Overview ===
As of 2021, after major expansion and refurbishment works, the airport now features two terminals:

- Terminal 1 (Gates A1-A10, A21-A29, A31-A52, A61–A83) home base to ITA Airways
- Terminal 3 (Gates E1-E8, E11-E24, E31-E44, E51–E61) is the largest terminal. It also incorporates the former Terminal 5 as well as the satellite building for non-Schengen departures. A new central airside hall has been built as its middle part in recent years.

=== Development ===
The terminals were upgraded during the 1990s and 2000s.

In January 2017, Terminal 5 was closed for renovations; a new central airside hall is currently being built in the middle section. The former Terminal 2 closed permanently on 15 December 2017 to make way for the north-west expansion of Terminal 1. A new three-storey boarding and waiting area, as well as a new Pier A with 13 boarding and 10 remote gates, have been built.

From 17 March 2020 to 6 August 2021, Terminal 1 was closed due to decreased passenger traffic amidst the COVID-19 pandemic; this pause was used to perform a redesign of the main hall layout, which increased the available passenger space.

Future plans include a new Terminal 4, expansion of runways, and new buildings for car parking, services, and airport facilities.

=== SkyBridge ===
An automated people mover (APM) called SkyBridge (Innovia APM 100) opened in 1999 along with the Satellite C. It consists of two stations, one on the third floor of Terminal 3, and the other on the second floor of gate area E31–44. This shuttle train is the only means of transport for passengers between the two sections of the terminal. The westbound service, from T3 to Gates E31–44, is for departing passengers only, while the eastbound service is for arriving passengers only. Arriving passengers are not permitted to take the train back, as they need to pass through a transfer security checkpoint to re-enter the departure area. Departing passengers are permitted to take the train back to Terminal 3. However, as departing passengers mix with arriving passengers, all passengers must exit the train in the main terminal building T3 and departing passengers have to clear security again.

== Airlines and destinations ==
The following airlines operate regular scheduled, seasonal and charter flights to and from Fiumicino:

Airlines	Destinations	Refs
Aegean Airlines	Athens, Larnaca, Thessaloniki; Seasonal: Heraklion	
Aer Lingus	Dublin	
Aeroitalia	Alghero, Cagliari, Catania, Comiso, Genoa, Olbia, Palermo, Tripoli-Mitiga; Seasonal: Ibiza	
Aerolíneas Argentinas	Buenos Aires–Ezeiza	
Aeroméxico	Mexico City–Benito Juárez	
Air Algérie	Algiers	
Air Arabia	Sharjah	
Air Cairo	Cairo, Sharm El Sheikh; Seasonal: Hurghada (begins 25 December 2026), Luxor	
Air Canada	Montréal–Trudeau, Toronto–Pearson	
Air China	Beijing–Capital	
Air Corsica	Seasonal: Ajaccio, Bastia	
Air Europa	Madrid	
Air France	Paris–Charles de Gaulle	
Air India	Delhi	
Air Montenegro	Podgorica	
Air Serbia	Belgrade	
Air Seychelles	Seasonal: Hurghada, Seychelles	
Air Transat	Seasonal: Montréal–Trudeau, Toronto–Pearson	
airBaltic	Riga	
AJet	Istanbul–Sabiha Gökçen	
Alaska Airlines	Seasonal: Seattle/Tacoma	
AlbaStar	Tarbes-Lourdes	
American Airlines	Dallas/Fort Worth, Philadelphia; Seasonal: Charlotte, Chicago–O'Hare, Miami, New York–JFK	
Arkia	Tel Aviv	
Asiana Airlines	Seoul–Incheon	
Austrian Airlines	Vienna	
Biman Bangladesh Airlines	Dhaka	
Bluebird Airways	Tel Aviv	
British Airways	London–Heathrow	
Brussels Airlines	Brussels	
Bulgaria Air	Sofia	
Cathay Pacific	Seasonal: Hong Kong	
China Airlines	Taipei–Taoyuan	
China Eastern Airlines	Shanghai–Pudong, Wenzhou	
Condor	Frankfurt	
Croatia Airlines	Dubrovnik, Split, Zagreb	
Dan Air	Bacău	
DAT	Ancona	
Delta Air Lines	Atlanta, Boston, Detroit, Minneapolis/St. Paul, New York–JFK; Seasonal: Seattle/Tacoma	
easyJet	Basel/Mulhouse, Belfast–International, Berlin, Birmingham, Bordeaux, Bristol, Brussels, Frankfurt, Geneva, Glasgow, Hamburg, London–Gatwick, Lyon, Manchester, Munich, Nantes, Newcastle upon Tyne, Nice, Paris–Orly, Strasbourg, Zurich	
EgyptAir	Cairo	
El Al	Tel Aviv	
Emirates	Dubai–International	
Ethiopian Airlines	Addis Ababa	
Etihad Airways	Abu Dhabi	
Eurowings	Berlin, Cologne/Bonn, Düsseldorf, Hamburg, Prague, Stuttgart; Seasonal: Hannover, Nuremberg	
Finnair	Helsinki	
Flynas	Seasonal: Riyadh	
FlyOne	Chișinău, Yerevan	
Georgian Airways	Tbilisi	
Gulf Air	Bahrain	
HiSky	Chișinău	
Iberia	Madrid	
Icelandair	Reykjavík–Keflavík	
Israir	Tel Aviv	
ITA Airways	Accra, Algiers, Amsterdam, Athens, Bangkok–Suvarnabhumi, Barcelona, Bari, Bologna, Boston, Brindisi, Brussels, Buenos Aires–Ezeiza, Cairo, Caracas (begins 30 March 2027), Catania, Dakar–Diass, Delhi, Dubai–International, Florence, Frankfurt, Geneva, Genoa, Houston–Intercontinental, Lamezia Terme, London–Heathrow, Los Angeles, Madrid, Miami, Milan–Linate, Munich, Naples, New York–JFK, Nice, Palermo, Paris–Charles de Gaulle, Reggio Calabria, Rio de Janeiro–Galeão, Riyadh, San Francisco, São Paulo–Guarulhos, Tel Aviv, Tokyo–Haneda, Trieste, Tripoli–Mitiga, Tunis, Turin, Venice, Verona (resumes 28 March 2027), Washington–Dulles, Zurich; Seasonal: Alicante, Chicago–O'Hare, Corfu, Ibiza, Málaga, Malé, Malta, Marseille, Mauritius, Mykonos, Palma de Mallorca, Pantelleria, Rhodes, Santo Domingo–Las Américas (begins 30 November 2026), Tirana, Toronto–Pearson, Trapani, Valencia, Zakynthos; Seasonal charter: Fort-de-France	
Jet2.com	Birmingham, Edinburgh, Glasgow, London–Stansted, Manchester	
KLM	Amsterdam	
KM Malta Airlines	Malta	
Korean Air	Seoul–Incheon	
Kuwait Airways	Kuwait City	
LATAM Brasil	São Paulo–Guarulhos	
LOT Polish Airlines	Kraków, Warsaw–Chopin	
Lufthansa	Frankfurt, Munich	
Lufthansa City Airlines	Munich	
Luxair	Luxembourg	
MedSky Airways	Benghazi, Tripoli–Mitiga	
Neos	Boa Vista, Catania, Dakar–Diass, Havana, Holguín, Malé, Marsa Alam, Milan Malpensa, Mombasa, Sal, Sharm El Sheikh, Valencia; Seasonal: Cancún, Fuerteventura, Heraklion, Ibiza, Karpathos, Marsa Matruh, Mauritius, Mykonos, Nosy Be, Rhodes, Salalah, Zanzibar	
Nile Air	Seasonal charter: Cairo, Luxor	
Norwegian Air Shuttle	Copenhagen, Oslo, Stockholm–Arlanda; Seasonal: Bergen, Billund	
Oman Air	Muscat	
Pegasus Airlines	Istanbul–Sabiha Gökçen	
Qantas	Seasonal: Perth, Sydney	
Qatar Airways	Doha	
Royal Air Maroc	Casablanca	
Royal Jordanian	Amman–Queen Alia	
Ryanair	Alicante, Athens, Barcelona, Bari, Berlin, Brindisi, Brussels, Brussels Charleroi, Catania, Copenhagen, Dublin, Eindhoven, Faro, Frankfurt Hahn, Gdańsk, Gothenburg, Gran Canaria, Katowice, Lisbon, Madrid, Málaga, Malta, Marseille, Memmingen, Palermo, Paphos, Paris Beauvais, Porto, Riga, Seville, Stockholm–Arlanda, Tenerife–South, Thessaloniki, Toulouse, Trapani, Valencia, Vienna, Zagreb; Seasonal: Birmingham, Burgas, Chania, Corfu, Dubrovnik, Ibiza, Kefalonia, Kos, Menorca, Palma de Mallorca, Preveza, Rhodes, Santorini, Skiathos, Split, Zadar, Zakynthos	
Saudia	Jeddah, Riyadh	
Scandinavian Airlines	Copenhagen; Seasonal: Oslo	
Sichuan Airlines	Chengdu–Tianfu	
Singapore Airlines	Singapore	
Sky Alps	Crotone, Klagenfurt, Verona; Seasonal: Mostar, Salzburg	
Sky Express	Athens	
Smartwings	Prague	
SunExpress	Seasonal: İzmir	
Swiss International Air Lines	Zurich	
Transavia	Rotterdam/The Hague	
Trinity Airways	Seoul–Incheon	
Tunisair	Tunis	
Turkish Airlines	Istanbul	
TUS Airways	Tel Aviv	
United Airlines	Chicago-O'Hare, Newark, Washington Dulles; Seasonal: Denver, San Francisco	
Uzbekistan Airways	Tashkent, Urgench	
Volotea	Asturias, Bordeaux, Nantes, Strasbourg; Seasonal: Bilbao, Brest, Limoges, Lourdes	
Vueling	Barcelona, Bilbao, Málaga, Valencia	
WestJet	Seasonal: Calgary	
Wizz Air	Alexandria, Alicante, Bacău, Baku, Barcelona, Belgrade, Bilbao, Bordeaux, Brașov, Bratislava, Bucharest–Otopeni, Budapest, Catania (begins 14 December 2026), Chișinău, Cluj-Napoca, Constanța, Craiova, Gdańsk, Giza, Hurghada, Iași, Jeddah, Košice, Kraków, Kutaisi, Lamezia Terme, Lampedusa, Larnaca, Lisbon, London–Luton, Madrid, Málaga, Malta, Marrakesh, Marsa Alam, Nice, Paris–Orly, Oradea, Oslo, Palermo, Podgorica, Porto, Poznań, Prague, Pristina, Rzeszów, Santiago de Compostela (begins 14 December 2026), Sarajevo, Seville, Sharm El Sheikh, Sibiu, Skopje, Sofia, Suceava, Tallinn, Târgu Mureș, Tel Aviv, Tenerife–South, Timișoara, Tirana, Turin, Valencia, Varna, Warsaw–Chopin, Yerevan, Zaragoza; Seasonal: Chania, Corfu, Kefalonia, Lampedusa, Menorca, Mykonos, Rhodes, Santorini, Skiathos, Zakynthos	

Rome Fiumicino Airport passenger destinations map (16 July 2026)

== Statistics ==
=== Busiest domestic routes ===
Busiest domestic routes from/to Rome–Fiumicino (2023)
Rank	Rank (v. 2022)	Airport	Passengers	Airline(s)
1	Steady	Catania, Sicily	▲1,559,129	Aeroitalia, ITA Airways, Ryanair
2	Steady	Palermo, Sicily	▲1,392,419	Aeroitalia, ITA Airways, Ryanair
3	▲1	Milan-Linate, Lombardy	▲870,619	ITA Airways
4	▼1	Cagliari, Sardinia	▲720,227	ITA Airways
5	Steady	Bari, Apulia	▲624,548	ITA Airways, Ryanair
6	Steady	Brindisi, Apulia	▲448,344	ITA Airways, Ryanair
7	Steady	Olbia, Sardinia	▲396,178	Aeroitalia, Volotea
8	▲3	Turin, Piedmont	▲331,136	ITA Airways
9	▲3	Venice, Veneto	▲322,263	ITA Airways
10	Steady	Genoa, Liguria	▲298,846	ITA Airways

=== Busiest European routes ===
Busiest European routes from/to Rome–Fiumicino (2025)
Rank	Rank (v. 2022)	Airport	Passengers	Airline(s)
1	Steady	Madrid, Spain	▲1,751,366	Air Europa, Iberia, ITA Airways, Wizz Air
2	Steady	Barcelona, Spain	▲1,484,641	ITA Airways, Ryanair, Vueling, Wizz Air
3	▲2	Paris–Orly, France	▲1,092,396	easyJet, Transavia, Vueling, Wizz Air
4	▼1	Paris–Charles de Gaulle, France	▲929,334	ITA Airways, Air France
5	▲3	London-Gatwick, United Kingdom	▲797,330	easyJet, Vueling, Wizz Air
6	Steady	Athens, Greece	▲746,210	Aegean Airlines, ITA Airways, Ryanair, Sky Express
7	Steady	London–Heathrow, United Kingdom	▲722,036	ITA Airways, British Airways
8	▼4	Amsterdam, Netherlands	▼732,897	ITA Airways, KLM
9	Steady	Brussels, Belgium	▲606,155	Brussels Airlines, ITA Airways, Ryanair
10	▲1	Frankfurt, Germany	▲569,076	ITA Airways, Lufthansa
11	▼1	Munich, Germany	▲568,457	ITA Airways, Lufthansa
12	Steady	Vienna, Austria	▲553,646	Austrian Airlines, Ryanair, Wizz Air
13	Steady	Istanbul, Turkey	▲476,857	Turkish Airlines
14	Steady	Lisbon, Portugal	▲441,989	Ryanair, TAP Air Portugal
15	▲1	Zürich, Switzerland	▲449,450	ITA Airways, Swiss International Air Lines
16	▲6	Dublin, Ireland	▲432,117	Aer Lingus, Ryanair
17	▲1	Nice, France	▲390,372	ITA Airways, easyJet, Wizz Air
18	▲3	Prague, Czech Republic	▲388,174	Eurowings, Smartwings, Wizz Air
19	▲6	Valencia, Spain	▲376,570	Ryanair, Vueling, Wizz Air
20	▼1	Tirana, Albania	▲349,489	ITA Airways, Air Albania, Wizz Air

=== Busiest intercontinental routes ===
Busiest intercontinental routes from/to Rome–Fiumicino (2025)
Rank	Rank (v. 2023)	Airport	Passengers	Airline(s)
1	Steady	New York–JFK, United States	▼1,090,714	ITA Airways, American Airlines, Delta Air Lines, Norse Atlantic Airways
2	▲1	Dubai–International, United Arab Emirates	▲691,006	ITA Airways, Emirates
3	▼1	Tel Aviv, Israel	▲641,207	ITA Airways, El Al, Vueling, Ryanair
4	▲4	São Paulo–Guarulhos, Brazil	▲581,522	ITA Airways, LATAM Brasil
5	▼1	Doha, Qatar	▼481,427	Qatar Airways
6	▲3	Istanbul–Sabiha Gökçen, Turkey	▲445,824	Pegasus Airlines, Turkish Airlines
7	▲1	Toronto–Pearson, Canada	▼437,067	ITA Airways, Air Canada, Air Transat
8	▼1	Buenos Aires–Ezeiza, Argentina	▲380,998	ITA Airways, Aerolíneas Argentinas
9	▼4	Abu Dhabi, United Arab Emirates	▼375,562	Etihad Airways
10	▲2	Seoul–Incheon, South Korea	▲343,635	Asiana Airlines, Korean Air
11	▼1	Atlanta, United States	▲343,347	Delta Air Lines
12	▲2	Cairo, Egypt	▲315,668	ITA Airways, EgyptAir
13	▲2	Chicago–O'Hare, United States	▼298,420	American Airlines, United Airlines
14	▼1	Montréal–Trudeau, Canada	▼297,121	Air Canada, Air Transat
15	▼4	Newark, United States	▲291,114	United Airlines
16	▲2	Washington–Dulles, United States	▼264,838	ITA Airways, United Airlines
17	▲1	Miami, United States	▲262,100	ITA Airways
18	▲2	Addis Ababa, Ethiopia	▲242,792	Ethiopian Airlines
19	▲	Sharm El Sheikh, Egypt	▲235,046	Air Cairo, Neos, Wizz Air
20	▼4	Boston, United States	▲216,286	ITA Airways, Delta Air Lines

== Ground transport ==
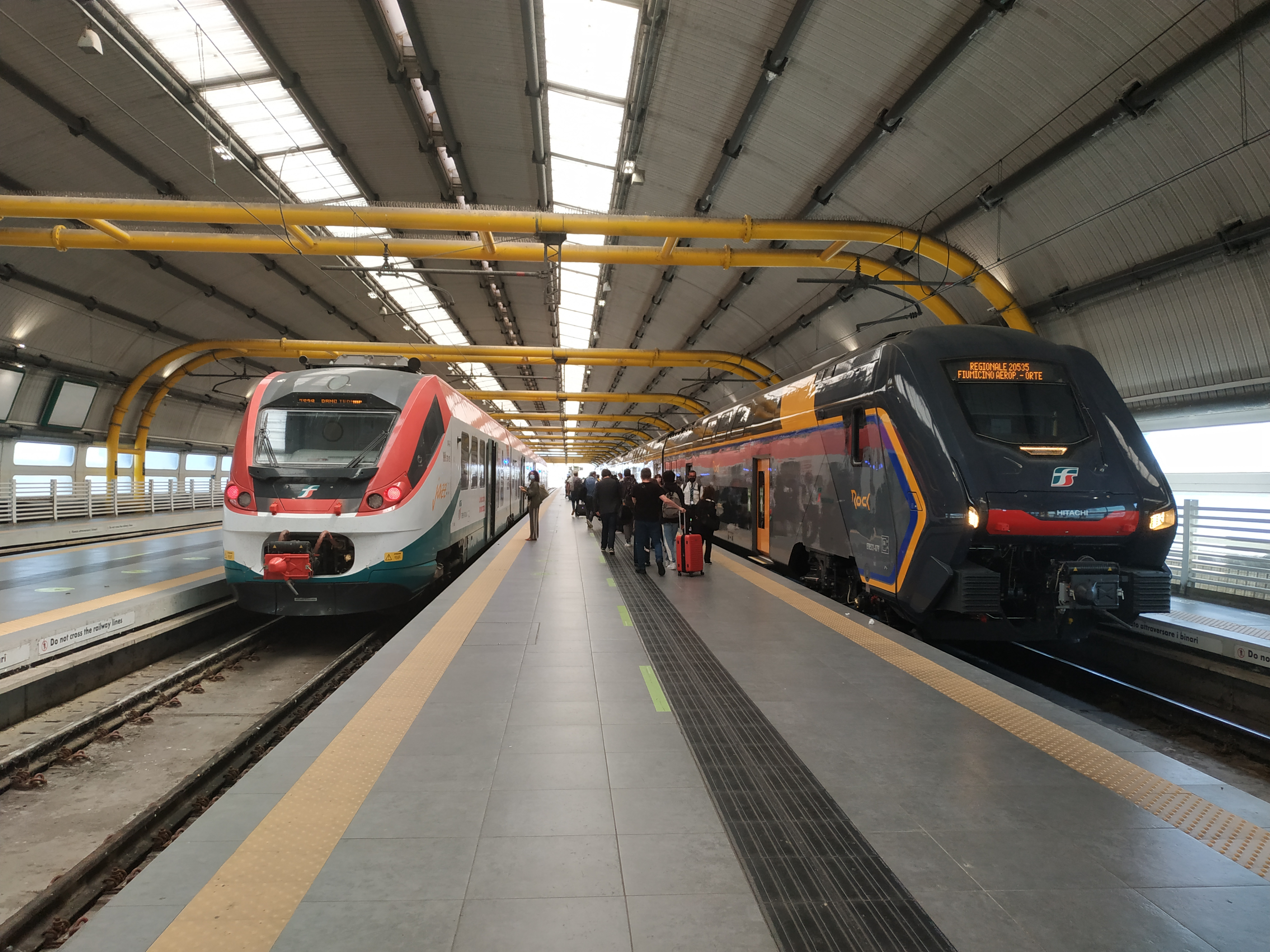
Fiumicino Aeroporto railway station. On the left is the Leonardo Express and on the right is the FL1 line of the Lazio regional railways.

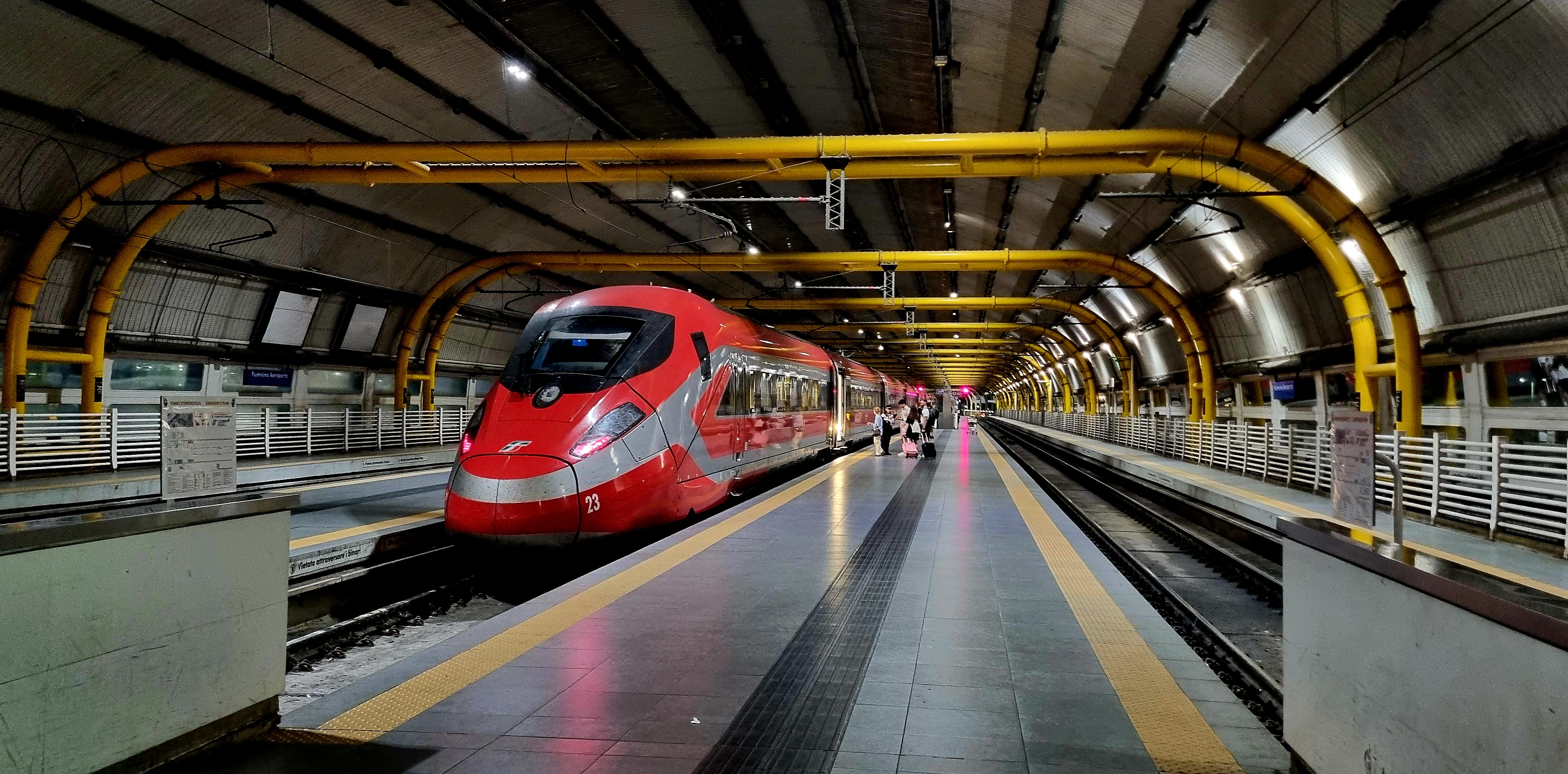
The high-speed train Frecciarossa 1000 at the station

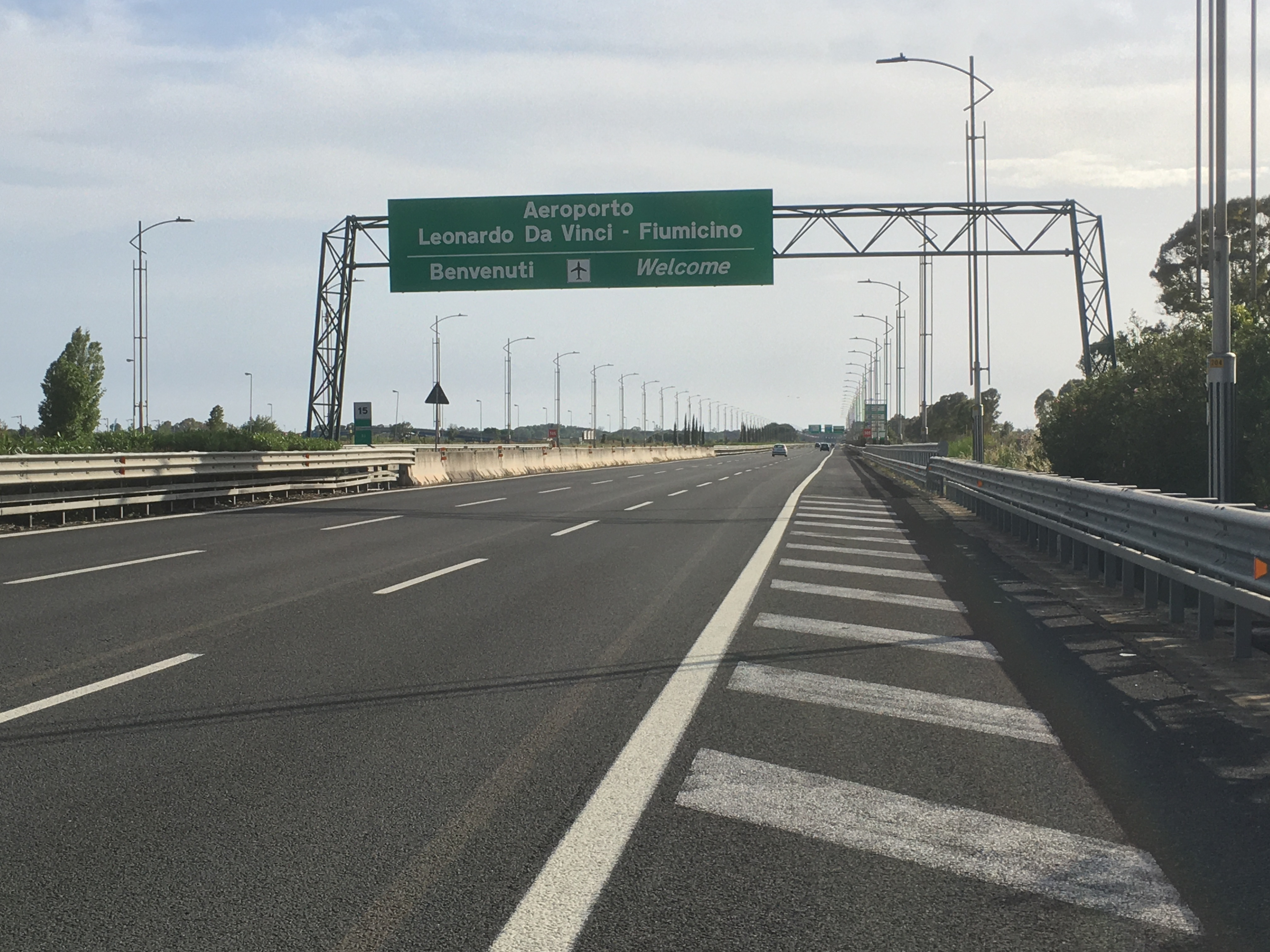
Leonardo da Vinci Airport welcome signboard from the A91 highway

=== Leonardo Express ===
Fiumicino Aeroporto railway station is served by the Leonardo Express train operated by Trenitalia, available at the airport terminal. It takes 30 minutes to get to Termini Station in the city center of Rome, with a non-stop trip that is provided every 15 minutes. The railway section to the airport was opened in May 1990, and uses the Rome-Fiumicino railway infrastructure.

=== FL lines ===
Leonardo da Vinci airport is also connected to Rome by the FL1 line, a suburban commuter and rapid transit line. The FL1 line does not provide a direct connection to Termini station, but connects the city by stopping at all stations between the airport and the northern outskirts of the city, with trains running every 15 minutes. It stops at most of Rome's main stations where it is possible to change to the metro, tram, and bus network: Trastevere (Tram lines 3 and 8), Ostiense (Metro Piramide), Tuscolana (Metro Ponte Lungo) or Roma Tiburtina (Metro Tiburtina).

=== High-speed ===
The airport is also connected to the Italian high-speed network, the following connections depart from Fiumicino Aeroporto station:

- Frecciarossa (from 9 December 2018): which connects it to Venice via the national high-speed network with intermediate stops in Roma Termini, Roma Tiburtina, Firenze Santa Maria Novella, Bologna and Padua (frequency two pairs of trains per day).
- Frecciarossa (from 12 July 2022): which connects to Naples via the national high-speed network with intermediate stops in Napoli Afragola and Roma Termini.

=== Road ===
Leonardo da Vinci is about 35 km (22 mi) by car from Rome's historic city centre. The airport is also served by different categories of transport: buses, shuttle buses, car sharing and taxis.

The airport is a terminus for local and national bus lines:

- Night connection COTRAL Fiumicino Airport - Roma Termini - Roma Tiburtina station
- Connection COTRAL Cornelia Metro line A - Fregene - Fiumicino Airport
- Connection COTRAL Lido di Ostia Centro - Isola Sacra - Fiumicino Airport
- Connection COTRAL EUR Magliana Metro line B - Fiumicino City - Fiumicino Airport
- Connection COTRAL Latina - Fiumicino Airport
- TERRAVISION SHUTTLE connection Roma Termini - Fiumicino Airport
- Schiaffini Bus Connection Roma Termini - Fiumicino Airport
- SIT BUS SHUTTLE connection Roma Termini - Piazza Cavour - Fiumicino Airport
- Tam Bus connection Roma Ostiense - Fiumicino Airport
- AIRPORT CONNECTION connection Fiumicino Airport - Rome Bus Rental

Added to these are the national connections operated by the companies Flixbus and Itabus.

It can be reached from the highways:

- Rome - Fiumicino Airport;
- Rome - Civitavecchia - Tarquinia.

And also from the following streets:

- state road which connects Ostia to Fiumicino;
- SP1 Via Portuense provincial road which connects Fiumicino with Rome.

Rome Fiumicino airport is equipped with:

- Multi-storey car parks P-Terminal (A-B-C-D)
- Long-term parking
- Executive parking
- Parking for motorcycles (available on the ground floor of the Multi-storey P-Terminal A).

Leonardo da Vinci has improved the real-time info mobility service that is provided to passengers and airport operators on the leading connections from the airport. This new layout makes it easier for passengers to interpret information on connections to and from the airport. They have also upgraded road surfaces in the arrival areas of Terminal 1 and Terminal 3 to let taxis pull up to the platform more easily and make it easier for passengers to get off.

== Incidents and accidents ==
From the 1960s until the 1980s, the airport experienced significant aircraft hijackings as well as being the scene of two major terrorist attacks and the port of origin for an aircraft bombing in flight—some engendered by Palestinians as part of the Israeli–Palestinian conflict.

- On 17 December 1973, during the 1973 Rome airport attacks and hijacking, a Boeing 707-321B operating as Pan American World Airways (Pan Am) Flight 110 was attacked by Palestinian assailants. 30 passengers were killed when phosphorus bombs were thrown aboard the aircraft as it was preparing for departure. During the same incident a Lufthansa Boeing 737 (D-ABEY) was hijacked and landed at Athens, Damascus and finally in Kuwait. All remaining passengers and crew were then released. Two people died in the incident.
- On 19 November 1977, an Ethiopian Airlines Boeing 707-360C, a cargo flight, crashed after takeoff 0.5 km (0.3 mi) W of FCO. The plane barely gained height after takeoff from runway 25, reaching a height of 7–8 m (23–26 ft), contacting treetops, and struck the ground 280 m (920 ft) further on. All five occupants (three crew, two passengers) were killed. Unconfirmed reports indicated the plane was overloaded.
- On 2 February 2013, Alitalia Flight 1670, operated by a leased ATR 72, en route from Pisa International Airport to Rome, overran the runway during landing. 16 occupants were injured, two of them seriously. The aircraft was subsequently written off.
