= Roma Ostiense railway station =

Railway station in Rome, Italy

Roma Ostiense
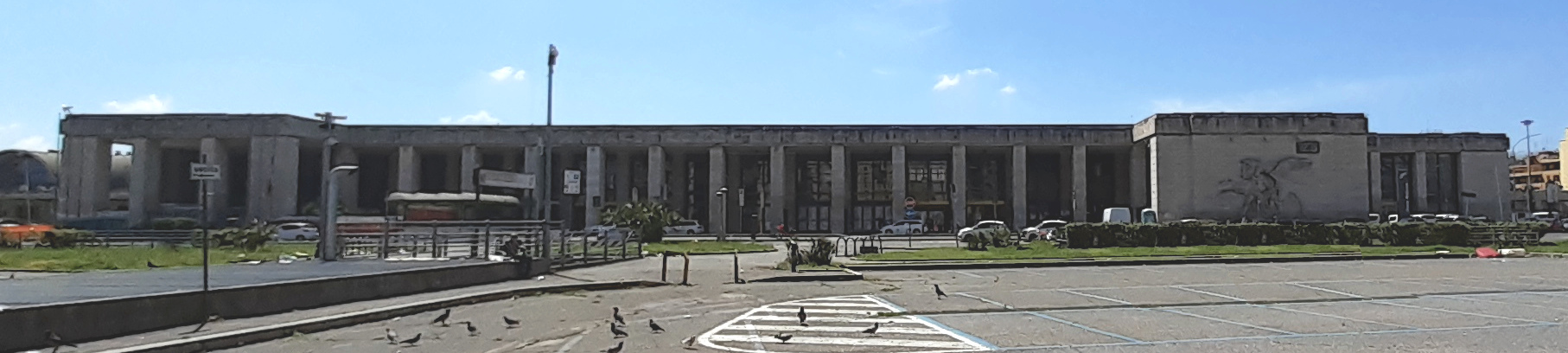
- Station building in Piazzale dei Partigiani

General information
- Location: Piazzale dei Partigiani; 00154 Rome; Italy
- Coordinates: 41°52′22″N 12°29′04″E
- Elevation: 22 metres (72 ft)
- Owner: Rete Ferroviaria Italiana
- Operator: Rete Ferroviaria Italiana
- Lines: Pisa-Livorno-Grosseto–Roma; Orte-Fiumicino Aeroporto; Roma Tiburtina-Viterbo; Roma Termini-Civitavecchia
- Distance: 6.692 km (4.158 mi) from Roma Termini
- Platforms: 6 (11 tracks)
- Connections: Urban railway station (Roma Porta San Paolo, Rome-Lido railway); Underground Piramide, Line B; Bus Stop; Tram Stop; Taxi Stand

Construction
- Architect: Roberto Narducci

Other information
- IATA code: IRR

History
- Opened: October 28, 1940
- Electrified: 3,000 V
Location
- Click on the map for a fullscreen view

Roma Ostiense is a railway station in Piazza dei Partigiani serving the Ostiense district of Rome, Italy, a short distance from the Porta San Paolo. It is run by the Rete Ferroviaria Italiana arm of the Ferrovie dello Stato Italiane group and the commuter rail lines FL1, FL3, and FL5 run through the station. It is linked with the Piramide Metro B station and the Roma Porta San Paolo station on the Rome-Lido railway line.

== History ==
Hitler's arrival in Rome meet at the station by King Victor Emmanuel III and Mussolini.

To commemorate the forthcoming visit of Adolf Hitler to Rome in 1938, the current Ostiense station was built, replacing an existing rural railway station, with the aim of creating a monumental station to receive the German dictator. A new road was also built to connect the station with Porta San Paolo – this was initially named Via A. Hitler but, after World War II, it became Viale delle Cave Ardeatine, as a way of commemorating the victims of Nazi occupation.

Hitler's visit to Rome is cinematically recreated in director Ettore Scola's film Una giornata particolare, who also used archived newsreel footage showing the actual meeting between Hitler, Benito Mussolini, and Victor Emanuel III.

== The building ==
Italian architect Roberto Narducci designed the station. In addition to being built in the architectural style favoured by Hitler, the design of the station's marble facade was almost identical to that of the Italian pavilion at the 1942 Rome World's Fair (a design never fully realised due to the Second World War).

The entire facade is made of Travertine marble and the entrance is marked by a columned portico. On the right side of the façade is a relief by Francesco Nagni representing the mythical figures of Bellerophon and Pegasus. On the left is a fountain built in 1957. A series of black and white floor mosaics (created by Giulio Rosso) illustrate various themes and legends of Rome's history.

South of the tracks, the station authority constructed a new section to help Ostiense serve as a terminal station for passengers arriving from Leonardo da Vinci Airport during the 1990 World Cup, which accumulated a variety of commercial activities. However, following the decline in the number of passengers after the end of the World Cup, the new section was quickly abandoned and the various shops that were housed there began to close. In 2012, the building was converted to a new branch of Mario Batali's restaurant/market chain Eataly.

== The square ==
The fountain of Piazzale dei Partigiani immortalized in the final scene of Carlo Verdone's Un sacco bello in 1980.

The square outside of the station was named Piazzale dei Partigiani after World War II. Now, the square's primary function is a bus terminal and parking facility. Before 1990, however, the piazza was embellished with a well-maintained garden and a now-nonfunctioning fountain that was built in the 1950s as part of the design of the station's architect Roberto Narducci. The fountain was inexplicably excluded from the modernization and renovations for the 1990 World Cup, even though the square was part of the ambitious "Cento Piazze" beautification project. The small palm gardens that surround the parking lot are today occupied by a number of homeless people, asylum seekers, and political refugees. Every Monday and Friday, Red Cross volunteers use the square to distribute food to the city's homeless population, despite protests from the area's residents who say that the organization arbitrarily selected the site.

== Services ==
The station offer the following services:

- Ticket office
- Automatic Ticket Machine
- Waiting Room
- Toilets
- Polizia Ferroviaria Offices
- Bar
- Restaurant
- Taxi Stand

== Interchanges ==
- Piramide station on Line B on the Rome Metro.
- Roma Porta San Paolo station on the Rome–Lido railway (Metromare).
- 3 (Tram Line) - 23 - 30 express - 75 - 77 - 83 - 96 - 280 - 715 - 716 - 719 - 769 - 775 - 780 - n716.
- Regional trains of Lazio Regional Railways
- Regional train to Rome Fiumicino Airport

== Gallery ==
Ostiense station shortly after completion in 1940

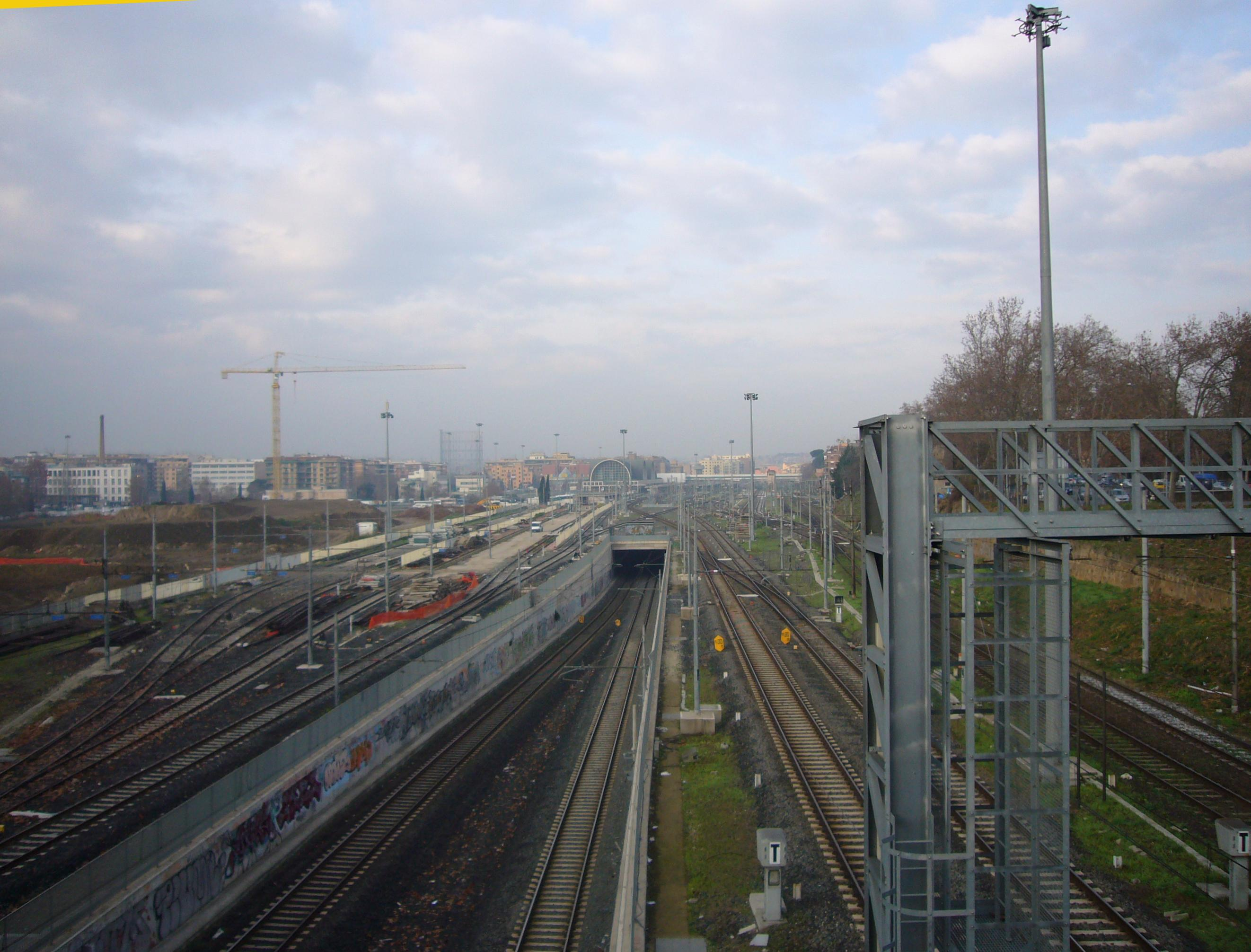
View of the lines from the entrance of Cristoforo Colombo highway

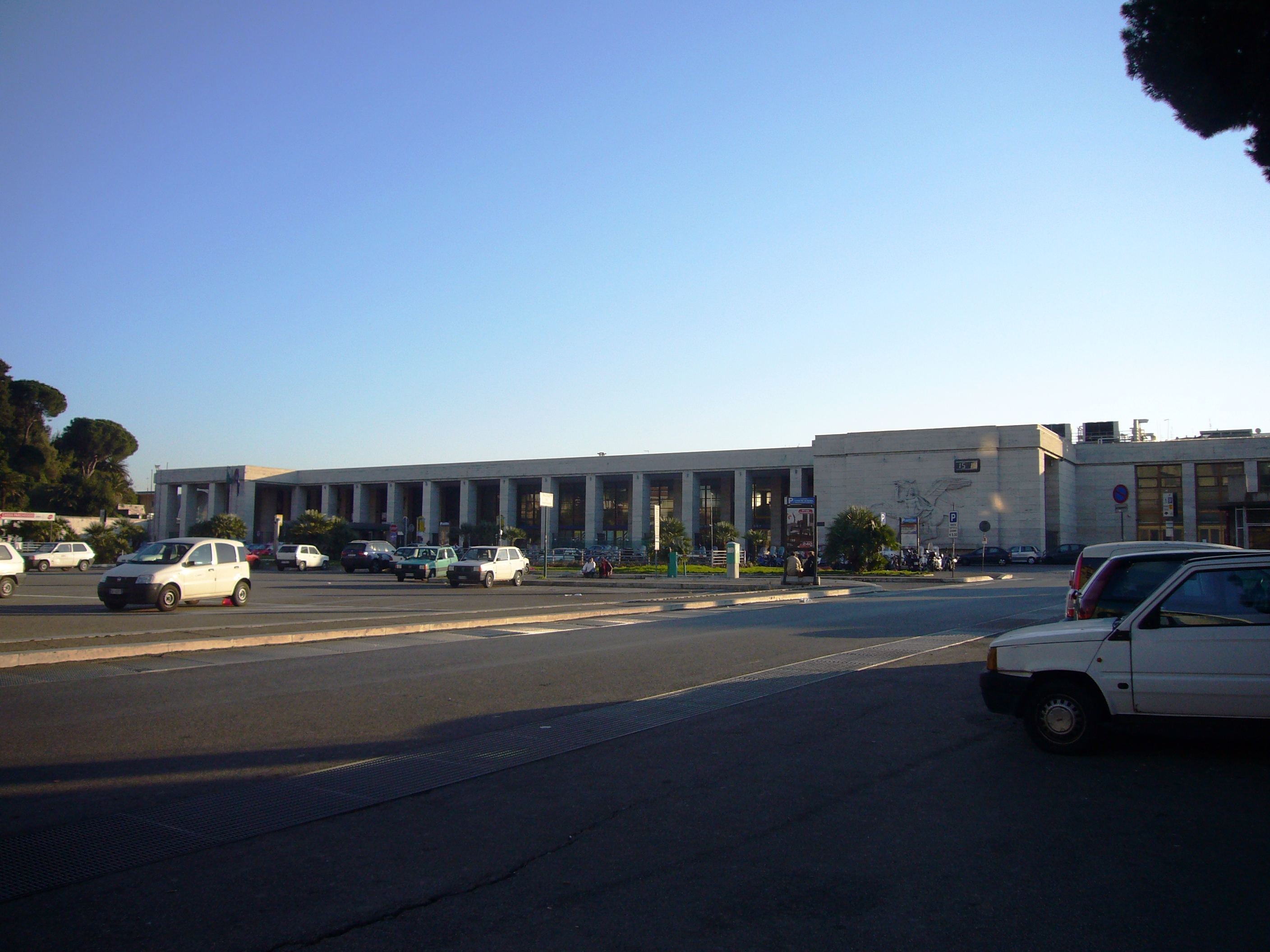
Station and piazzale

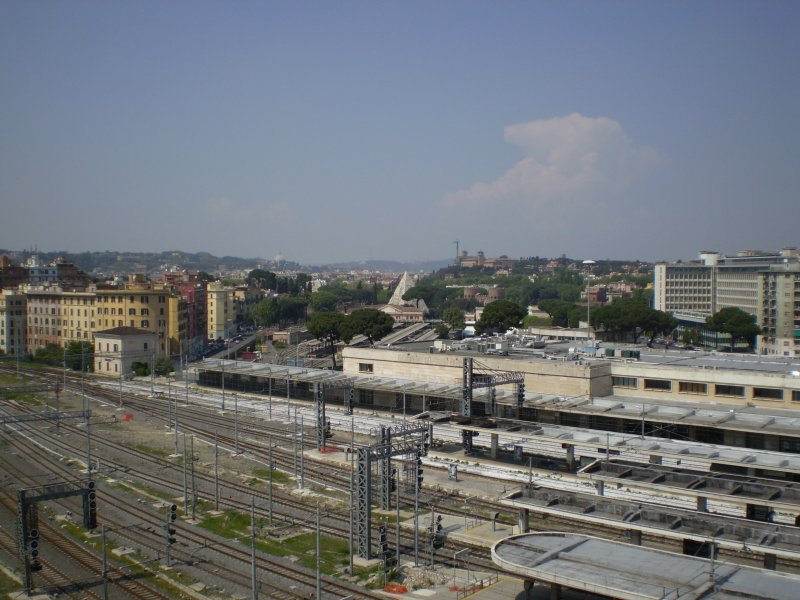
The station from a neighbouring building, with the Piramide station in the background

== See also ==
- Roma Termini
- Roma Tiburtina
- History of rail transport in Italy
- List of railway stations in Lazio
- Rail transport in Italy
- Railway stations in Italy

Preceding station	Lazio regional railways	Following station
Roma Tuscolana towards Orte	FL1	Roma Trastevere towards Fiumicino Aeroporto
Terminus	FL3	Roma Trastevere towards Viterbo Porta Fiorentina
Roma Tuscolana towards Roma Termini	FL5	Roma Trastevere towards Civitavecchia
