= Roma Nomentana railway station =

Railway station in Rome, Italy

Roma Nomentana
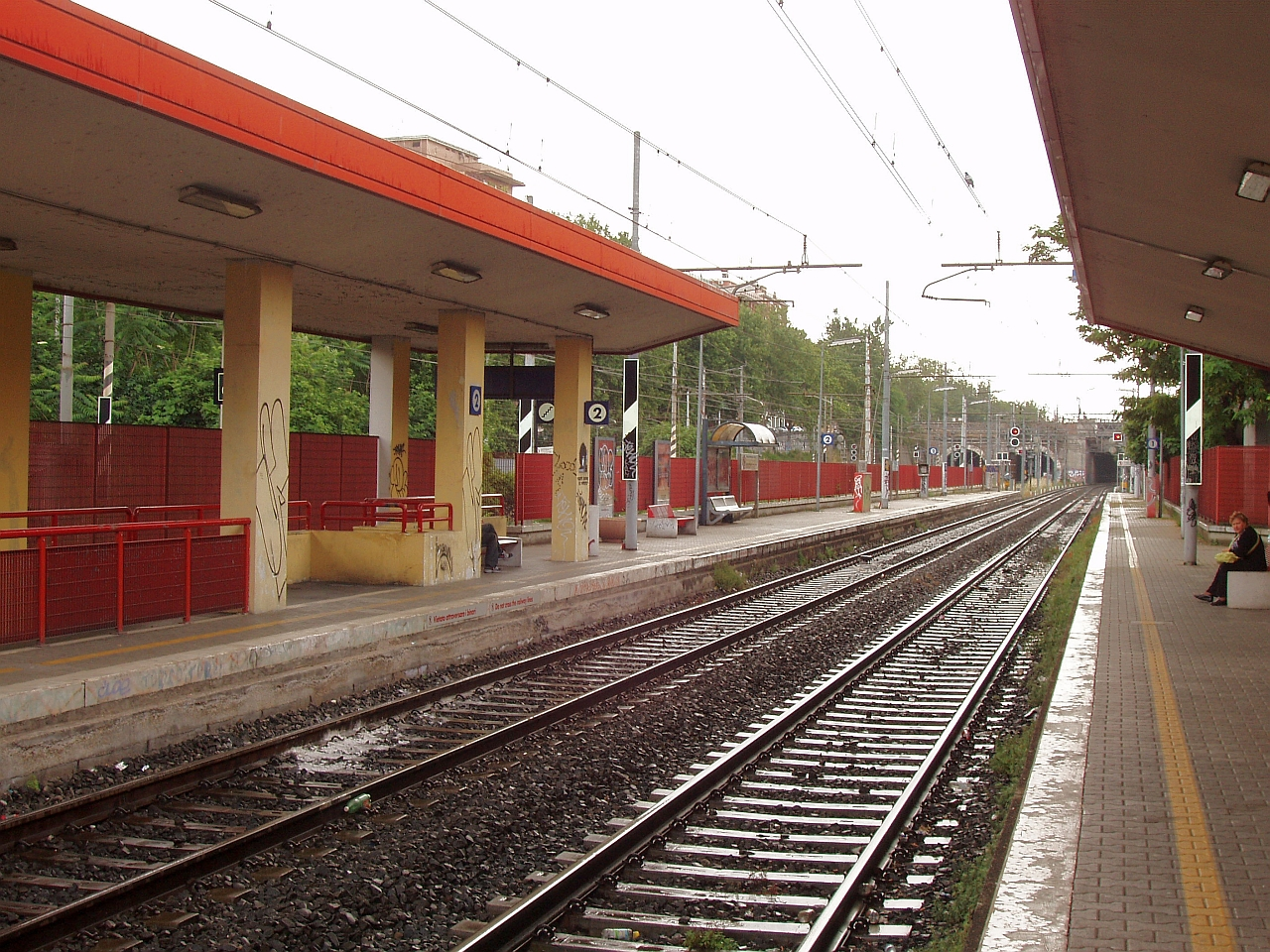

General information
- Location: Italy
- Coordinates: 41°55′57″N 12°31′25″E
- Owner: Rete Ferroviaria Italiana
- Lines: Orte—Fiumicino Aeroporto; Firenze–Roma; Roma–Pescara
- Platforms: 4

History
- Opened: 25 November 1983
Location
- Click on the map for a fullscreen view

The Roma Nomentana railway station is a railway station in Rome located between the African quarter and the neighborhood Monte Sacro, connected to each other by a pedestrian underpass. The station and exchange car park can be accessed from via Valle d'Aosta, a road located between Via Nomentana and via delle Valli.

== History ==
The station was opened on 25 November 1983.
