= Fiumicino Aeroporto railway station =

Railway station of Rome Fiumicino Airport

Fiumicino Aeroporto
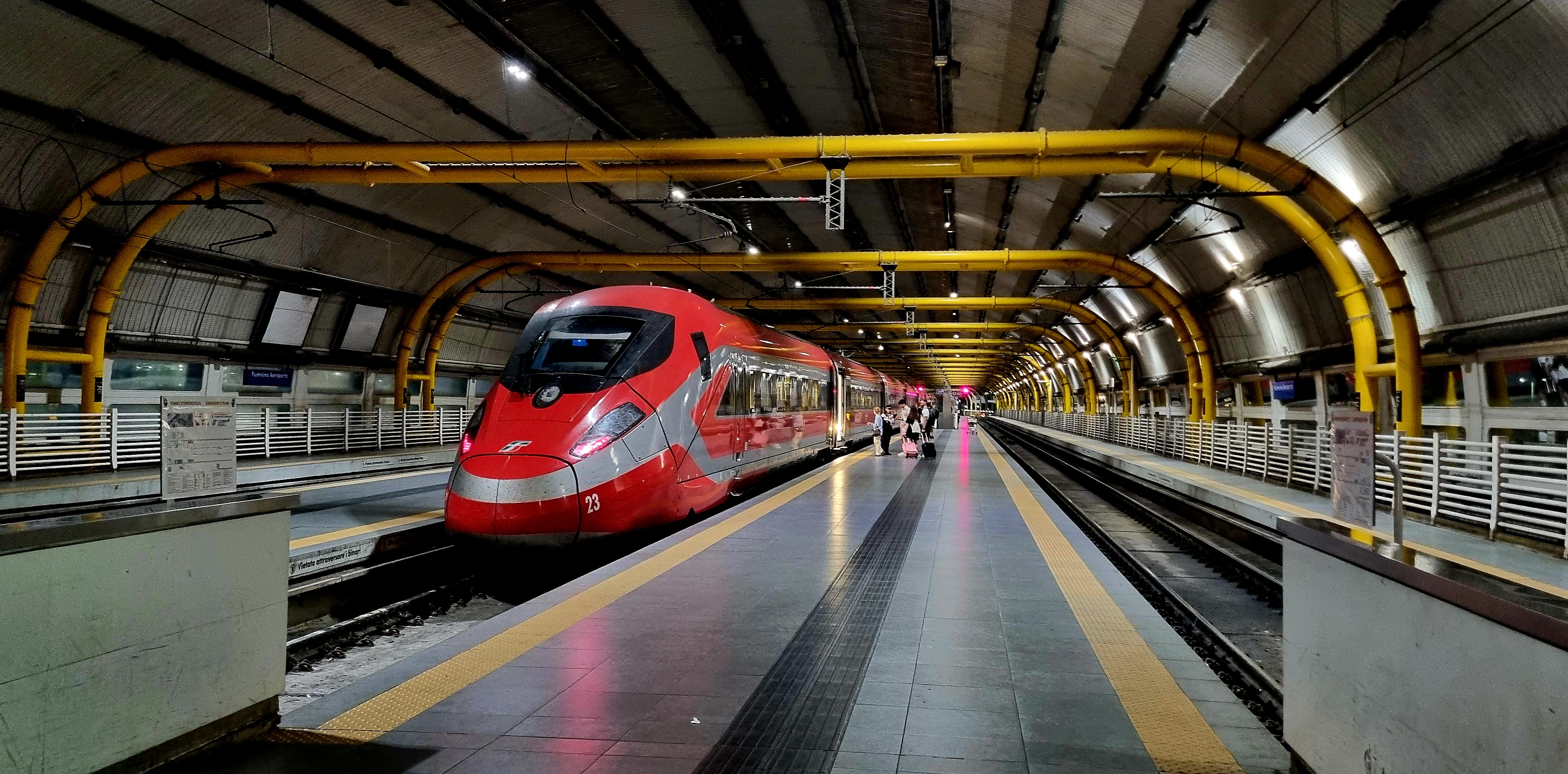
- The train hall

General information
- Location: Via Generale Felice Santini 11–14; 00054 Fiumicino RM; Fiumicino, Rome, Lazio; Italy
- Coordinates: 41°47′39″N 12°15′04″E
- Operator: Rete Ferroviaria Italiana
- Lines: Orte - Fiumicino Aeroporto; LeoExp Leonardo Express; Rome–Florence (high-speed); Rome–Naples (high-speed)
- Distance: 31.406 km (19.515 mi) from Roma Termini
- Platforms: 3
- Train operators: Trenitalia
- Connections: Leonardo da Vinci-Fiumicino Airport; Urban and suburban buses

Other information
- Classification: Gold

History
- Opened: 27 May 1990; 36 years ago
Location
- Location within Lazio Location within Italy

Fiumicino Aeroporto railway station, or Fiumicino Airport railway station (Italian: Stazione di Fiumicino Aeroporto), is sited within the Leonardo da Vinci-Fiumicino Airport (Italian: Aeroporto Leonardo da Vinci di Fiumicino) (IATA code: FCO) in Fiumicino, Lazio, central Italy. Opened in 1990, the station is the southwestern terminus of the Rome–Fiumicino railway.

The airport and station are also known as Rome-Fiumicino Airport (Italian: Aeroporto di Roma-Fiumicino), because the airport is the main airport for Rome.

The station is managed by Rete Ferroviaria Italiana (RFI). Train services are operated by Trenitalia. Each company is a subsidiary of Ferrovie dello Stato (FS), Italy's state-owned rail company. RFI classifies the station as category "Gold".

== Location ==
Fiumicino Aeroporto railway station is situated at Via Generale Felice Santini 11–14, directly opposite Terminal 3.

== Features ==
The station has a passenger building and train hall that houses the platforms and ticket machines.

It is equipped with three platforms, all of them for passenger service.

== Train movements ==
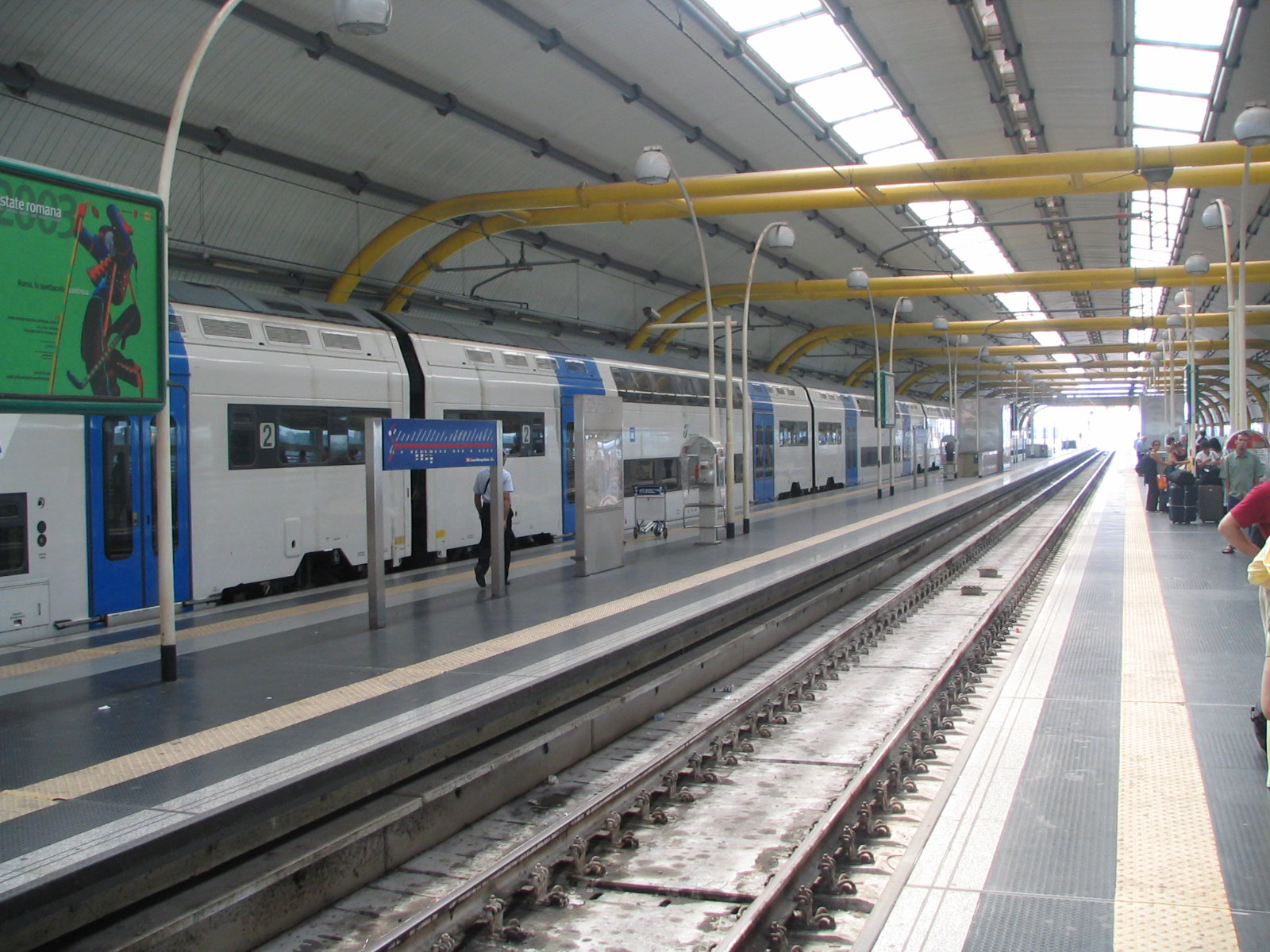
A TAF operating on the FL1 line at the station

The Leonardo Express is a first-class only non-stop service linking Fiumicino Aeroporto with Roma Termini railway station in approximately 30 minutes. It operates every 15 minutes from early morning until late evening.

Frequent regional trains link Fiumicino Aeroporto with destinations in Latium north of Rome, including Fara Sabina, Poggio Mirteto and Orte (terminus station for this line). The station is also the terminus of the Ferrovie regionali del Lazio FL1 commuter service from Orte. These trains stop at all the stations along the way, including important Roman Stations as Roma Trastevere, Roma Ostiense and Roma Tiburtina. While from last two it is possible to commute to the Linea B subway line, in Roma Trastevere the Tram 8 (with one terminus at Piazza Venezia) provides a fast connection with Trastevere and the heart of the city center.

The station is also served by direct Frecciargento and Frecciarossa services to destinations such as Florence, Bologna, Venice and Naples.

== See also ==
- FL1 (Lazio regional railways)
- History of rail transport in Italy
- List of railway stations in Lazio
- Rail transport in Italy
- Railway stations in Italy
