= List of railway stations in Lazio =

This is the list of the railway stations in Lazio owned by:

- Rete Ferroviaria Italiana, a branch of the Italian state company Ferrovie dello Stato;
- ATAC SpA.

== RFI stations ==
Station	Locality	Province	Category
Acqua Acetosa	Ciampino	Rome (Roma)	Bronze
Albano Laziale	Albano Laziale	Rome (Roma)	Silver
Anagni-Fiuggi	Anagni	Frosinone	Silver
Anguillara	Anguillara Sabazia	Rome (Roma)	Silver
Antrodoco Centro	Antrodoco	Rieti	Bronze
Antrodoco-Borgo Velino	Antrodoco	Rieti	Bronze
Anzio	Anzio	Rome (Roma)	Silver
Anzio Colonia	Anzio	Rome (Roma)	Silver
Appiano	Roma	Rome (Roma)	Silver
Aprilia	Aprilia	Latina	Silver
Arce	Arce	Frosinone	Bronze
Arpino	Arpino	Frosinone	Bronze
Arsoli	Arsoli	Rome (Roma)	Bronze
Bagni di Tivoli	Tivoli	Rome (Roma)	Silver
Bassano in Teverina	Bassano in Teverina	Viterbo	Bronze
Bracciano	Bracciano	Rome (Roma)	Silver
Campo di Carne	Campo di Carne	Latina	Silver
Campoleone	Campoleone	Latina	Silver
Cancelliera	Cancelliera	Rome (Roma)	Bronze
Canetra	Canetra	Rieti	Bronze
Capannelle	Roma	Rome (Roma)	Silver
Capocroce	Capocroce	Latina	Bronze
Capranica-Sutri	Capranica	Viterbo	Silver
Casabianca	Ciampino	Rome (Roma)	Bronze
Cassino	Cassino	Frosinone	Gold
Castel Gandolfo	Castel Gandolfo	Rome (Roma)	Silver
Castel Madama	Castel Madama	Rome (Roma)	Bronze
Castel Sant'Angelo	Castel Sant'Angelo	Rieti	Bronze
Castro-Pofi-Vallecorsa	Castro dei Volsci	Frosinone	Silver
Ceccano	Ceccano	Frosinone	Silver
Cecchina	Cecchina	Rome (Roma)	Silver
Ceprano-Falvaterra	Ceprano	Frosinone	Silver
Cesano di Roma	Cesano di Roma	Rome (Roma)	Silver
Ciampino	Ciampino	Rome (Roma)	Gold
Cisterna di Latina	Cisterna di Latina	Latina	Silver
Cittaducale	Cittaducale	Rieti	Bronze
Civita Castellana-Magliano	Civita Castellana	Viterbo	Silver
Civitavecchia	Civitavecchia	Rome (Roma)	Gold
Colfelice	Colfelice	Frosinone	Bronze
Colle Mattia	Colle Mattia	Rome (Roma)	Silver
Colleferro-Segni-Paliano	Colleferro	Rome (Roma)	Silver
Collevecchio-Poggio Sommavilla	Collevecchio	Rieti	Bronze
Colonna Galleria	Colonna	Rome (Roma)	Silver
Compre-San Vincenzo	Le Compre	Frosinone	Bronze
Contigliano	Contigliano	Rieti	Bronze
Fara Sabina-Montelibretti	Fara in Sabina	Rieti	Silver
Ferentino-Supino	Ferentino	Frosinone	Silver
Fidene	Roma	Rome (Roma)	Silver
Fiera di Roma	Roma	Rome (Roma)	Silver
Fiumicino Aeroporto	Fiumicino	Rome (Roma)	Gold
Fondi-Sperlonga	Fondi	Latina	Silver
Fontana Liri	Fontana Liri	Frosinone	Bronze
Fontana Liri Inferiore	Fontana Liri	Frosinone	Bronze
Fontanarosa-Cervaro	Cervaro	Frosinone	Bronze
Formia-Gaeta	Formia	Latina	Gold
Frascati	Frascati	Rome (Roma)	Silver
Frasso	Frasso	Latina	Bronze
Frosinone	Frosinone	Frosinone	Silver
Gallese in Teverina	Gallese	Viterbo	Bronze
Gavignano Sabino	Gavignano	Rieti	Silver
Gemelli	Roma	Rome (Roma)	Silver
Greccio	Greccio	Rieti	Bronze
Grotte Santo Stefano	Grotte Santo Stefano	Viterbo	Bronze
Guidonia-Montecelio-Sant'Angelo	Guidonia	Rome (Roma)	Silver
Ipogeo degli Ottavi	Roma	Rome (Roma)	Silver
Isola Liri	Isola del Liri	Frosinone	Bronze
Isoletta-San Giovanni Incarico	Isoletta	Frosinone	Silver
Itri	Itri	Latina	Bronze
La Fiora	Terracina	Latina	Bronze
La Storta	Roma	Rome (Roma)	Silver
Labico	Labico	Rome (Roma)	Silver
Labro-Moggio	Labro	Rieti	Bronze
Ladispoli-Cerveteri	Ladispoli	Rome (Roma)	Silver
La Giustiniana	Roma	Rome (Roma)	Silver
Lanuvio	Lanuvio	Rome (Roma)	Silver
La Rustica Città	Roma	Rome (Roma)	Silver
La Rustica Uir	Roma	Rome (Roma)	Silver
Latina	Latina	Latina	Silver
Lido di Lavinio	Lavinio	Rome (Roma)	Silver
Lunghezza	Roma	Rome (Roma)	Silver
Maccarese-Fregene	Fregene	Rome (Roma)	Silver
Magliana	Roma	Rome (Roma)	Silver
Mandela-Sambuci	Mandela	Rome (Roma)	Bronze
Manziana-Canale Monterano	Manziana	Rome (Roma)	Silver
Marcellina-Palombara	Marcellina	Rome (Roma)	Silver
Marechiaro	Marechiaro	Rome (Roma)	Silver
Marina di Cerveteri	Cerveteri	Rome (Roma)	Silver
Marino Laziale	Marino	Rome (Roma)	Silver
Minturno-Scauri	Minturno	Latina	Silver
Montalto di Castro	Montalto di Castro	Viterbo	Silver
Monte San Biagio	Monte San Biagio	Latina	Silver
Montefiascone	Montefiascone	Viterbo	Silver
Monterotondo-Mentana	Monterotondo	Rome (Roma)	Silver
Morolo	Morolo	Frosinone	Bronze
Muratella	Roma	Rome (Roma)	Silver
Nettuno	Nettuno	Rome (Roma)	Silver
Nuovo Salario	Roma	Rome (Roma)	Silver
Olgiata	Roma	Rome (Roma)	Silver
Oriolo	Oriolo Romano	Viterbo	Silver
Orte	Orte	Viterbo	Gold
Ottavia	Roma	Rome (Roma)	Silver
Padiglione	Padiglione	Rome (Roma)	Silver
Palmiro Togliatti	Roma	Rome (Roma)	Silver
Pantanella	Ciampino	Rome (Roma)	Bronze
Parco Leonardo	Fiumicino	Rome (Roma)	Silver
Pavona	Pavona	Rome (Roma)	Silver
Piana Bella di Montelibretti	Montelibretti	Rome (Roma)	Silver
Piedimonte-Villa Santa Lucia-Aquino	Piedimonte San Germano	Frosinone	Bronze
Poggio Fidoni	Poggio Fidoni	Rieti	Bronze
Poggio Mirteto	Poggio Mirteto	Rieti	Silver
Pomezia-Santa Palomba	Pomezia	Rome (Roma)	Silver
Ponte Galeria	Roma	Rome (Roma)	Silver
Priverno-Fossanova	Priverno	Latina	Silver
Quattro Venti	Rome	Rome	Silver
Rieti	Rieti	Rieti	Silver
Rocca d'Evandro-San Vittore	San Vittore del Lazio	Frosinone	Bronze
Rocca di Corno	Rocca di Corno	Rieti	Bronze
Rocca di Fondi	Rocca di Fondi	Rieti	Bronze
Roccasecca	Roccasecca	Frosinone	Silver
Roma Aurelia	Roma	Rome (Roma)	Silver
Roma Balduina	Roma	Rome (Roma)	Silver
Roma Monte Mario	Roma	Rome (Roma)	Silver
Roma Nomentana	Roma	Rome (Roma)	Silver
Roma Ostiense	Roma	Rome (Roma)	Gold
Roma Prenestina	Roma	Rome (Roma)	Silver
Roma San Filippo Neri	Roma	Rome (Roma)	Silver
Roma San Pietro	Roma	Rome (Roma)	Gold
Roma Termini	Roma	Rome (Roma)	Platinum
Roma Tiburtina	Roma	Rome (Roma)	Platinum
Roma Trastevere	Roma	Rome (Roma)	Gold
Roma Tuscolana	Roma	Rome (Roma)	Silver
Roviano	Roviano	Rome (Roma)	Bronze
Sant'Eurosia	Sant'Eurosia	Rome (Roma)	Bronze
San Gennaro	Genzano di Roma	Rome (Roma)	Bronze
Santa Maria delle Mole	Santa Maria delle Mole	Rome (Roma)	Silver
Santa Marinella	Santa Marinella	Rome (Roma)	Silver
Santa Severa	Santa Severa	Rome (Roma)	Silver
Santopadre	Santopadre	Frosinone	Bronze
Sassone	Sassone	Rome (Roma)	Bronze
Serenissima	Roma	Rome (Roma)	Silver
Settebagni	Roma	Rome (Roma)	Silver
Sezze Romano	Sezze	Latina	Silver
Sgurgola	Sgurgola	Frosinone	Bronze
Sipicciano	Sipicciano	Viterbo	Bronze
Sipicciano-San Nicola	Sipicciano	Viterbo	Bronze
Sora	Sora	Frosinone	Silver
Sorgenti del Peschiera	Cittaducale	Rieti	Bronze
Stimigliano	Stimigliano	Rieti	Silver
Tarquinia	Tarquinia	Viterbo	Silver
Terracina	Terracina	Latina	Silver
Tivoli	Tivoli	Rome (Roma)	Silver
Tor Sapienza	Roma	Rome (Roma)	Silver
Tor Vergata	Tor Vergata	Rome (Roma)	Silver
Torre in Pietra-Palidoro	Palidoro	Rome (Roma)	Silver
Torricola	Roma	Rome (Roma)	Silver
Tre Croci	Tre Croci	Viterbo	Bronze
Val D'Ala	Roma	Rome (Roma)	Bronze
Valle Aurelia	Roma	Rome (Roma)	Silver
Valmontone	Valmontone	Rome (Roma)	Silver
Velletri	Velletri	Rome (Roma)	Silver
Vetralla	Vetralla	Viterbo	Silver
Vicovaro	Vicovaro	Rome (Roma)	Bronze
Vigna di Valle	Vigna di Valle	Rome (Roma)	Bronze
Villa Bonelli	Roma	Rome (Roma)	Silver
Villa Claudia	Villa Claudia	Rome (Roma)	Silver
Villetta	Castel Gandolfo	Rome (Roma)	Bronze
Viterbo Porta Fiorentina	Viterbo	Viterbo	Silver
Viterbo Porta Romana	Viterbo	Viterbo	Silver
Zagarolo	Zagarolo	Rome (Roma)	Silver

== ATAC stations ==
Station	Locality	Province
Acilia railway station	Rome	Rome
Acqua Acetosa railway station	Rome	Rome
Alessi railway station	Rome	Rome
Bagnaia railway station	Viterbo	Viterbo
Balzani railway station	Rome	Rome
Basilica San Paolo railway station	Rome	Rome
Berardi railway station	Rome	Rome
Campi Sportivi railway station	Rome	Rome
Casal Bernocchi-Centro Giano railway station	Rome	Rome
Castel Fusano railway station	Rome	Rome
Castelnuovo di Porto railway station	Castelnuovo di Porto	Rome
Catalano railway station	Civita Castellana	Viterbo
Centocelle railway station	Rome	Rome
Centro RAI railway station	Rome	Rome
Civita Castellana railway station	Civita Castellana	Viterbo
Corchiano railway station	Corchiano	Viterbo
Cristoforo Colombo railway station	Rome	Rome
Due Ponti railway station	Rome	Rome
EUR Magliana railway station	Rome	Rome
Fabrica di Roma railway station	Fabrica di Roma	Viterbo
Faleri railway station	Fabrica di Roma	Viterbo
Filarete railway station	Rome	Rome
Grottarossa railway station	Rome	Rome
Labaro railway station	Rome	Rome
La Celsa railway station	Rome	Rome
La Fornacchia railway station	Soriano nel Cimino	Viterbo
La Giustiniana railway station	Rome	Rome
Lido di Ostia Centro railway station	Rome	Rome
Lido di Ostia Nord railway station	Rome	Rome
Magliano Romano railway station	Morlupo	Rome
Monte Antenne railway station	Rome	Rome
Montebello railway station	Rome	Rome
Morlupo railway station	Morlupo	Rome
Ostia Antica railway station	Rome	Rome
Pian Paradiso railway station	Civita Castellana	Viterbo
Piazza Euclide railway station	Rome	Rome
Ponte Casilino railway station	Rome	Rome
Ponzano railway station	Civita Castellana	Viterbo
Porta Maggiore railway station	Rome	Rome
Prima Porta railway station	Rome	Rome
Riano railway station	Riano	Rome
Rignano Flaminio railway station	Rignano Flaminio	Rome
Roma Laziali railway station	Rome	Rome
Roma Porta San Paolo railway station	Rome	Rome
Sacrofano railway station	Rome	Rome
Santa Bibiana railway station	Rome	Rome
Sant'Elena railway station	Rome	Rome
Sant'Oreste railway station	Rignano Flaminio	Rome
Saxa Rubra railway station	Rome	Rome
Soriano nel Cimino railway station	Soriano nel Cimino	Viterbo
Stella Polare railway station	Rome	Rome
Tor di Quinto railway station	Rome	Rome
Tor di Valle railway station	Rome	Rome
Tor Pignattara railway station	Rome	Rome
Vallerano railway station	Vallerano	Viterbo
Vignanello railway station	Vignanello	Viterbo
Villini railway station	Rome	Rome
Viterbo railway station	Viterbo	Rome
Vitinia railway station	Rome	Rome
Vitorchiano railway station	Vitorchiano	Viterbo

== See also ==
- Railway stations in Italy
- Ferrovie dello Stato
- Rail transport in Italy
- High-speed rail in Italy
- Transport in Italy
