= Rome–Fiumicino railway =

Roma-Fiumicino railway
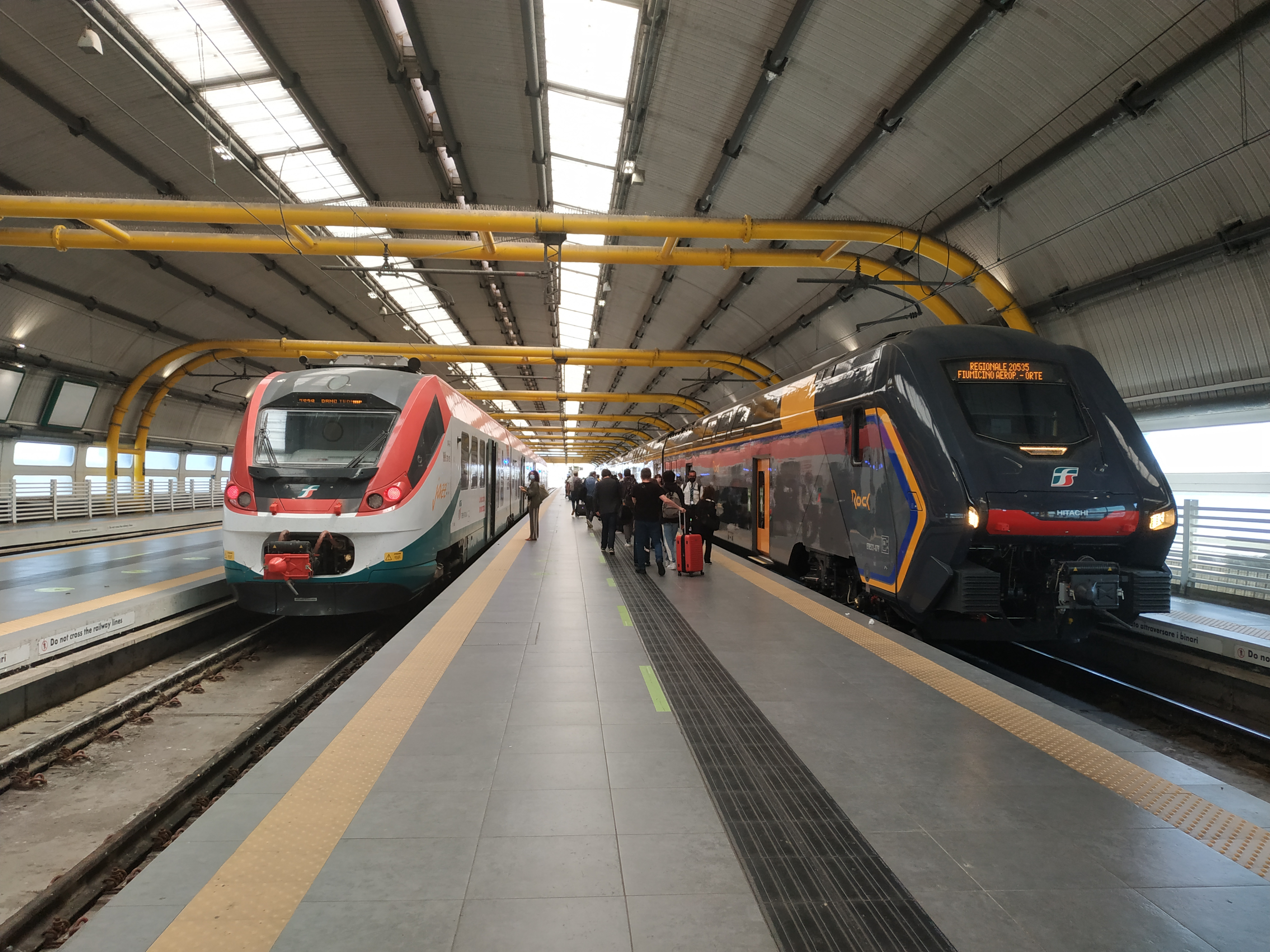
- Fiumicino Airport station

Overview
- Status: Operational
- Owner: RFI
- Locale: Italy
- Termini: Roma Trastevere; Fiumicino Aeroporto

Service
- Type: Heavy rail
- Operator(s): Trenitalia

History
- Opened: 1878 and 1990

Technical
- Line length: 31 km (19 mi)
- Number of tracks: 2
- Track gauge: 1,435 mm (4 ft 8 1/2 in)
- Electrification: 3000 V DC

The Rome–Fiumicino railway is an urban railway line in Rome.

== History ==
The railway link between Rome and Fiumicino was officially opened on 6 May 1878, when a branch of the Livorno–Rome railway (also called the ferrovia Tirrenica—"Tyrrhenian Railway"), which was completed in 1859. It ran from Ponte Galeria station to Fiumicino, where a station was located for passenger traffic and there was a connection for freight traffic to the river port, ending at Fiumicino Porto Canale goods yard.

Electrification with overhead line at 3000 V DC was activated on 14 November 1938. Goods traffic began to decline from the 1960s, due to the decline of the Fiumicino river port. In 1990, rail traffic ended on the link to the river port, but it was another ten years before it was closed. However, the line began to assume a certain importance for passenger traffic with the opening of Fiumicino Airport. A study was carried out in September 1960 into the possible doubling of the line and the building of a branch from Porto station running directly to the airport. The project was initially shelved, but it was resumed in the mid-eighties. A variation was built that branches off a few metres before the entry to Porto station, running entirely on a viaduct to a station called Fiumicino Aeroporto.

The new line was opened on 27 May 1990. At the same time, the former Porto station was closed; it had already lost its services because of its lack of patronage as it was too far from the airport. Direct Rome–Airport services were established (currently known as the Leonardo Express), initially operating from Roma Ostiense station. Later services were extended to Roma Termini station. With the establishment of these services, the freight trains on the Livorno–Rome railway were diverted to run on the Roma Trastevere–Roma San Pietro–Maccarese route. In 1994, the FR1 suburban services operated to/from Fara Sabina, with four services an hour to Fiumicino Airport and one to Fiumicino Città. On 30 January 2000. the Porto junction–Fiumicino Città services were abolished. After a few years of neglect, the railway infrastructure was removed and dismantled from 2007 as part of a redevelopment plan aimed at building a new district, including the new headquarters of the municipality of Fiumicino.

== Route ==
Departing from Roma Termini, the railway reaches Roma Trastevere station where it leaves the completed part of the ring railway, with a curve to the left. Subsequently the line touches the Tiber for a few metres and then runs through the Magliana district, where the stations of Villa Bonelli (opened in 1999) and Magliana are located.

At this point the railway runs next to the Via della Magliana (passing through Muratella station), passes under the Grande Raccordo Anulare and runs between the Via della Magliana and the A91 motorway. At Ponte Galeria, the line reaches the station of the same name, where a line branches off to Fiumicino and Pisa. Turning left, the line passes under the A91; Fiera di Roma station is located a few metres past the flyover.

The line subsequently continues parallel with the motorway (with a stop in the district of Parco Leonardo) to the airport, where, until 2001 there was an operating point called Porto junction where the line branched to Fiumicino Airport station and to Fiumicino station. The Airport branch continues on a viaduct for a few kilometres to the first floor of the international airport building, where the station is located.

The old branch continued straight through the town of Porto (where Porto station was located), passing under the SS 296 road and reached Fiumicino at Coccia di Morto, where the only level crossing on the line was located. Fiumicino station, which had three tracks, one of which was used for goods traffic, was located at the end of Via Portuensis. This goods track crossed the Via degli Orti and passed, with a curve to the left, to the right bank of the navigable canal where Fiumicino Porto Canale goods yard was located.
