= Treno ad alta frequentazione =

Italian electric multiple unit train

FS ALe 426/502 FNM E.760/761
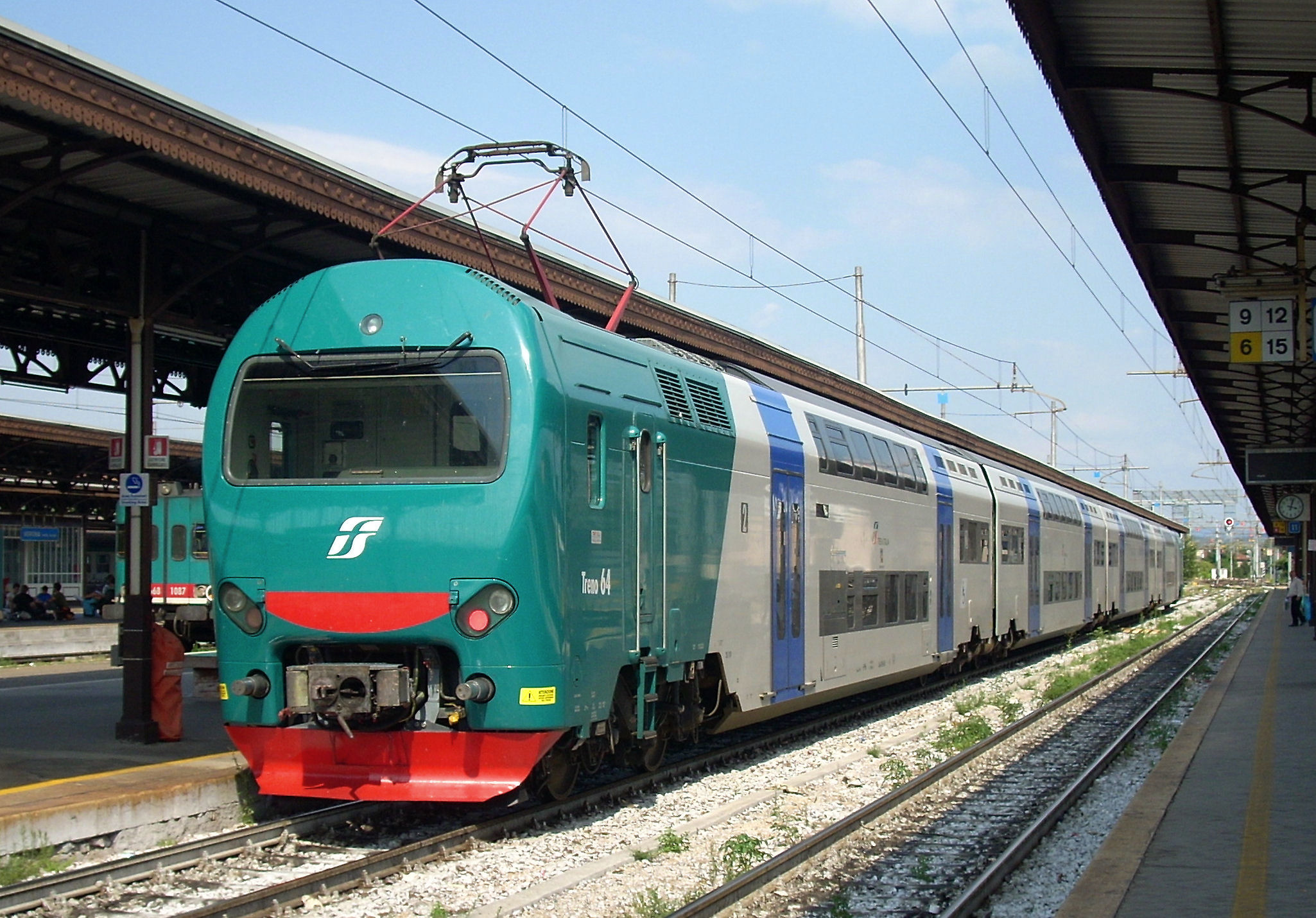
- A Trenitalia TAF
Type and origin
- Power type: Electric
- Builder: Ansaldo, Breda Costruzioni Ferroviarie, ABB, Firema
- Build date: 1996–2000
- Total produced: 150
Specifications
- Configuration
  - AAR: Bo2+22+22+2Bo (EMU4)
- Gauge: 1,435 mm (4 ft 8 1/2 in) standard gauge
- Width: 2,820 mm (9 ft 3 in)
- Height: 4,300 mm (14 ft 1 1/4 in)
- Electric system/s: 3000 V DC Overhead
- Current pickup: Pantograph
- Traction motors: Three phase asynchronous
- Gear ratio: 20/101
Performance figures
- Maximum speed: 140 km/h (87 mph)
- Power output: 3,640 kW (4,880 hp)
- Tractive effort: 214 kN (48,000 lb_{f})
Career
- Operators: Trenitalia, FNM, ONCF
- First run: 1997
- Disposition: In service

FS ALe 426/502 FNM E.760/761

Specifications
- Train length: 103,970 mm (341 ft 1 1/4 in)
- Weight: 273 t (269 long tons; 301 short tons)
- Braking system: Oerlikon FV3E

ALe 426/506 TAF (also known as Treno ad Alta Frequentazione or simply TAF) is an Italian Electric Multiple Unit (EMU) used mainly on commuter regional trains. Concept design has been made by Italian designer Pininfarina.

Two different companies employ them: Trenitalia and Ferrovie Nord Milano (FNM). A slightly modified version of the was purchased by Moroccan Railways in 2006.

In 2024, FNM announced a series of upgrades to the TAF. The first upgraded train was finished in Milan on January 24, 2024, and the project is set to be completed by the end of 2025.

== Description ==
Each train is formed by fixed sections of four bi-level pieces: two motorized units (ALe 426/506) and two coaches between them (Le 736). Two sections can be coupled together, but by now it is not possible on Trenitalia units (on FNM ones is common practice).

The total capacity is of 469 seated and 372 standing passengers.

== Specifications ==
ALe 426/506 employs asynchronous three-phase traction motors feed by the 3000 V DC catenary. Motors are mounted on one bogie per motorized unit, for a total of two motorized bogies per section.

== Operators ==
=== ONCF ===
The ONCF operates a fleet of 24 trains in Morocco.

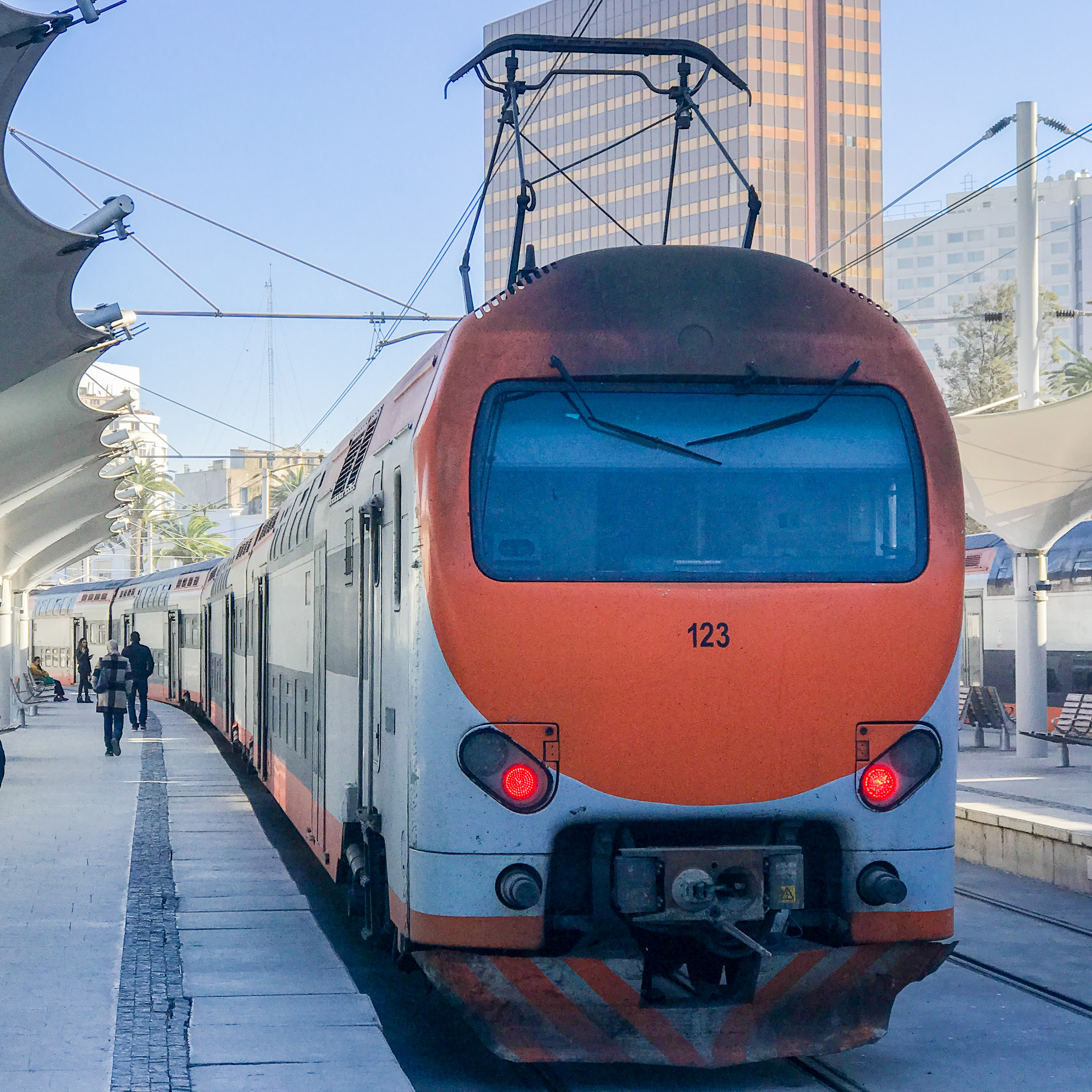
ONCF TAF Z2M
