= Orte railway station =

Railway station in Italy

Orte
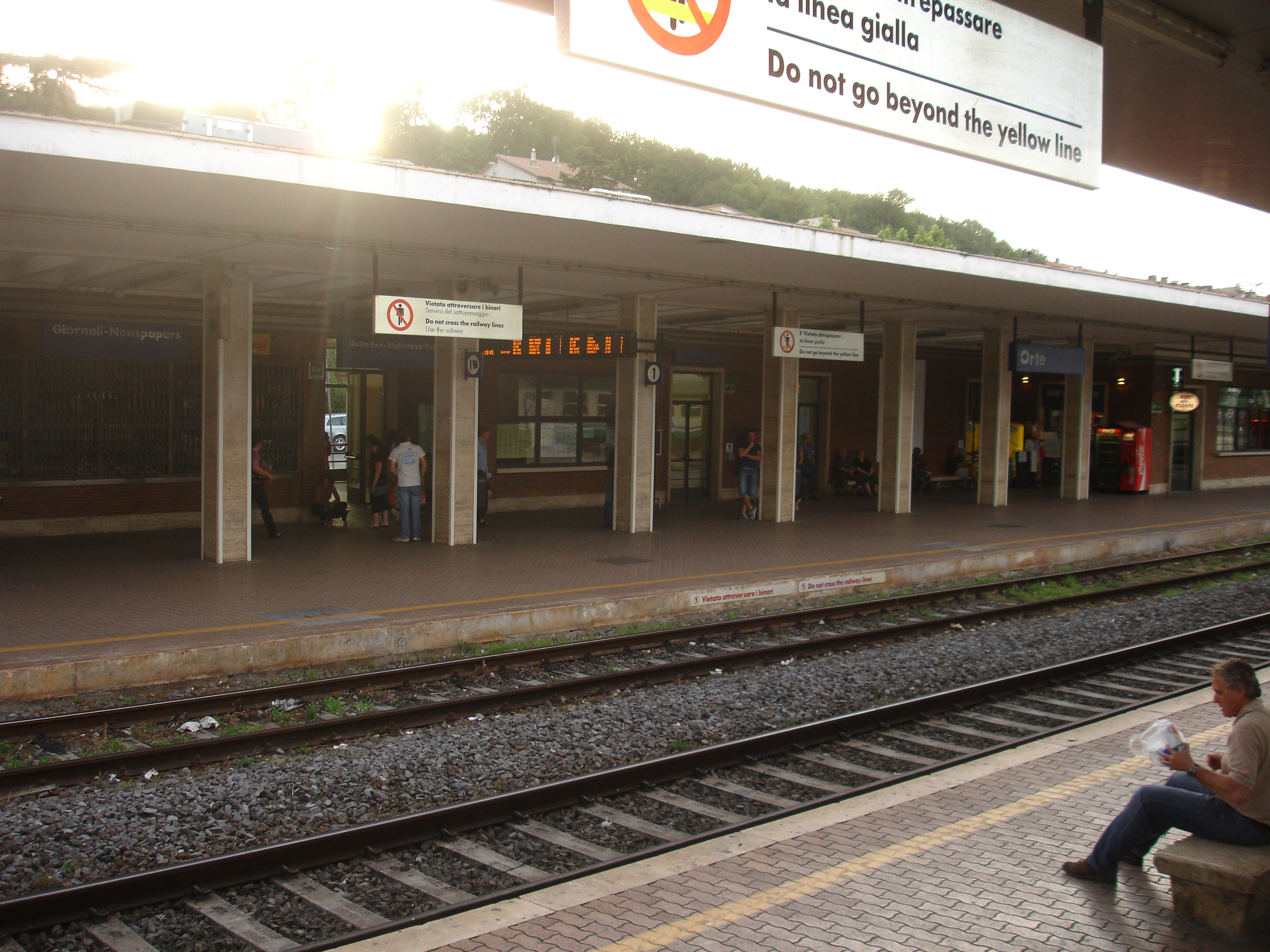

General information
- Location: Piazza Giovanni XXIII 3; 01028 Orte VT; Orte, Viterbo, Lazio; Italy
- Coordinates: 42°26′14″N 12°24′32″E
- Operator: Rete Ferroviaria Italiana; Centostazioni
- Lines: Orte–Fiumicino Aeroporto; Firenze–Roma; Ancona—Orte; Civitavecchia–Orte
- Distance: 82.503 km (51.265 mi) from Roma Termini
- Platforms: 7
- Train operators: Trenitalia
- Connections: Urban buses and suburban buses to Viterbo, Terni, Gallese, Canepina.

Other information
- Classification: Gold

History
- Opened: 1 April 1865; 161 years ago
Location
- Location within Lazio Location within Italy

Orte railway station (Italian: Stazione di Orte) serves the town and comune of Orte, in the region of Lazio, central Italy. Opened in 1865, it forms part of the Florence–Rome railway and the Ancona–Orte railway.

The station is currently managed by Rete Ferroviaria Italiana (RFI). However, the commercial area of the passenger building is managed by Centostazioni. Train services are operated by Trenitalia. Each of these companies is a subsidiary of Ferrovie dello Stato (FS), Italy's state-owned rail company.

== Location ==
Orte railway station is situated in Piazza Giovanni XXIII in the locality of Orte Scalo, approximately two kilometres southeast of the town centre.

== History ==
The station was opened on 1 April 1865, upon the inauguration of the Rome–Orte section of the Rome–Ancona railway. On 4 January 1866, the station ceased to be a terminus, when the line was extended further southeast, as far as Foligno.

Between 1928 and 1961, Orte was the junction for a branch line to Civitavecchia upon which some filming of Von Ryan's Express took place. From then until 1994, that line was operated only between Capranica and Orte. The line is currently disused, but in September 2010 a contract was let for its reconstruction.

== Features ==
The single storey passenger building is made of brick with a colonnade facing the Piazza. It houses a bar, newsstand, ticket office, waiting room and toilets. The station features seven tracks for passenger service, including five through tracks and two terminating tracks. There is also a large goods yard used for the overnight storage of goods trains.

== Passenger and train movements ==
=== Passenger movements ===
The station has about 3.0 million passenger movements each year.

=== Long distance and regional services ===
Some InterCity and Eurostar City trains passing through the station stop there. Frequent regional trains link Orte with nearby destinations, including Rome, Florence, Fiumicino Airport, Foligno, Terontola, Terni, Perugia and Viterbo.

=== Ferrovie regionali del Lazio services ===
The station is also the terminus of the Ferrovie regionali del Lazio FL1 commuter service from Fiumicino Airport.

== See also ==
- History of rail transport in Italy
- List of railway stations in Lazio
- Rail transport in Italy
- Railway stations in Italy

Preceding station	Lazio regional railways	Following station
Terminus	FL1	Gallese in Teverina towards Fiumicino Aeroporto
