= FL7 (Lazio regional railways) =

Roma Termini–Minturno-Scauri
- FL7

Overview
- Status: Operational
- Line number: FL7
- Locale: Rome, Italy
- Termini: Roma Termini; Minturno-Scauri
- Stations: 13
- Colour on map: Chartreuse
- Website: trenitalia.com

Service
- Type: Regional rail
- System: Lazio regional railways
- Operator(s): Trenitalia
- Daily ridership: 40,000

History
- Opened: 1994

Technical
- Line length: 137.4 km (85.4 mi)
- Number of tracks: 2
- Track gauge: 1,435 mm (4 ft 8 1/2 in)
- Electrification: 3,000 V DC
Route map
The Lazio regional railways network.

The FL7 (until 2012 FR7) is a regional rail route. It forms part of the network of the Lazio regional railways (Italian: ferrovie regionali del Lazio), which is operated by Trenitalia, and converges on the city of Rome, Italy.

The route operates over the infrastructure of the Rome–Formia–Naples railway. Within the territory of the comune of Rome, it plays the role of a commuter railway. It is estimated that on average about 40,000 passengers travel on an FR7 train each day.

The designation FL7 appears only in publicity material (e.g. public transport maps), in the official timetables, and on signs at some stations. The electronic destination boards at stations on the FL7 route show only the designation "R" and the relevant train number.

== Route ==
- Roma Termini ↔ Minturno-Scauri

The FL7, a radial route, runs from Roma Termini, on the southern perimeter of Rome's city centre, in a south easterly direction, via the Rome–Formia–Naples railway, to Formia-Gaeta and Minturno-Scauri.

== History ==
When the FL7 was introduced in 1994, it was divided at Campoleone into two branches. One ran to Nettuno, and the other to Formia (which was renamed Formia-Gaeta in 2012).

Since the introduction of the FL7, the Roma–Nettuno services have been reclassified as a separate line, the FL8.

== Stations ==
The stations on the FL7 are as follows:

- Roma Termini LeoExp
- Torricola
- Pomezia-Santa Palomba
- Campoleone
- Cisterna di Latina
- Latina
- Sezze Romano
- Priverno-Fossanova
- Monte San Biagio
- Fondi-Sperlonga
- Itri
- Formia-Gaeta
- Minturno-Scauri

== Scheduling ==
The FL7 route is included in the Trenitalia official timetable M85 Roma–Napoli.

As of 2012, services operated at regular intervals, with extra services at rush hour. However, some services skip some stops (at Torricola, Pomezia-Santa Palomba and Itri). Many services do not terminate/originate at Formia-Gaeta but at other stations, such as Minturno-Scauri, Sessa Aurunca, or Naples.

The full trip between Roma Termini and Formia-Gaeta is 137.4 km (85.4 mi) long, and takes about ninety minutes.

== See also ==
- History of rail transport in Italy
- List of railway stations in Lazio
- Rail transport in Italy
- Transport in Rome
