= Latina railway station =

Railway station in Italy

Latina
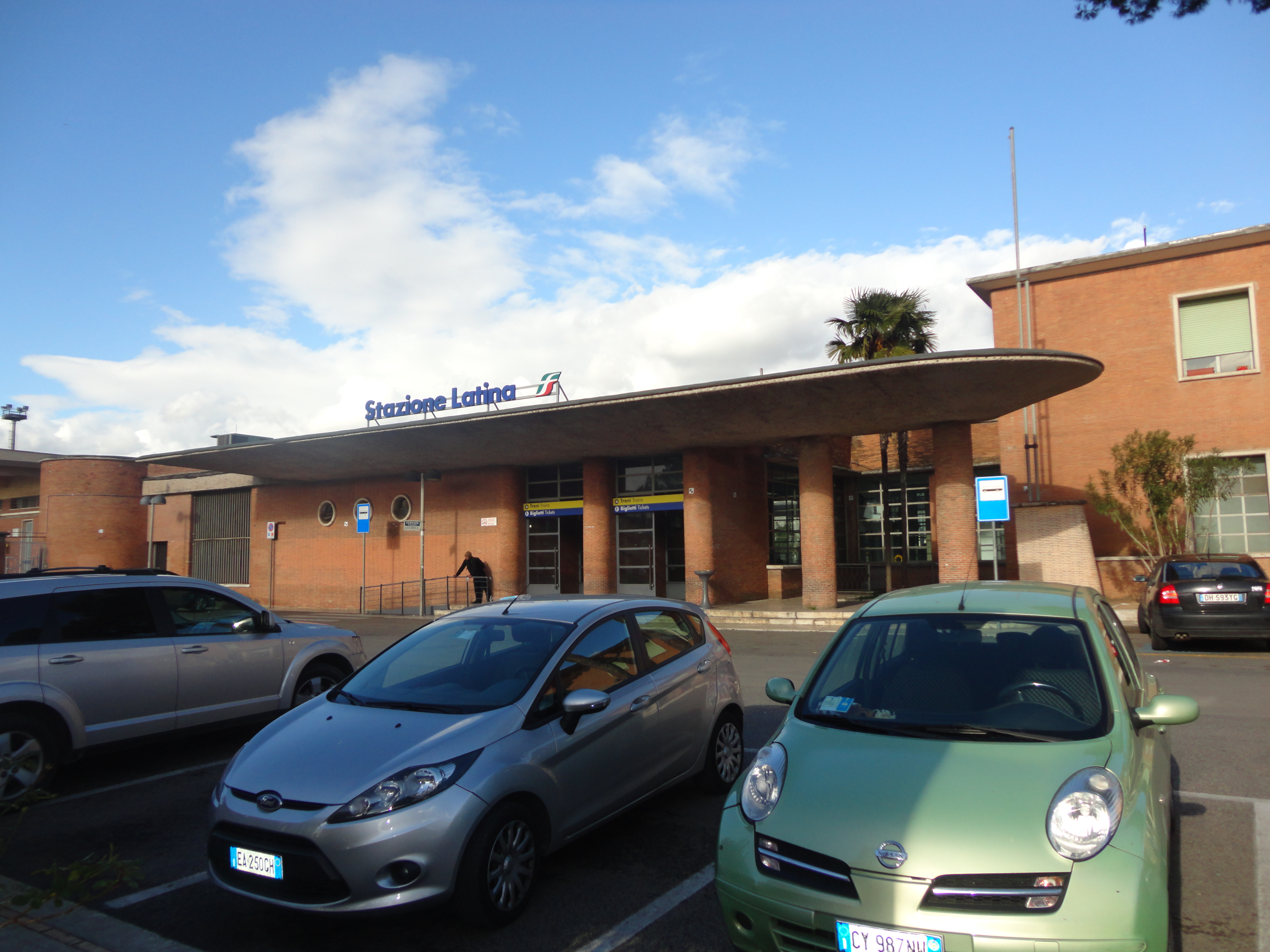

General information
- Location: Piazzale Lelia Caetani, Latina Scalo; 04013 Latina LT; Latina, Latina, Lazio; Italy
- Coordinates: 41°32′17.12″N 12°56′45.8″E
- Operator: Rete Ferroviaria Italiana
- Lines: Rome-Latina-Formia-Naples; Roma Termini-Minturno-Scauri
- Distance: 61.018 km (37.915 mi) from Roma Termini
- Platforms: 2 (3 tracks)
- Train operators: Trenitalia
- Connections: Urban and suburban buses

Other information
- Classification: Silver

History
- Opened: 17 July 1922; 104 years ago
Location
- Location within Lazio Location within Italy

Latina is the main railway station of the Italian city of Latina, in the region of Lazio. It is owned by the Ferrovie dello Stato, the national rail company of Italy, and is an important train station of its region.

== Geography ==
The station is located in Latina Scalo, a suburb in the northern part of Latina. It is the most distant station from the city centre of an Italian seat of province: due to this, 9 km, local and regional authorities have presented several projects to build a rail, or a light rail, from it to an eventual "Latina Città" (i.e. Latina City) station.

== History ==
The station was inaugurated on July 17, 1922, at the opening of the new direct line from Rome to Naples, via Formia. In the early years of service, when the city of Latina didn't exist, it was a simple train stop serving some little villages close to the swamps composing the environment of the Pontine Marshes. In 1932, during fascism and after the foundation of the actual city, the new station of Littoria (original name of Latina, named after the fascio littorio) was enlarged and a new building projected by the architect Angiolo Mazzoni. During this period some diesel multiple unit (DMU) trains were inaugurated in a regional Rome to Littoria service, colloquially named Littorine (plural) and Littorina (singular) after the city. In Italy this colloquial name survives; it is generally used to identify the DMU trains. After the renaming of the city in 1946 also the station took the actual name.

== Train services ==
The station is served by the following services (incomplete):

- Intercity services Rome - Naples - Salerno - Lamezia Terme - Messina - Palermo
- Intercity services Rome - Naples - Salerno - Lamezia Terme - Messina - Siracusa
- Intercity services Rome - Naples - Salerno - Lamezia Terme - Reggio di Calabria
- Intercity services Rome - Naples - Salerno - Taranto
- Intercity services Turin - Genoa - La Spezia - Pisa - Livorno - Rome - Naples - Salerno
- Night train (Intercity Notte) Rome - Naples - Messina - Siracusa
- Night train (Intercity Notte) Turin - Genoa - La Spezia - Pisa - Livorno - Rome - Naples - Salerno
- Regional services (Treno Regionale) Rome - Pomezia - Latina - Formia - Minturno - Naples

== Structure and transport ==
Latina station counts a large one-floor building, located close to the freight shed. It counts 4 tracks for passenger service and 5 terminal tracks, in the northern side, for goods wagons.

The station is electrified and served by regional trains (mainly to Rome, Naples, Formia, and Terracina) and also by the suburban Roman line FR7 part of the Lazio regional railways. Latina has no direct links to some other city stations of its region (as Frosinone, Viterbo, Rieti or Cassino) and is linked to Civitavecchia only with InterCity services.

Located onto one of the principal Italian rail lines, the Rome-Latina-Formia-Naples, it is served for long-distance transport by several InterCity and Express trains to Rome, Turin, Milan, Naples, Venice, Palermo, Syracuse, Reggio Calabria and Bolzano, linking it also with Genoa, Bologna, Florence, Pisa, Verona, Catania, Messina and other cities. As it happens for Formia and Aversa, it is not served by any EuroStar high-speed train.

== See also ==
- Railway stations in Italy
- List of railway stations in Lazio
- Rail transport in Italy
- History of rail transport in Italy
