= FL8 (Lazio regional railways) =

Roma Termini–Nettuno
- FL8

Overview
- Status: Operational
- Line number: FL8
- Locale: Rome, Italy
- Termini: Roma Termini; Nettuno
- Stations: 12
- Colour on map: Light green
- Website: trenitalia.com

Service
- Type: Regional rail
- System: Lazio regional railways
- Operator(s): Trenitalia
- Rolling stock: E.464
- Daily ridership: 40,000

Technical
- Line length: 60 km (37 mi)
- Number of tracks: 2 (Roma–Campoleone); 1 (Campoleone–Nettuno)
- Track gauge: 1,435 mm (4 ft 8 1/2 in)
- Electrification: 3,000 V DC
- Operating speed: 50 km/h (31 mph) (ave)
Route map
The Lazio regional railways network.

The FL8 (until 2012 FR8) is a regional rail route. It forms part of the network of the Lazio regional railways (Italian: ferrovie regionali del Lazio), which is operated by Trenitalia, and converges on the city of Rome, Italy.

The route operates over the infrastructure of the Rome–Formia–Naples and Albano–Nettuno railways. Within the territory of the comune of Rome, it plays the role of a commuter railway, but this section of the route has only two stations, Roma Termini and Torricola. It is estimated that on average about 40,000 passengers travel on an FL8 train each day.

The designation FL8 appears only in publicity material (e.g. public transport maps), in the official timetables, and on signs at some stations. The electronic destination boards at stations on the FL8 route show only the designation "R" and the relevant train number.

== Route ==
- Roma Termini ↔ Nettuno

The FL8, a radial route, runs from Roma Termini, on the southern perimeter of Rome's city centre, in a south easterly direction, via the Rome–Formia–Naples railway, to Campoleone, and then south west, via the Albano–Nettuno railway, to Nettuno.

On the main line between Roma Termini and Campoleone, the route is double track, and on the branch line between Campoleone and Nettuno, the route is single track.

== History ==
When the Lazio regional railways network was introduced in 1994, the route of the present day FL8 was part of the FL7, which was divided at Campoleone into two branches. One FL7 branch ran to Nettuno, and the other to Formia (renamed Formia-Gaeta in 2012).

Since the introduction of the FL7, the Roma–Nettuno services have been reclassified as FL8 services.

== Stations ==
The stations on the FL8 are as follows:

- Roma Termini LeoExp
- Torricola
- Pomezia-Santa Palomba
- Campoleone
- Aprilia
- Campo di Carne
- Padiglione
- Lido di Lavinio
- Villa Claudia
- Marechiaro
- Anzio Colonia
- Anzio
- Nettuno

== Rolling stock ==
Double-decker trains are used on the FL8, including the Vivalto, which replaced the TAF in early 2006.

== Scheduling ==
The FL8 route is included in the Trenitalia official timetable M75 Roma–Campoleone–Nettuno.

As of 2012, trains leave hourly, except in rush hour, when there is at least one extra departure.

Journey times to the capital from Nettuno vary depending on the time of day: on average, the journey takes 70 minutes.

== See also ==
- History of rail transport in Italy
- List of railway stations in Lazio
- Rail transport in Italy
- Transport in Rome
