= Jazz (Italian EMU) =

Italian electric multiple unit

ETR 324 – ETR 425 – ETR 526 "Jazz"
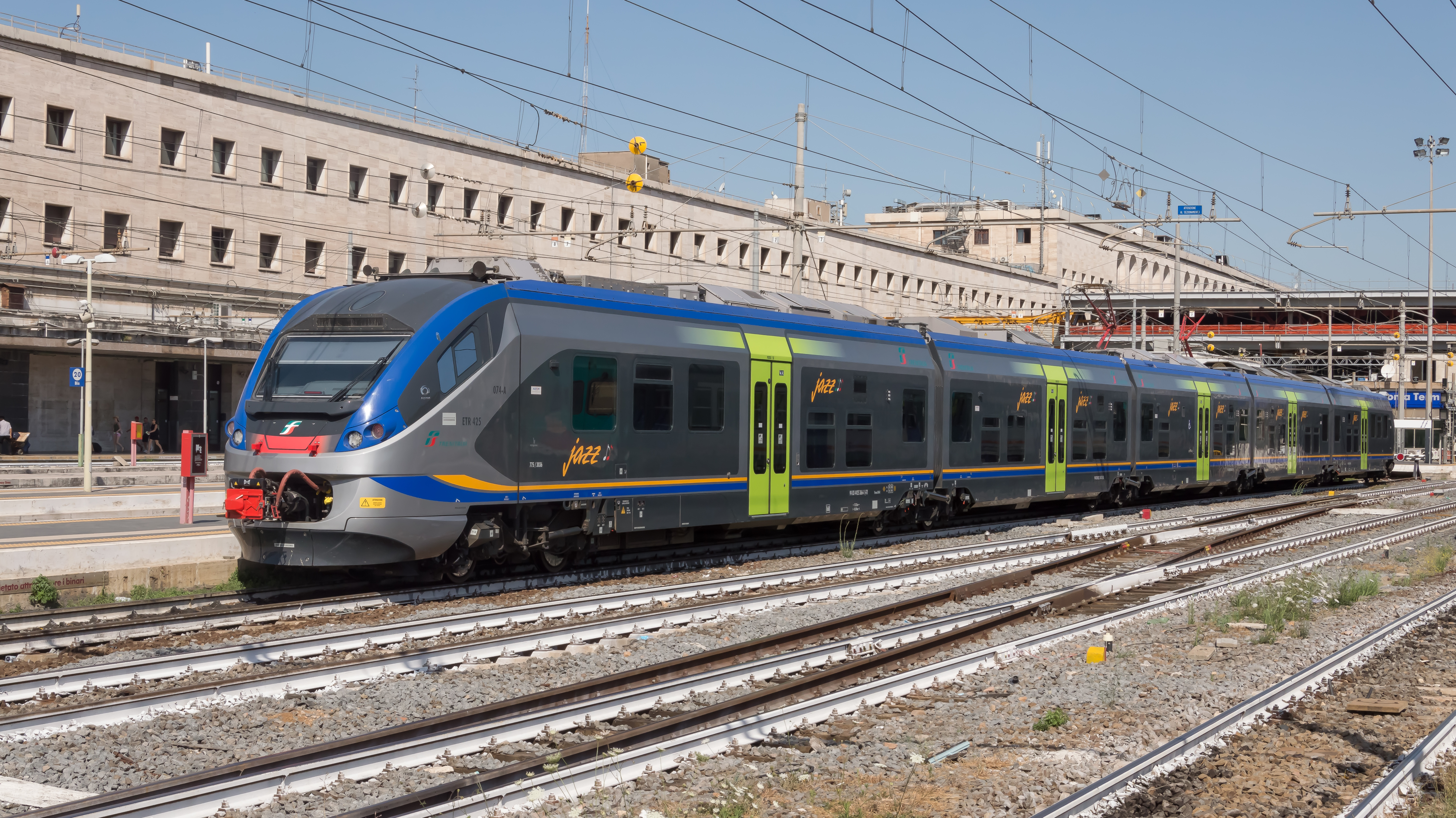
- A Trenitalia Jazz (ETR 425)
Type and origin
- Power type: Electric
- Builder: Alstom
- Build date: From 2014
- Total produced: 100
Specifications
- Gauge: 1,435 mm (4 ft 8 1/2 in) standard gauge
- Length: 67.55 m (221 ft 7 1/2 in) ETR 324; 82.20 m (269 ft 8 1/4 in) ETR 425 92.85 m (304 ft 7 1/2 in) ETR 526
- Width: 2.95 m (9 ft 8 1/8 in)
- Height: 3.82 m (12 ft 6 3/8 in)
- Electric system/s: 3000 V DC Overhead
- Current pickup(s): Pantograph
Performance figures
- Maximum speed: 160 km/h (99 mph)
Career
- Operators: Trenitalia, Ferrovienord
- Nicknames: Jazz
- First run: 2014
- Current owner: Trenitalia, Ferrovienord
- Disposition: In service

ETR 324, ETR 425 and ETR 526 "Jazz" are Italian electric multiple units (EMU) used mainly for commuter regional trains.

== History ==
In 2012, the Italian state railroad placed a €440 million order with Alstom for 70 Coradia Meridian trains, which would be known to Trenitalia as "Jazz." Alstom began delivering the trains in 2014. Trenitalia exercised a €170 million option to order 27 additional trains in 2015.

The trains were assembled in multiple configurations to vary amounts of standing room, total passenger capacity, and luggage space. They were fitted with video surveillance, information screens, loudspeakers, and charging ports. Alstom manufactured the trains in Savigliano, Sesto San Giovanni, and Bologna.

== Versions ==
There are three different versions:

- Four coach version (ETR 324);
- Five coach version (ETR 425);
- Six coach version (ETR 526);

=== Five-coaches version: ETR 425 ===
==== Leonardo Express ====
All cars are first class.

== Gallery ==
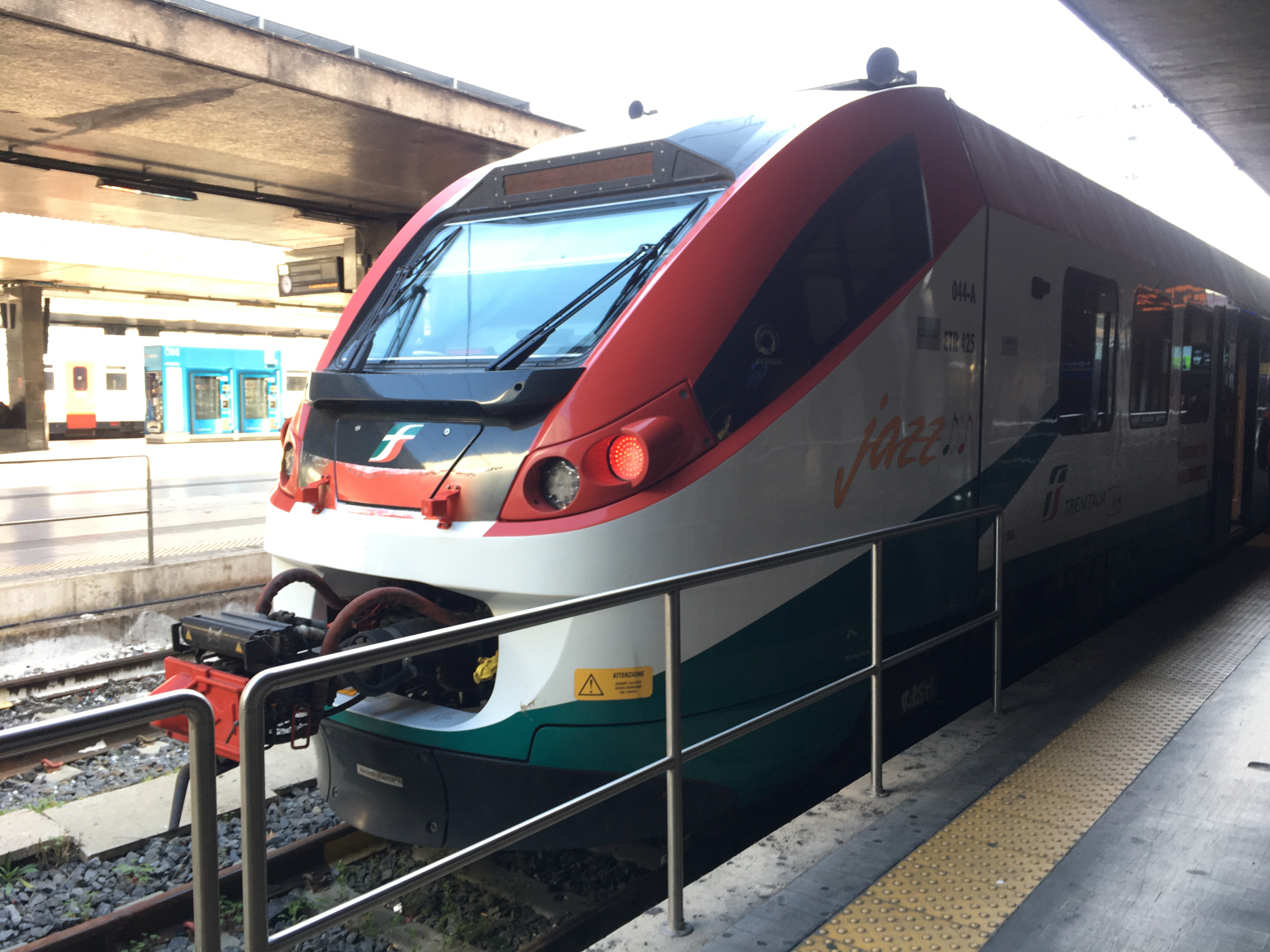
A Leonardo Express train at Roma Termini

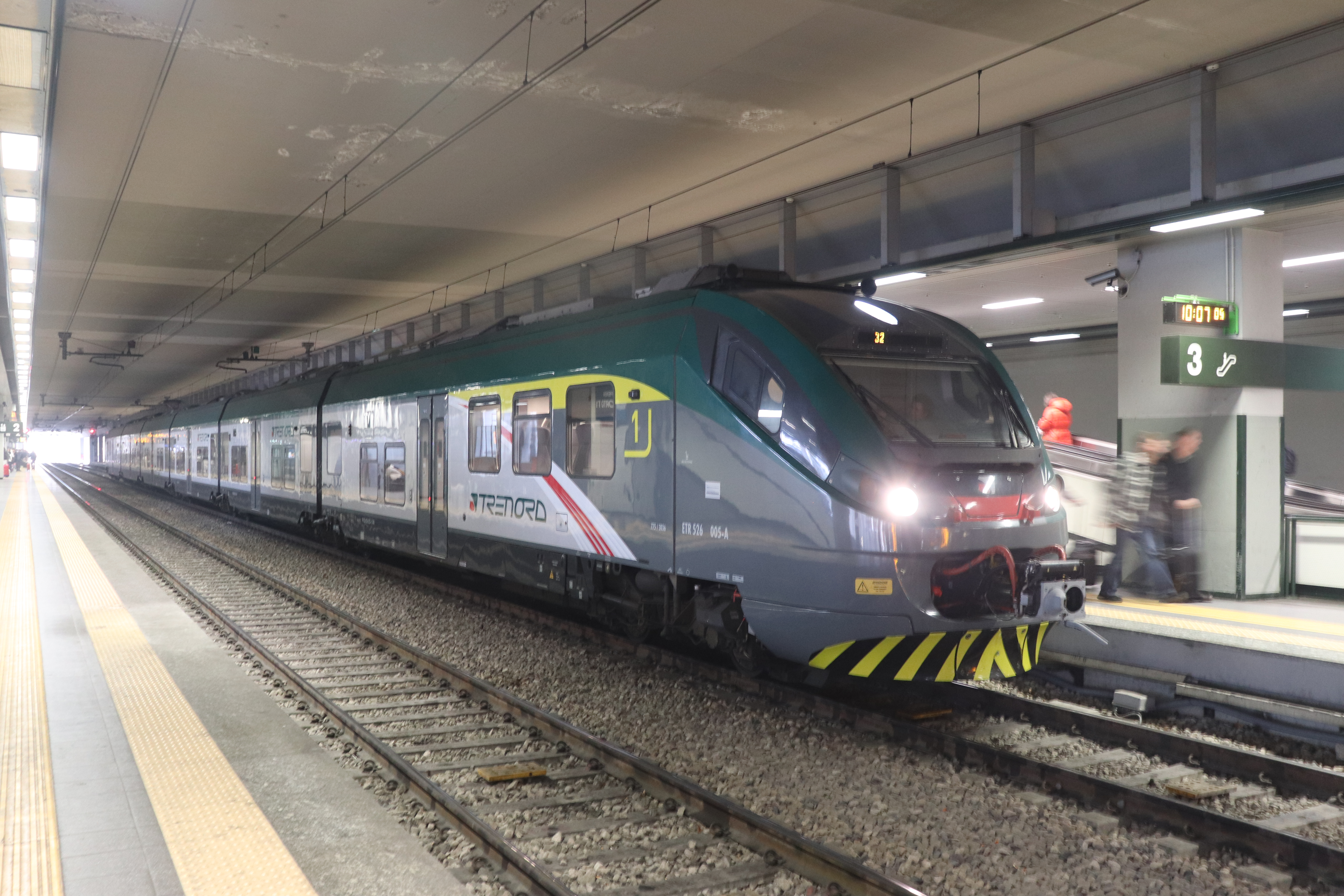
A Jazz train at Milan Malpensa Airport in Trenord livery

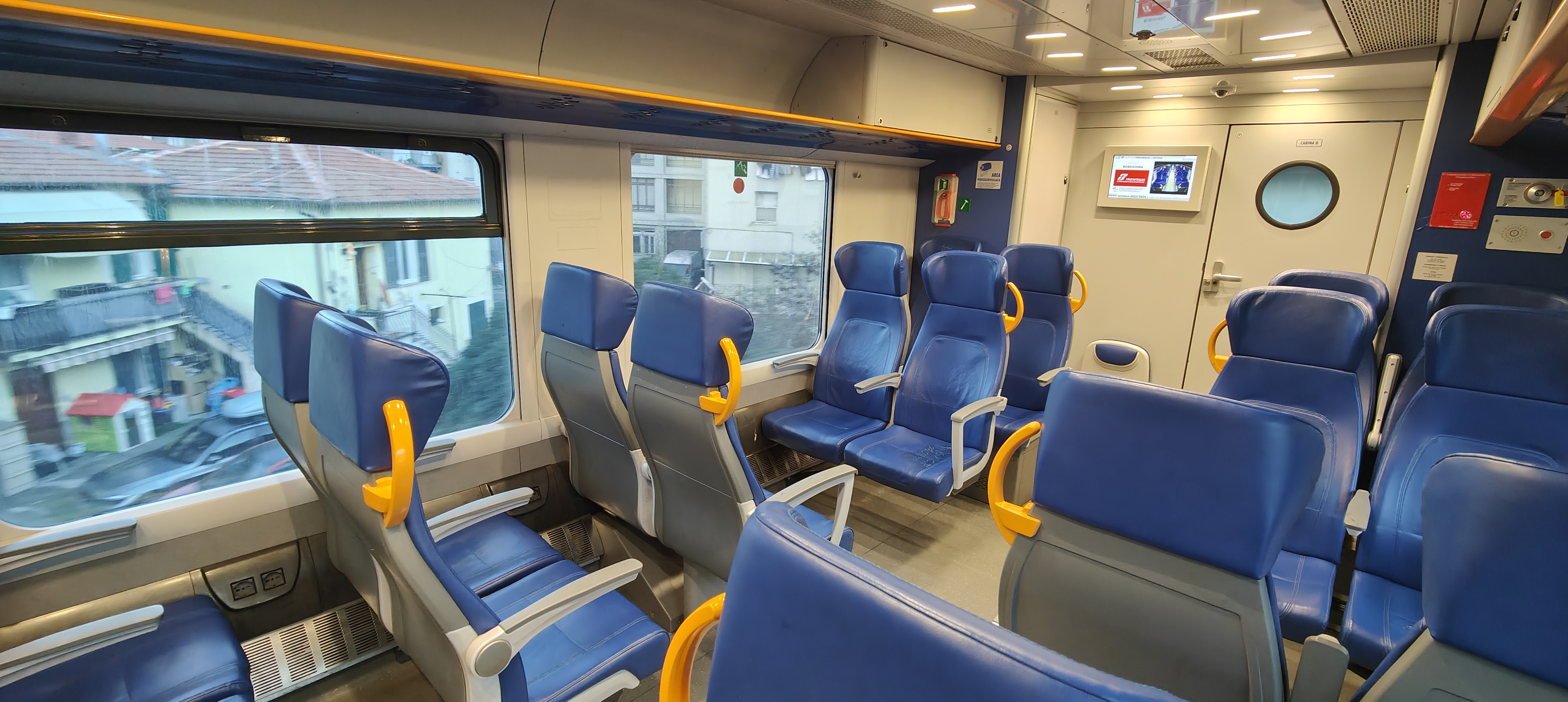
The interior configuration of a Jazz train

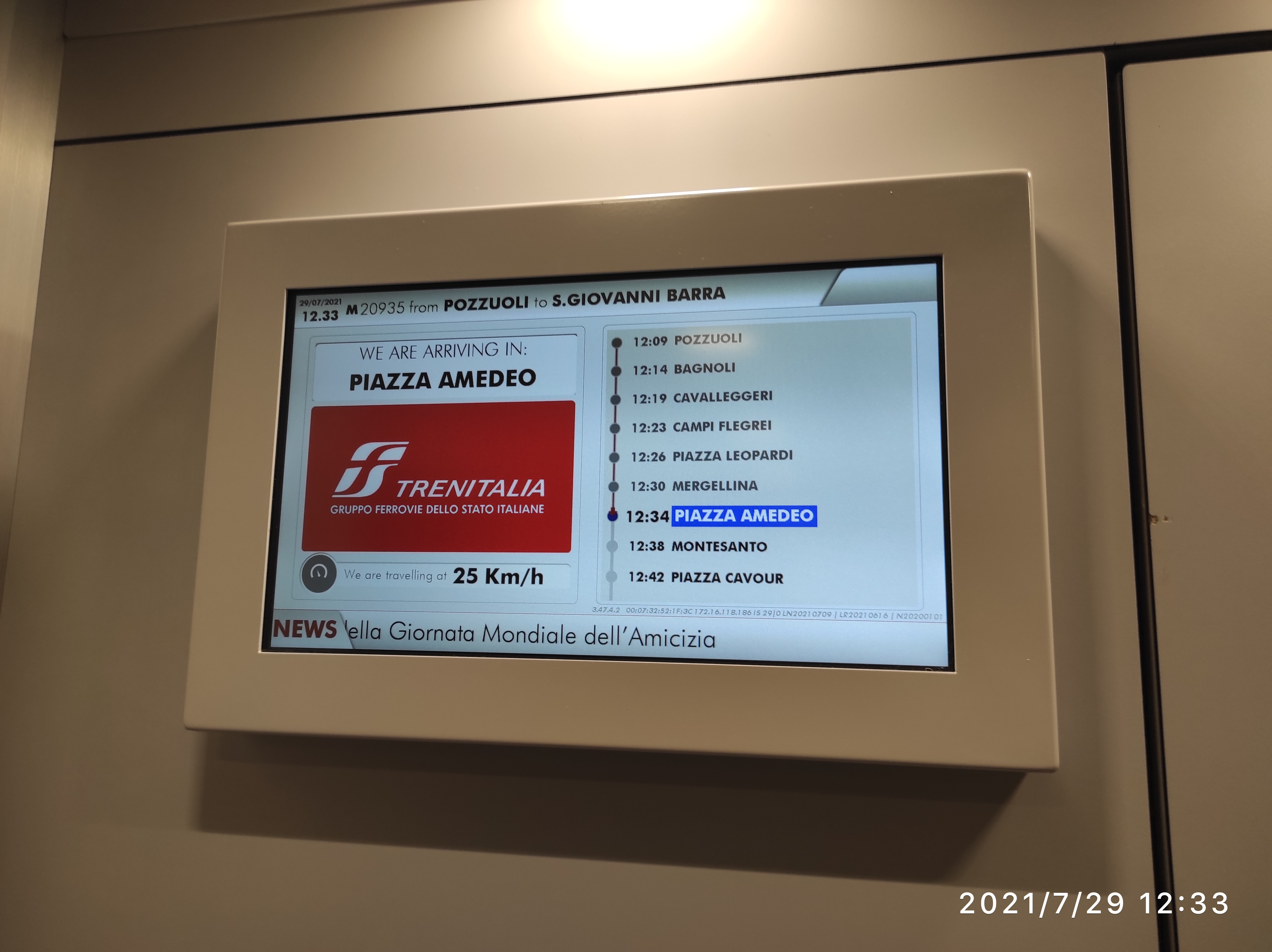
A passenger information screen

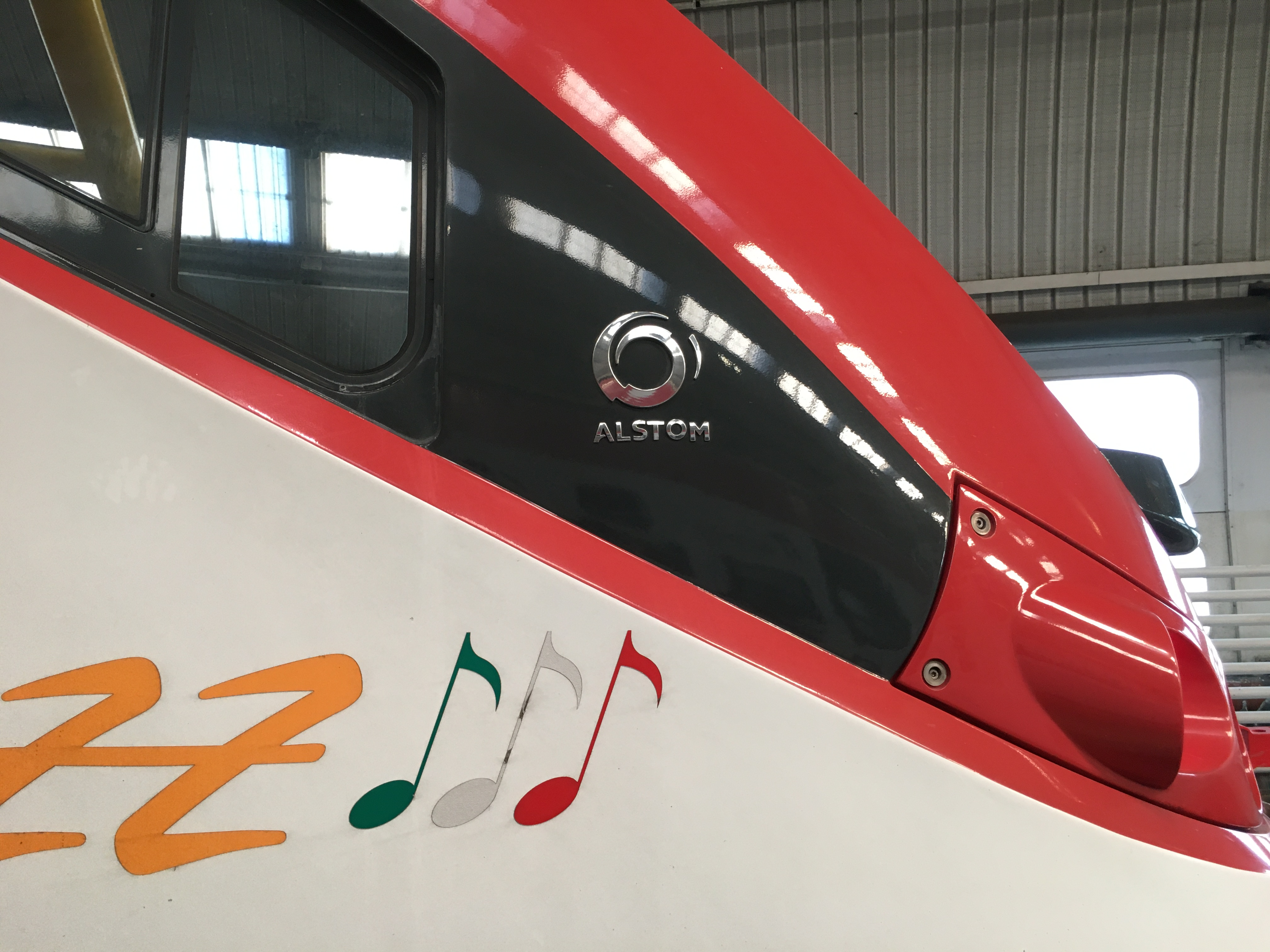
The Alstom logo on a train
