= Rome–Frascati railway =

Railway line in Italy

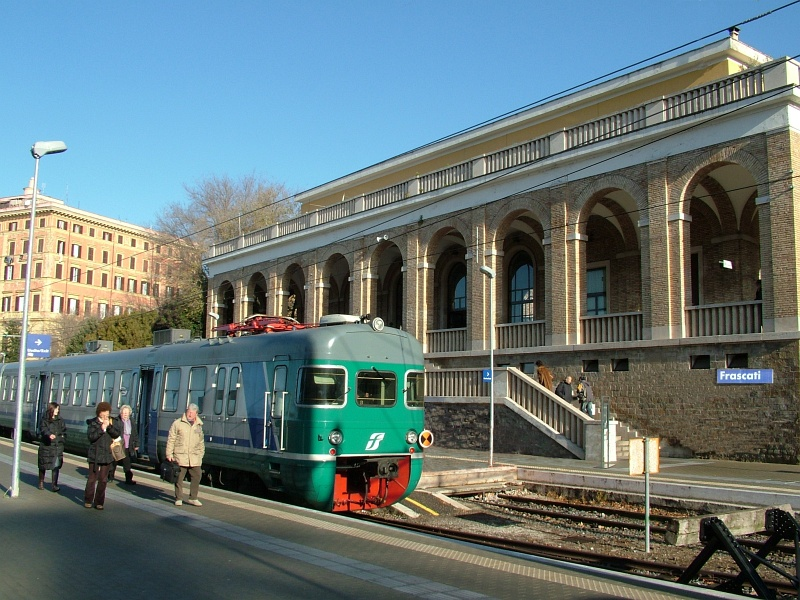
- A view from the platform at Frascati

Overview
- Status: Operational
- Owner: RFI
- Line number: 116
- Locale: Italy
- Termini: Roma Termini; Frascati

Service
- Type: Heavy rail
- Operator(s): Trenitalia

History
- Opened: 1856

Technical
- Line length: 24 km (15 mi)
- Track gauge: 1,435 mm (4 ft 8 1/2 in)
- Electrification: 3000 V DC
Route map
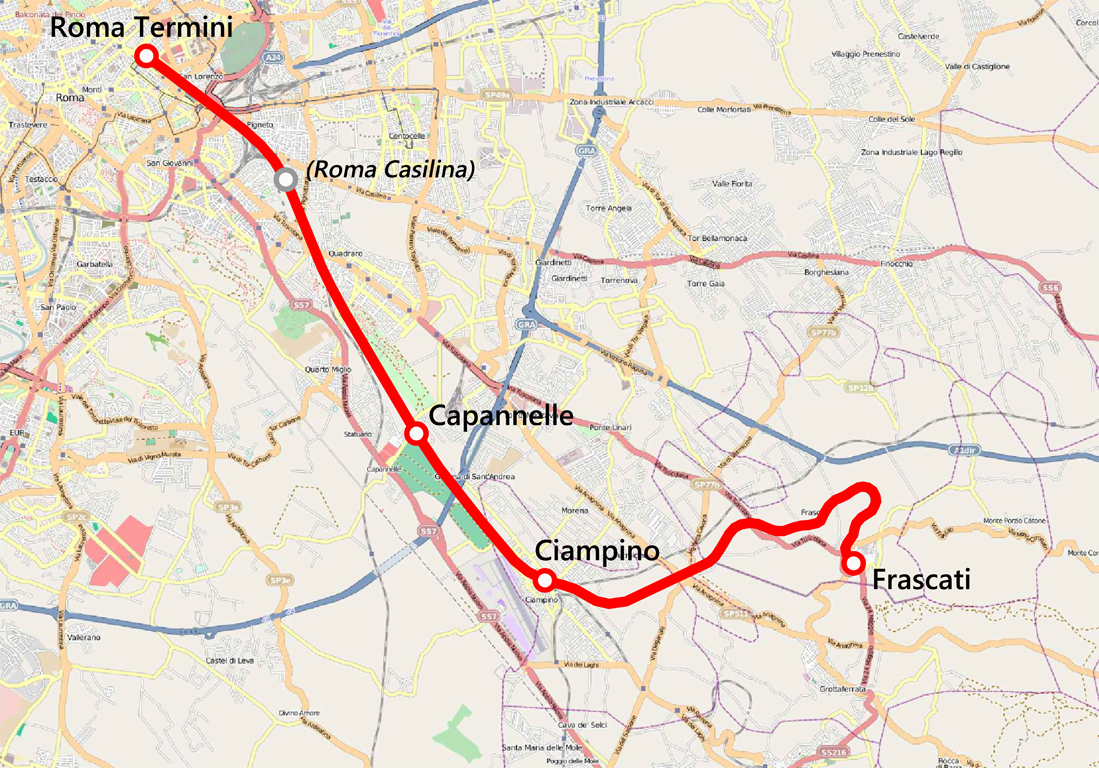
First line of the Papal States
- Source: Italian railway atlas

The Rome–Frascati railway line is one of the oldest railways in Italy. It was the first railway in the Papal States, opening in 1856, with a length of 20 km.

== History ==
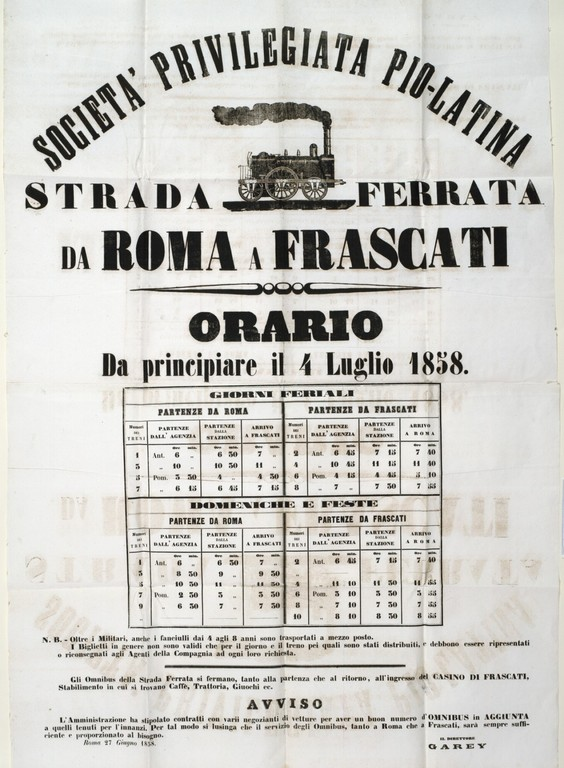
Timetable of the Rome-Frascati line of the Società Pia-Latina, divided into weekdays, Sundays and holidays, 1858

On 25 November 1848, the agreement to build the railway was signed between the Government and the Società Pia-Latina ("Pius Latina Company"). During the next eight years, the railway was built with two stations, Porta Maggiore station in Rome and Frascati station in Campitelli, 3 km from the centre of Frascati, and a tunnel. This line was built by Impresa York & Co., owned by John Oliver York, a building contractor and designer, and 180 workers were engaged.

The line was opened for service on 14 July 1856, (Note: Another source says 12 October 1857.) five trips a day, three in the morning and two in the afternoon, with a 28 minute traveling time. The railway was equipped with six English-built steam locomotives (Sharp Stewart and William Bridges Adams) and six carriages. The four main locomotives were named after the Saints Pio, Pietro, Paolo and Giovanni, names chosen by Pope Pius IX in a letter addressed to the administrator of the York & Co Company dated 7 June 1856.

After the initial enthusiasm, the distance of the stations from the respective urban centres, located in open country, made it impractical to transport wine and oil from Frascati (with 5,300 inhabitants) to Rome (with 160,000 inhabitants) and continued to prefer to use the old carts, while passengers continued to use the stagecoaches that ran from the centre of Rome to the centre of Frascati. Pasquino did not miss the opportunity to make fun of the new railway by writing that the line "did not start from Rome and did not arrive in Frascati". To attract tourists, the York company built a building in Frascati, connected to Campitelli station, for concerts, receptions and a small theatre, but the initiative was unsuccessful and was abandoned.

The new Termini Station in Rome was opened in 1874 and Porta Maggiore station was demolished in 1893. In 1881 the railway began construction on the last section from Campitelli resort to the town centre. The last section of the railway line and the new Frascati Station was inaugurated and opened for service on 2 February 1884, managed by Società per le Strade Ferrate Romane.

Map of the Ciampino railway junction after the opening of the new station on a deviation in 1892

In 1943 the Frascati Station was destroyed (Frascati bombing raid September 8, 1943). In 1944 the rail tunnel was used by the Wehrmacht (German army) to hide the heavy rail gun (280 mm) used to defend against the Allied landings in the area of Anzio.

In 1945, railway services on the Rome-Frascati line resumed regular operations. There were two intermediate stops between Ciampino and Frascati, both now closed: Galleria di Ciampino (Ciampino tunnel) and Valle Vermiglia. The line, originally managed with the Dirigente Unico system (a form of train order operation) and with absolute block signalling, saw at the beginning of the nineties the complete automation of level crossings and the abolition of these signalling systems.

Frascati station was downgraded to a halt and the train service—unlike the Albano Laziale and Velletri lines, which were remotely controlled by the Ciampino signalling centre until May 2013 and then directly from Roma Termini—is operated as a shuttle. At the end of the 1990s, track 1 of Frascati station was replaced by a concrete path and since then only one track has been available for operations.

Work began in 2011 on removing the concrete layer from track 1 and installing shelters on its platform in order to return it to service.

=== Timeline ===
- 1848 - 1856 Line and two stations constructed
- 1874 New Termini Station in Rome was opened for service
- 1881 - 1884 Last railroad section constructed
- 1884 Railway opened for service from Frascati city centre to Termini Station in Rome
- 1943 Frascati Station destroyed
- 1945 Frascati Station was opened again for service

== The route today ==
As of 2006, the track and infrastructure are managed by Rete Ferroviaria Italiana while the train and the passenger operation is managed by Trenitalia. The stations connected by the railway are: Frascati, Ciampino, Capannelle, Roma Termini. The rolling stock in operation is vintage and the route is scenic, it passes through vineyards and olive groves. There is an hourly service during weekdays, while on Sundays trains run every two hours.
