= Formia–Gaeta railway station =

Railway station in Italy

Formia–Gaeta
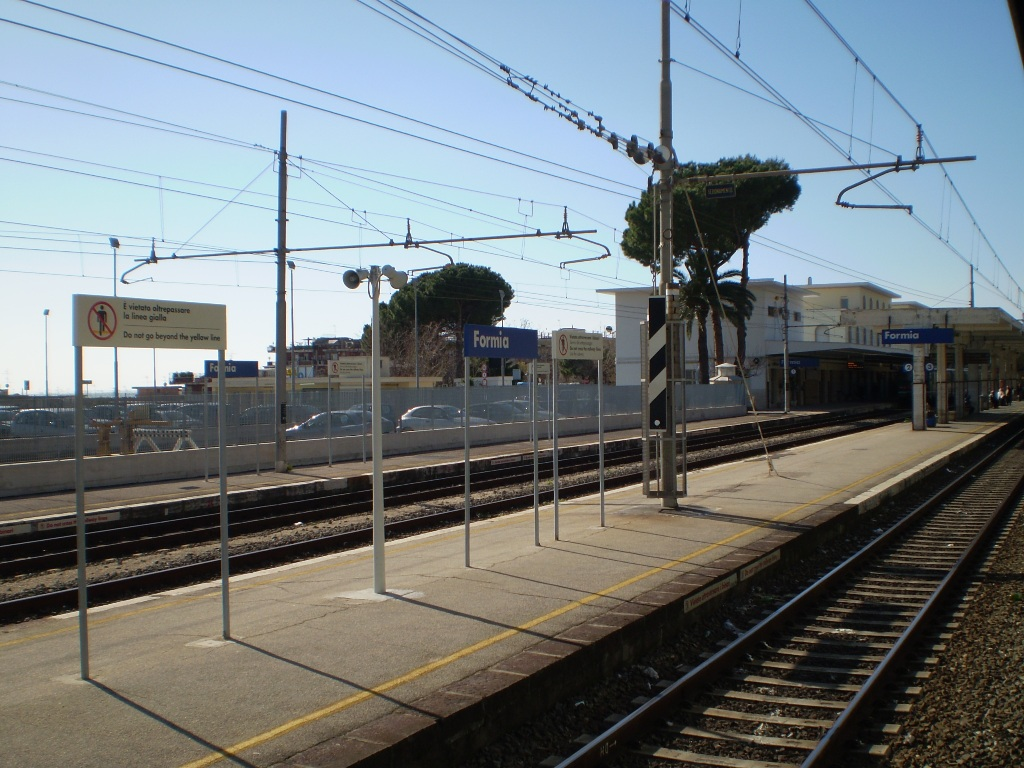
- Formia-Gaeta railway station

General information
- Location: Piazza 4 Novembre 040423, Formia, Province of Latina, Lazio; Italy
- Coordinates: 41°15′31″N 13°36′21″E
- Owner: Rete Ferroviaria Italiana
- Operator: Trenitalia
- Lines: Rome–Latina–Formia–Naples; Roma Termini–Minturno–Scauri
- Distance: 128.423 km (79.798 mi) from Roma Termini

Other information
- Classification: Gold

History
- Opened: 4 May 1892; 134 years ago
- parking tickets pedestrian underpass cafeteria WC public transportation
Location
- Location within Lazio Location within Italy

Formia–Gaeta railway station (Italian: Stazione di Formia–Gaeta), previously named Formia railway station (Italian: Stazione di Formia), serves the cities and comunes of Formia and Gaeta, in the region of Lazio, central Italy.

Opened in 1892, the station presently forms part of the Rome–Formia–Naples railway, which was completed in 1927. Previously, and originally, the station was part of the now abandoned Sparanise–Gaeta railway, the Formia–Gaeta section of which is currently in the process of being reconstructed.

All trains passing through the station are defined as being via Formia, to distinguish them from trains operating on the older and slower Rome–Naples railway via Cassino.

The station is currently managed by Rete Ferroviaria Italiana (RFI). However, the commercial area of the passenger building is managed by Centostazioni. Train services are operated by Trenitalia. Each of these companies is a subsidiary of Ferrovie dello Stato Italiane (FS), Italy's state-owned rail company.

== Location ==
Formia-Gaeta railway station is situated at Piazza 4 Novembre on the north side of the city centre.

== History ==
The station was opened on 4 May 1892 upon the inauguration of the Sparanise–Gaeta railway. It was named Formia and was composed initially of two passenger tracks and a small goods yard.

The construction of the Rome–Formia–Naples railway in the 1920s positively changed the destiny of the station and negatively affected the Sparanise–Gaeta line. For an initial period, the Formia–Sparanise section of the latter line was used by trains to Rome because the direct route was not yet finished. Upon the completion of the new line, traffic was diverted to that line, and the numbers of travellers on the Formia–Sparanise section dropped dramatically.

Even so, the opening of the Naples–Formia–Rome railway in 1927 transformed the station into an important rail junction. For that reason, it was fitted with additional platforms and greatly expanded. In order to offer a better service on the Sparanise–Gaeta line, two types of trains were created for that line: first, a group of trains travelling along the Formia–Sparanise section, and secondly, a shuttle service between Formia and Gaeta.

In 1957, the Sparanise–Formia section of the Sparanise–Gaeta line was closed. The more popular passenger services between Formia and Gaeta resisted closure until 1966. A moderate goods service continued on that section until the Sparanise–Gaeta line was wholly abandoned in 1981. The Formia–Gaeta section is currently in the process of being reconstructed.

On 10 June 2012, the station was renamed from Formia to Formia-Gaeta.

== Train services ==
The station is served by the following services (incomplete):

- Intercity services Rome - Naples - Salerno - Lamezia Terme - Messina - Palermo
- Intercity services Rome - Naples - Salerno - Lamezia Terme - Messina - Siracusa
- Intercity services Rome - Naples - Salerno - Lamezia Terme - Reggio di Calabria
- Intercity services Rome - Naples - Salerno - Taranto
- Intercity services Turin - Genoa - La Spezia - Pisa - Livorno - Rome - Naples - Salerno
- Night train (Intercity Notte) Rome - Naples - Messina - Siracusa
- Night train (Intercity Notte) Turin - Genoa - La Spezia - Pisa - Livorno - Rome - Naples - Salerno
- Regional services (Treno Regionale) Rome - Pomezia - Latina - Formia - Minturno - Naples

== Features ==
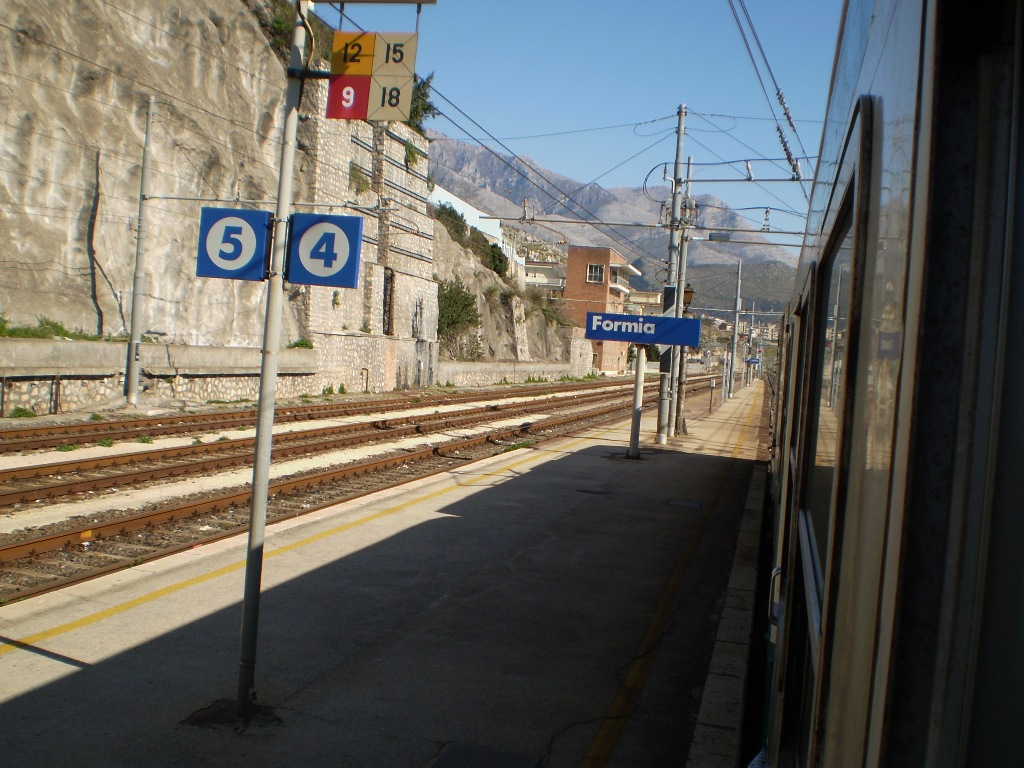
View from a passing train

Formia's passenger building is a large structure made up of several conjoined sections, ranging from one to three storeys in height. The ground floor level of the central section is faced with marble and has five arched entrances. The upper levels of that section, and the other sections, are painted an off white colour.

Inside the passenger building, at ground level, are a ticketing office, waiting room, bar, restaurant, and luggage facilities. The upper floors are used for Trenitalia offices.

The station has five through tracks faced by platforms fitted with shelters and subways for passenger service, plus a platform dock once used for a shuttle service between Formia and Gaeta.

There is also a goods yard and warehouse but relatively little goods traffic.

== Passenger and train movements ==
The station has about 2.5 million passenger movements each year.

All InterCity trains passing through the station stop there, but Eurostar Italia trains do not. Regional trains link Formia with other destinations in Lazio, including Rome, and with destinations in Campania, including Naples and Salerno.

== See also ==
- History of rail transport in Italy
- List of railway stations in Lazio
- Rail transport in Italy
- Railway stations in Italy
- Latina railway station
