= Leonardo Express =

Airport rail service in Italy

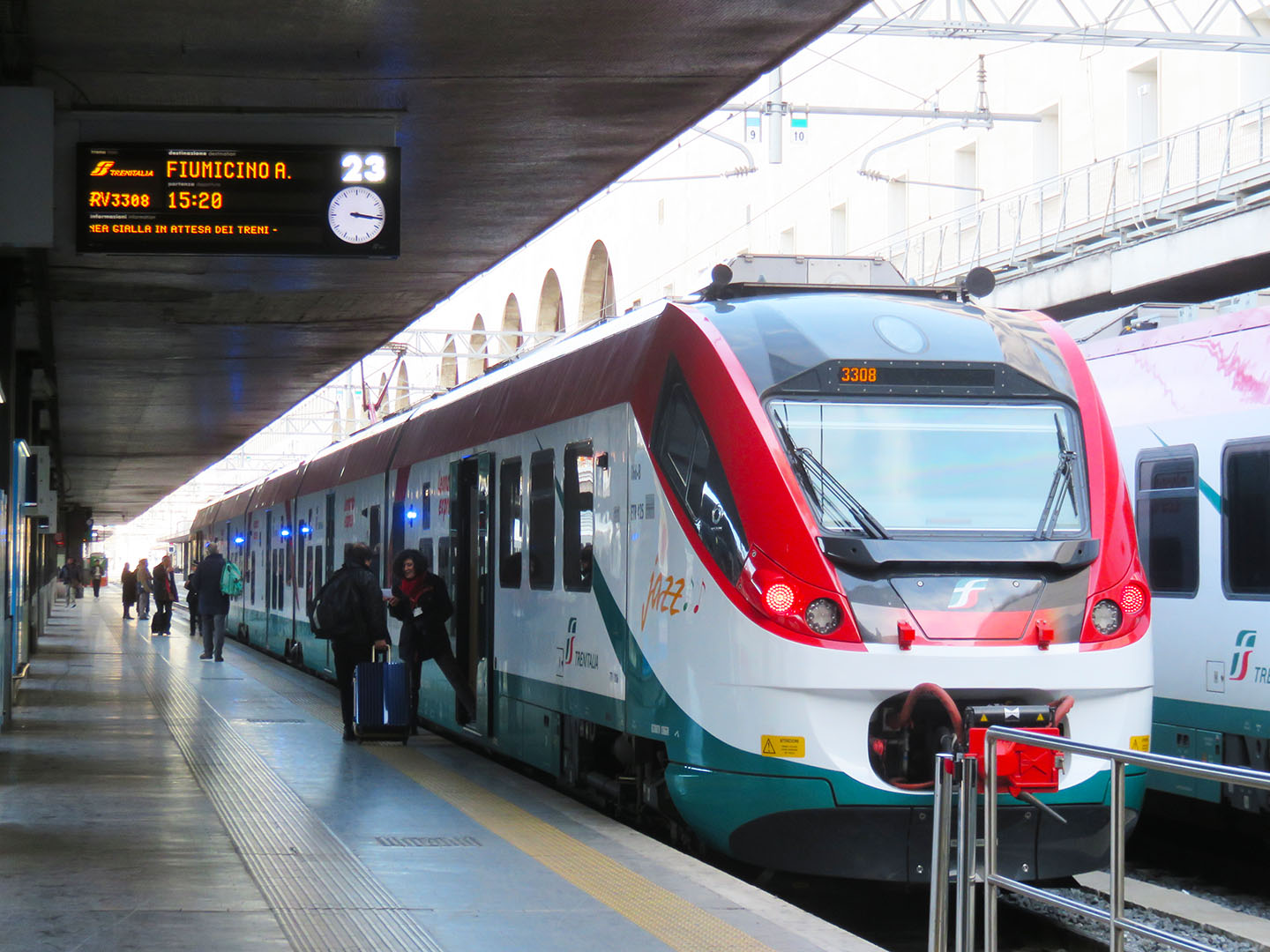
- ETR 425 Leonardo Express at Roma Termini (Feb 2017)

Overview
- Service type: Airport rail link
- Status: Operating
- Locale: Lazio; Italy
- First service: February 2000
- Current operator: Trenitalia
- Website: trenitalia.com

Route
- Termini: Roma Termini; Fiumicino Aeroporto
- Stops: Non stop
- Average journey time: 32 minutes
- Service frequency: 4 per hour

Technical
- Rolling stock: ETR-425
- Track gauge: 1,435 mm (4 ft 8 1/2 in)
- Electrification: 3 kV DC
- Track owner: Ferrovie dello Stato

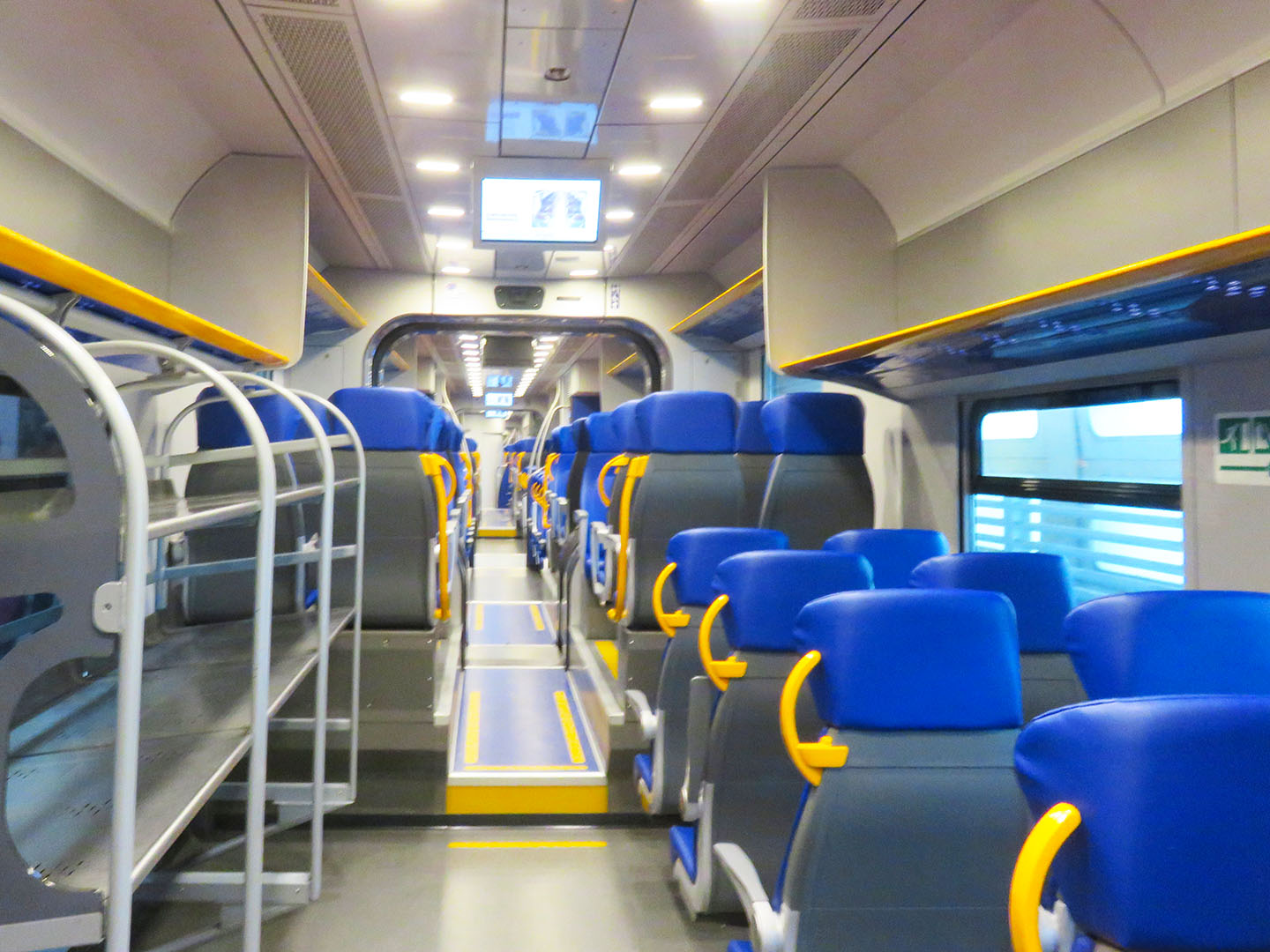
Interior of the train

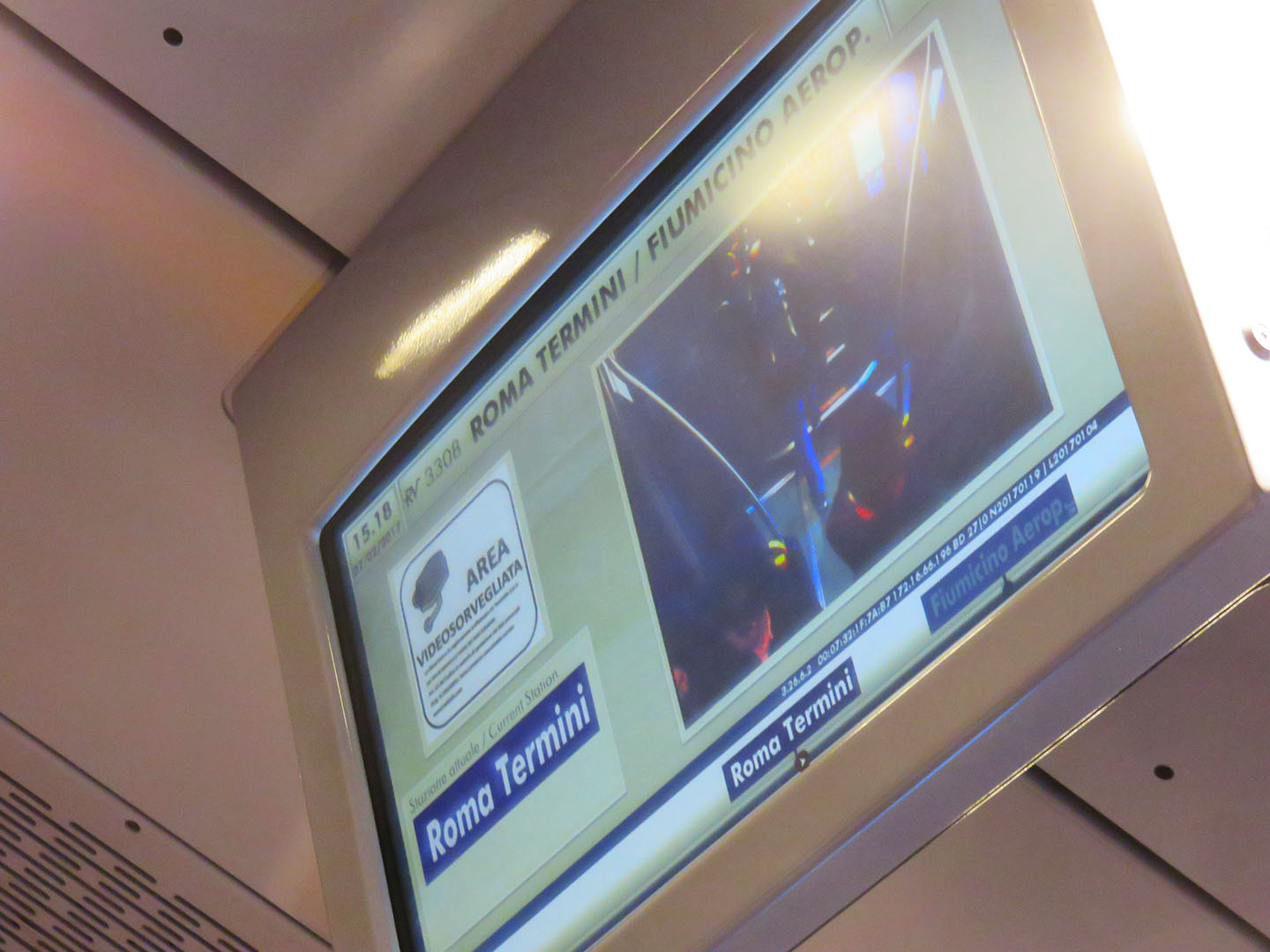
LCD

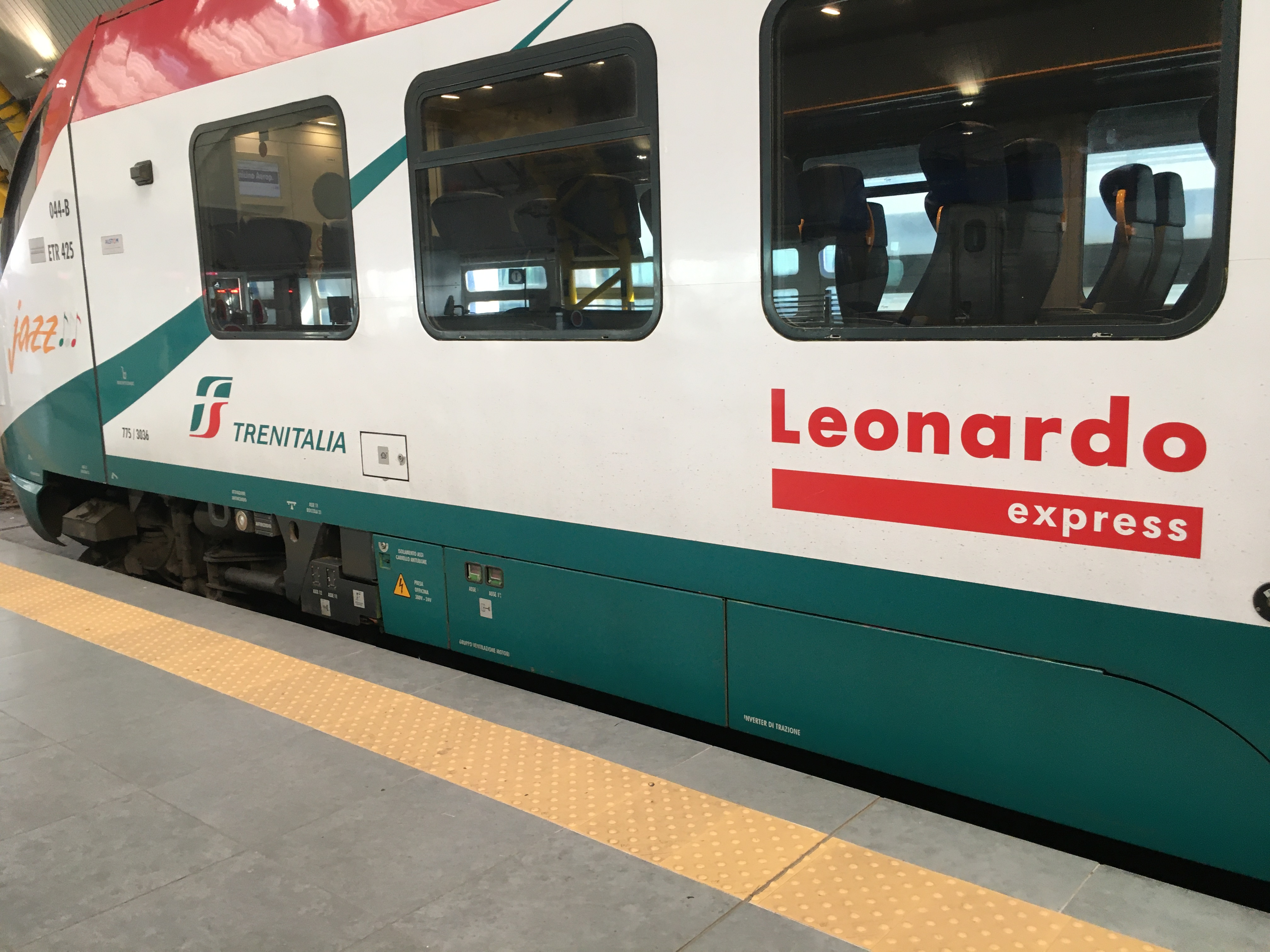
The logo of Leonardo express

The Leonardo Express is an airport rail service linking the center of Rome with its largest airport, Leonardo da Vinci-Fiumicino Airport, in the region of Lazio, central Italy.

== Service ==
The service is operated by Trenitalia, and takes 32 minutes to travel the 37 kilometres (23 mi) between its two stops.

The service opened in December 1989.

Leonardo Express operates every 15 minutes, in some time slots the frequencies rise up to 30 minutes per train. The train station Fiumicino Aeroporto is located inside the airport and is easily accessible.

In 2023, Trenitalia announced in collaboration with Fiumicino's operator Aeroporti di Roma and ITA Airways that they planned to offer a combined rail-air ticket that would also allow passengers to check their bags for air travel at Fiumicino station.

== Rolling stock ==
The service is entirely operated by ETR 425 "Jazz" EMU convoys in airport livery, essentially composed of white, red and green, which recall the Italian tricolour. These trains have been in service on the line since July 2015.

== See also ==
- Transport in Rome
- Rome Metro
- FL lines
- Transport in Italy
- History of rail transport in Italy
- Rail transport in Italy
