= FL lines =

Railway lines in Lazio

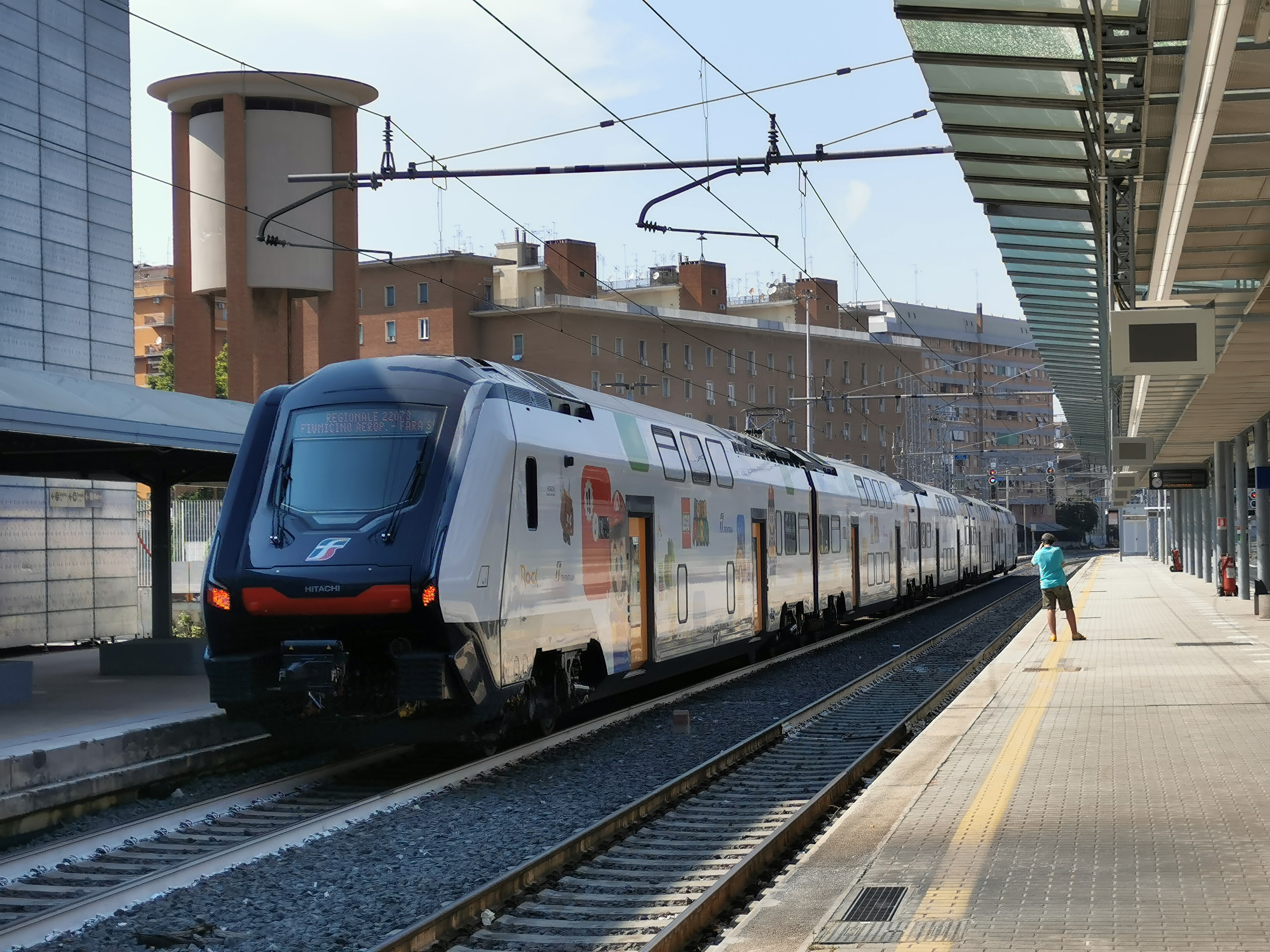
- ETR Rock on the FL1 line departing from Roma Tiburtina

Overview
- Area served: Rome metropolitan area, Lazio
- Locale: Rome, Lazio
- Transit type: Commuter rail
- Number of lines: 8
- Number of stations: 131
- Daily ridership: 286,241
- Website: trenitalia.com

Operation
- Began operation: 1994
- Operator: Trenitalia
- Infrastructure manager: Rete Ferroviaria Italiana
- Rolling stock: E.464, TAF, Jazz, ETR 421/521/621 Rock

Technical
- System length: 672 km (417.6 mi)
- Track gauge: 1,435 mm (4 ft 8 1/2 in) standard gauge
- Electrification: 3 kV DC, overhead line
System map

The FL lines, formerly Lazio regional railways (Italian: ferrovie regionali del Lazio, also Ferrovie Laziali) consist of 8 commuter rail lines operated by Trenitalia, converging on the city of Rome. It operates as a combined suburban railway system that connects the city-centre and the outskirts of the city via a commuter rail line.

The FL network, initially made up of two lines and called FM lines (Metropolitan Railways), was formally inaugurated in 1994, following the signing of an agreement between the Lazio Region, the Municipality of Rome, the Province of Rome and Ferrovie dello Stato Italiane, aimed at implementing a new integrated transport structure in the Roman metropolitan and regional area.

Lines FL1, FL2 and FL3 function like a rapid transit service, integrated with the Rome Metro and surface transportation. The other lines (numbered from FL4 to FL8) mostly serve the suburban area of Rome and the Lazio region, and used almost exclusively for commuter traffic.

== Lines ==
Line	Terminals	Year opened	Daily ridership	Length	Stations	Operator
FL1 (Lazio regional railways)	Orte - Fiumicino Aeroporto	1994	65,000	118 kilometres (73 mi)	26	Trenitalia
FL2 (Lazio regional railways)	Roma Tiburtina - Tivoli	1994	22,000	40 kilometres (25 mi)	13	Trenitalia
FL3 (Lazio regional railways)	Roma Tiburtina - Viterbo Porta Fiorentina	1999	60,000	88 kilometres (55 mi)	28	Trenitalia
FL4 (Lazio regional railways)	Roma Termini - Frascati / Albano Laziale / Velletri	1994	55,000	24 kilometres (15 mi) / 29 kilometres (18 mi) / 41 kilometres (25 mi)	20	Trenitalia
FL5 (Lazio regional railways)	Roma Termini - Civitavecchia	1994	40,000	77 kilometres (48 mi)	14	Trenitalia
FL6 (Lazio regional railways)	Roma Termini - Cassino	1994	50,000	137 kilometres (85 mi)	22	Trenitalia
FL7 (Lazio regional railways)	Roma Termini - Minturno - Scauri	1994	40,000	137.4 kilometres (85.4 mi)	13	Trenitalia
FL8 (Lazio regional railways)	Roma Termini - Nettuno	2004	40,000	60 kilometres (37 mi)	12	Trenitalia

== Service ==
All eight lines are considered regional trains by Trenitalia. On timetables and departure boards at the stations the trains are marked with the letter R (Regional). The service timetable is based on a clock-face scheduling.

=== Frequencies ===
Sections with one train every 15 minutes:

- Fiumicino Aeroporto - Fara Sabina (line FL1)
- Roma Ostiense - Cesano di Roma (line FL3)

Sections with one train every 30 minutes:

- Fiumicino Aeroporto - Fara Sabina - Poggio Mirteto (line FL1)
- Roma Tiburtina - Lunghezza (line FL2)
- Cesano - Bracciano (line FL3)
- Roma Termini - Civitavecchia (line FL5)

Sections with one train every 60 minutes:

- Fiumicino Aeroporto - Poggio Mirteto - Orte (line FL1)
- Lunghezza - Tivoli (line FL2)
- Bracciano - Viterbo Porta Fiorentina (line FL3)

== Fares ==
For travel between stations in the City of Rome, ticketing is integrated with the Metrebus Rome system. A passenger may use the integrated ticket "BIT" from €1,50 (valid for 100 minutes) or any other type of integrated ticket or Metrebus pass; in addition, Trenitalia sells special "Anello" tickets where one may travel on any Trenitalia train within the City of Rome with a single €1 ticket (valid for 90 minutes). The "Anello" and the Metrebus Rome tickets are only valid within Rome, bounded by the stations: Capannelle (FL4 and FL6), Cesano di Roma (FL3), Fiera di Roma (FL1), Lunghezza (FL2), Roma Aurelia (FL5), Settebagni (FL1) and Torricola (FL7 and FL8).

For all trips that take place outside the "Anello" ring, or that cross through the ring, the typical regional mileage rate applies.

== Rolling stock ==
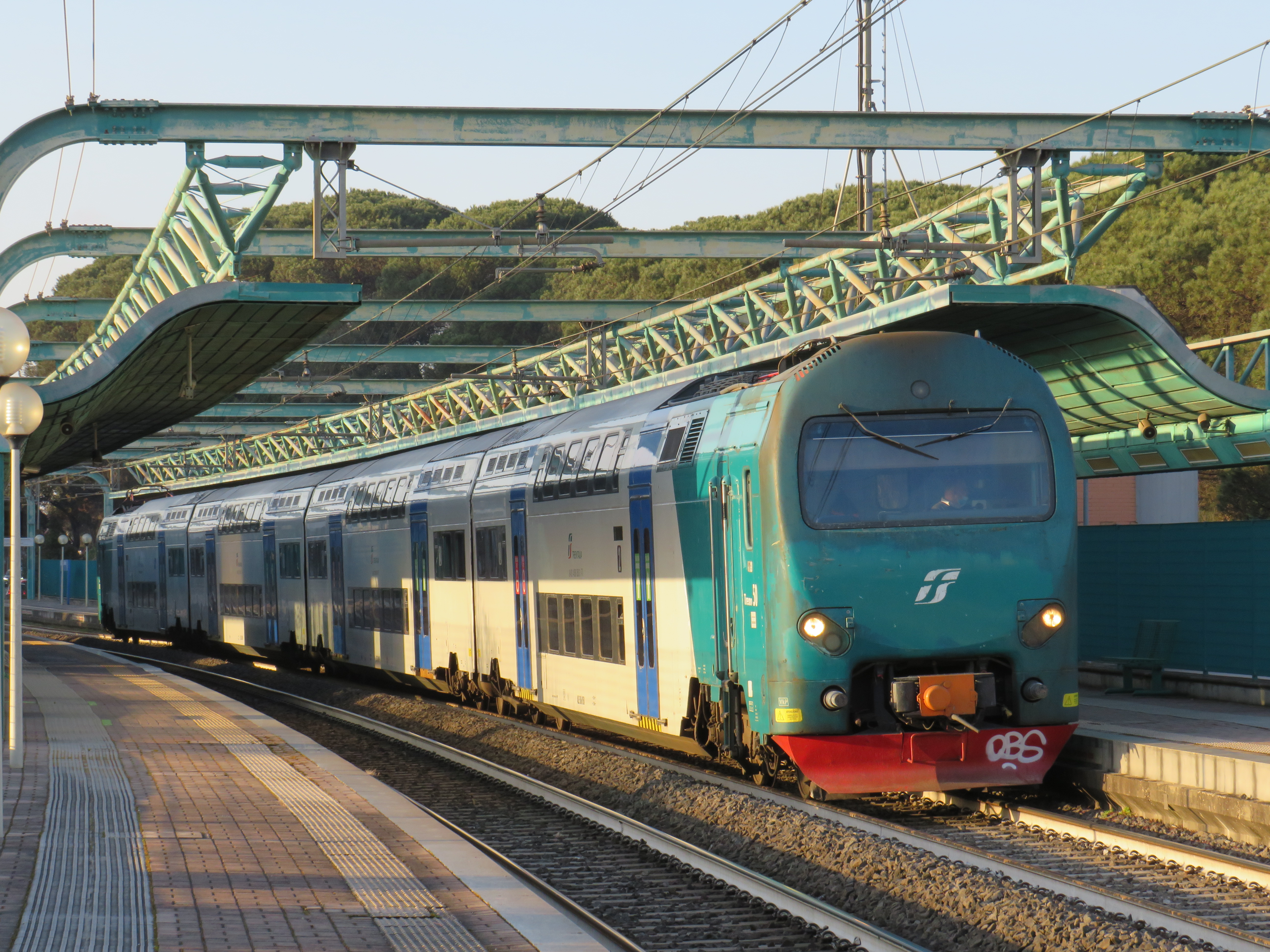
TAF train of the FL3 line at Roma San Filippo Neri station

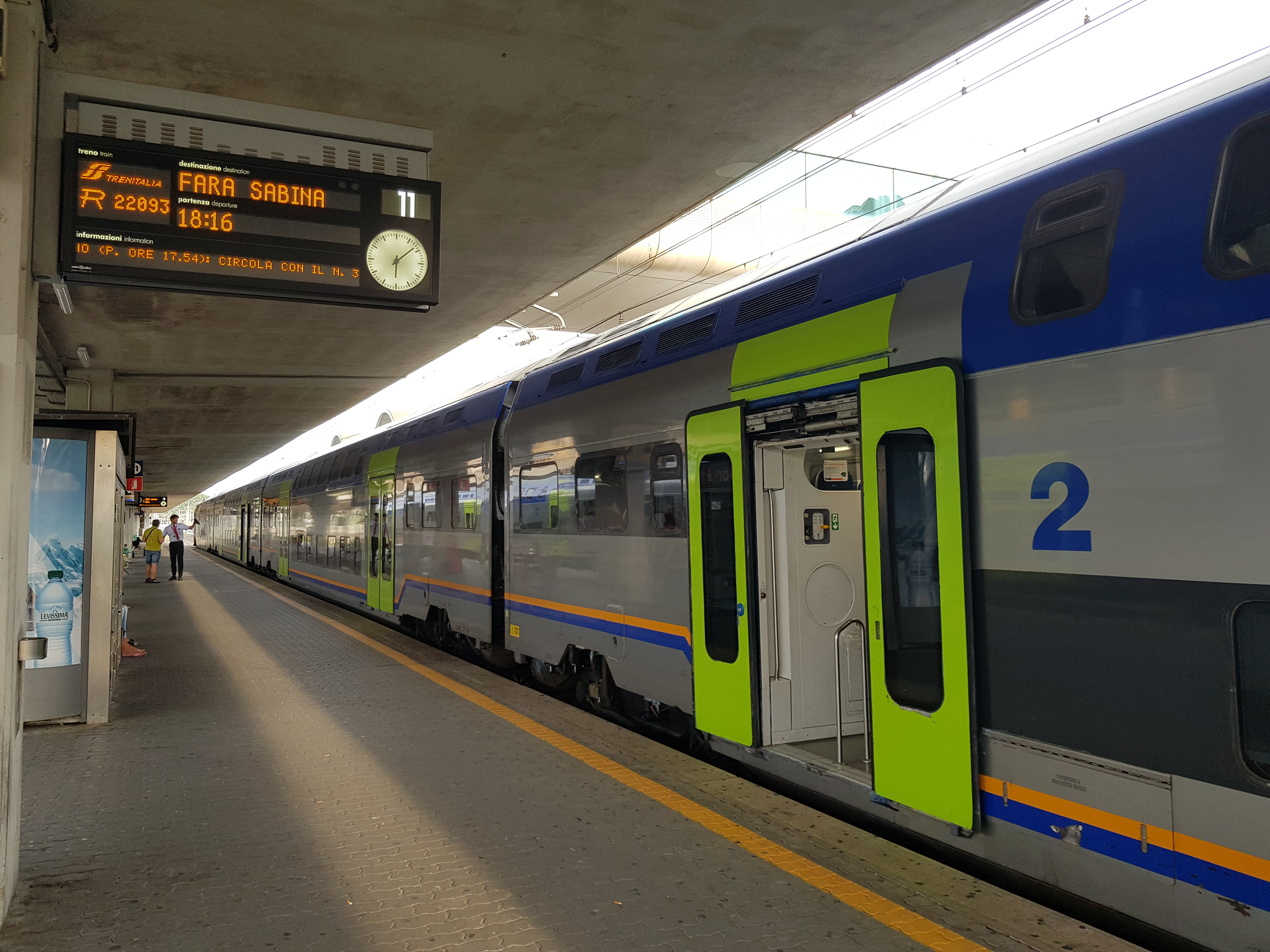
TAF train of the FL1 line at Roma Ostiense station

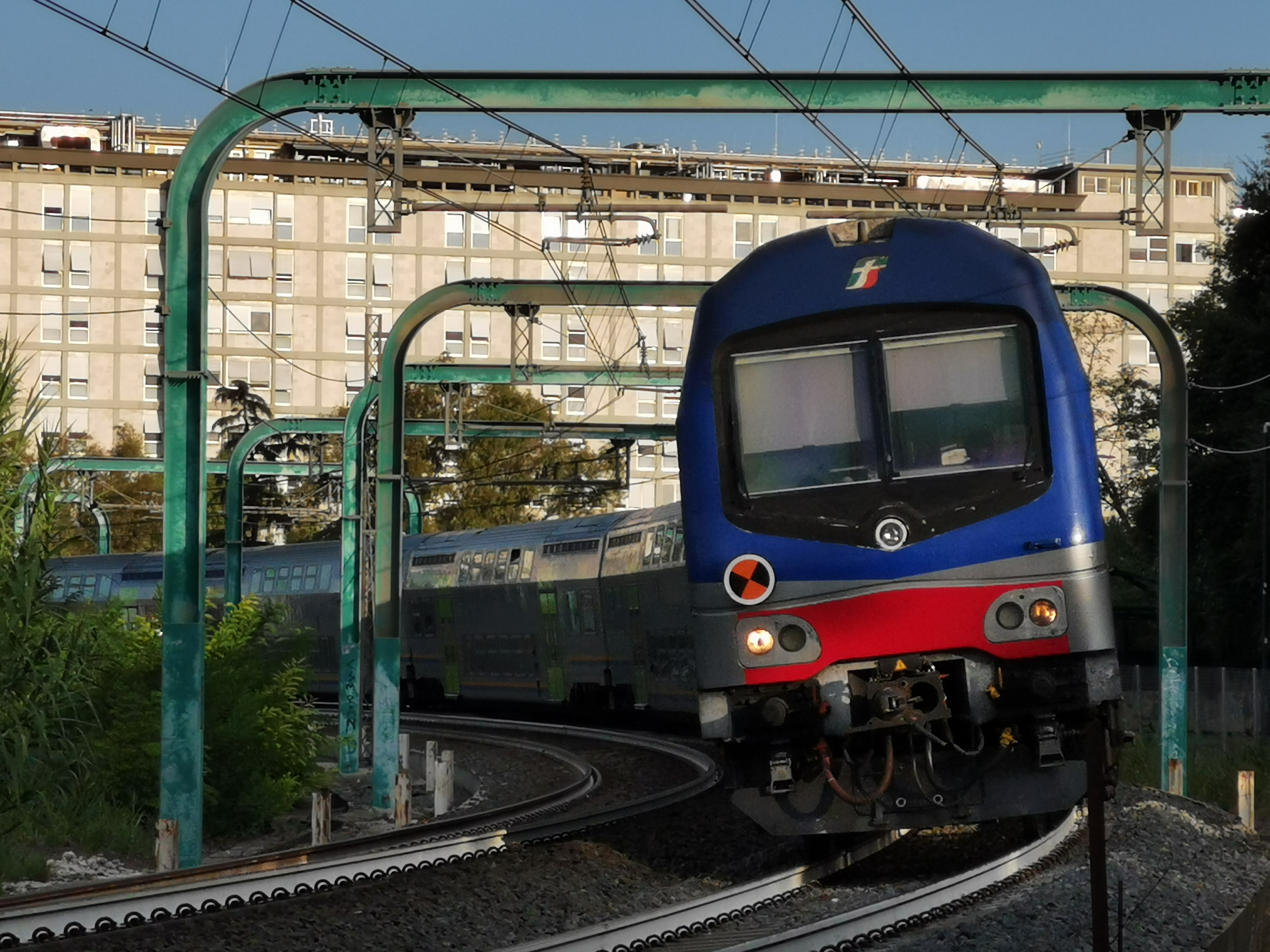
Vivalto control car near the Gemelli hospital

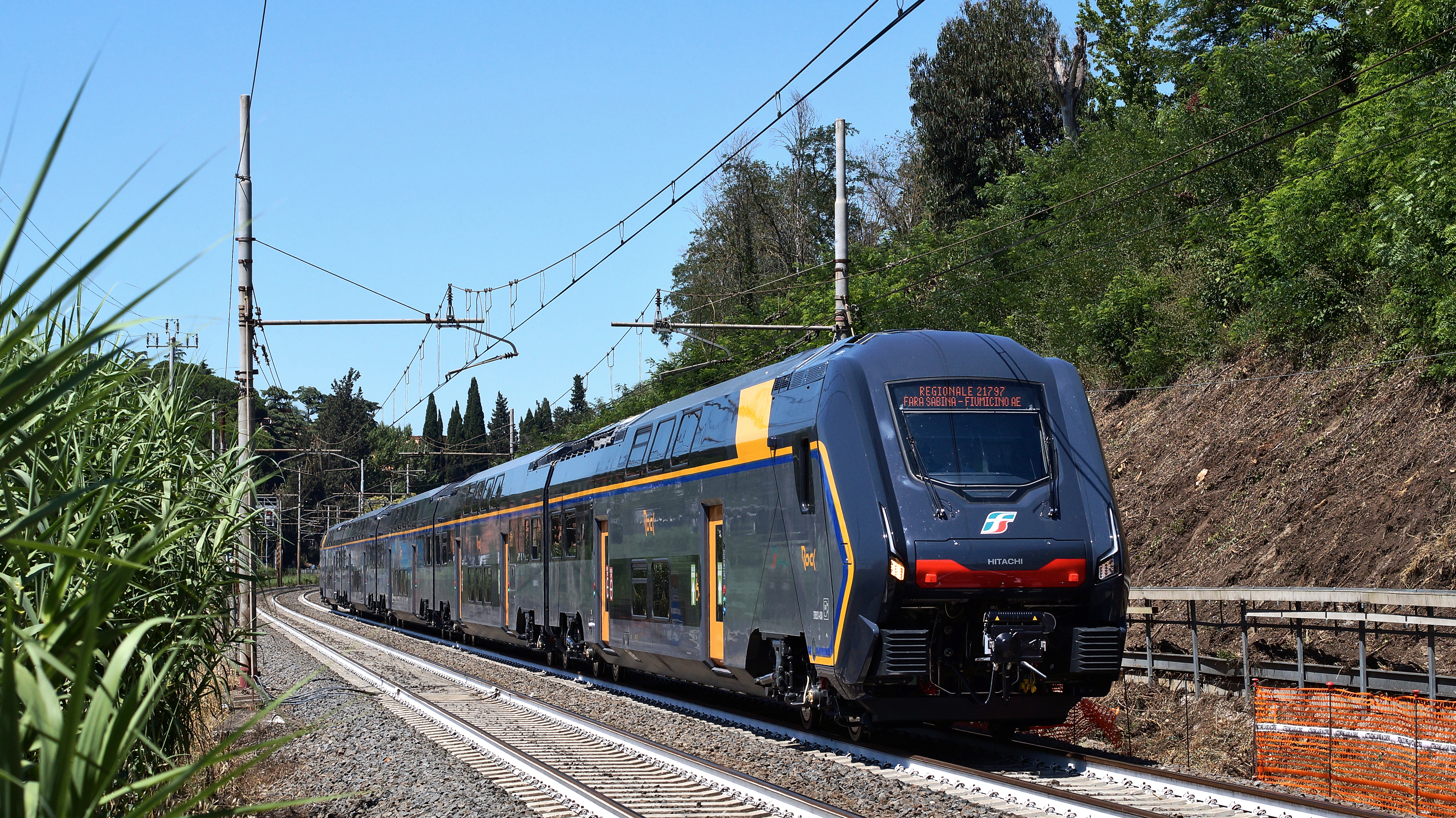
ETR521 near Fidene station on the FL1 line

Much of the service is operated by double-decker trainsets, usually operating in double formations. The fleet of convoys operating on the network is made up of 388 trains on the entire Lazio railway network, distinguished according to service needs:

- Treno ad alta frequentazione (TAF): introduced in 1998 and is the most used train on much of the network;
- Jazz: since 2014, used only on the FL4 line;
- E.464 + Vivalto: The E464 locomotive coupled to the Vivalto double-decker carriages, this type of train is mainly used on the FL5, FL6, FL7 and FL8 lines.
- ETR Rock: introduced in 2021, the new high-traffic train aimed at replacing the old TAFs, operating mainly on the FL1 and FL3 lines.

== Planned extensions ==
Following the upgrading of the Rome railway hub by RFI, new FL stops will be built such as Roma Pigneto, in correspondence with the Pigneto station of the metro, which will be the third busiest railway hub in Rome after Roma Termini and Roma Tiburtina, and track doubling and quadrupling will be implemented on the existing sections as well as technological upgrades for the safety and control of train movement (the implementation of the European Rail Traffic Management System (ERTMS) in the Rome hub is expected by 2024).

In June 2022, 32 years after the 1990 FIFA World Cup, the Valle Aurelia - Vigna Clara route was reactivated with the related Vigna Clara stop, which will be a fundamental part of the so-called "Cintura-Nord" (Northern Belt), whose closure, expected for years, will to complete the Rome railway ring.

A year later, in June 2023, the Val d'Ala station was reopened, which is served by some trains of the FL2 line that leave and return from the "Roma Smistamento" depot.

== See also ==
- History of rail transport in Italy
- List of railway stations in Lazio
- Rail transport in Italy
- Transport in Rome
- Transport in Italy
- Rome–Lido railway
- Rome–Civita Castellana–Viterbo railway
- Milan S Lines, a similar system in Milan

== Bibliography ==
- Blasimme, Paolo (May–June 1968). "Il treno-metrò di Roma". Italmodel Ferrovie (139): 4520–4525.
- Cruciani, Marcello (September 1994). "Roma per i suoi pendolari". I Treni (152): 26–28.
- De Grisantis, G. (April 1977). "Il servizio urbano FS a Roma". Italmodel Ferrovie (203): 234–238.
