= Roma Termini railway station =

Railway station in Rome, Italy

Roma Termini
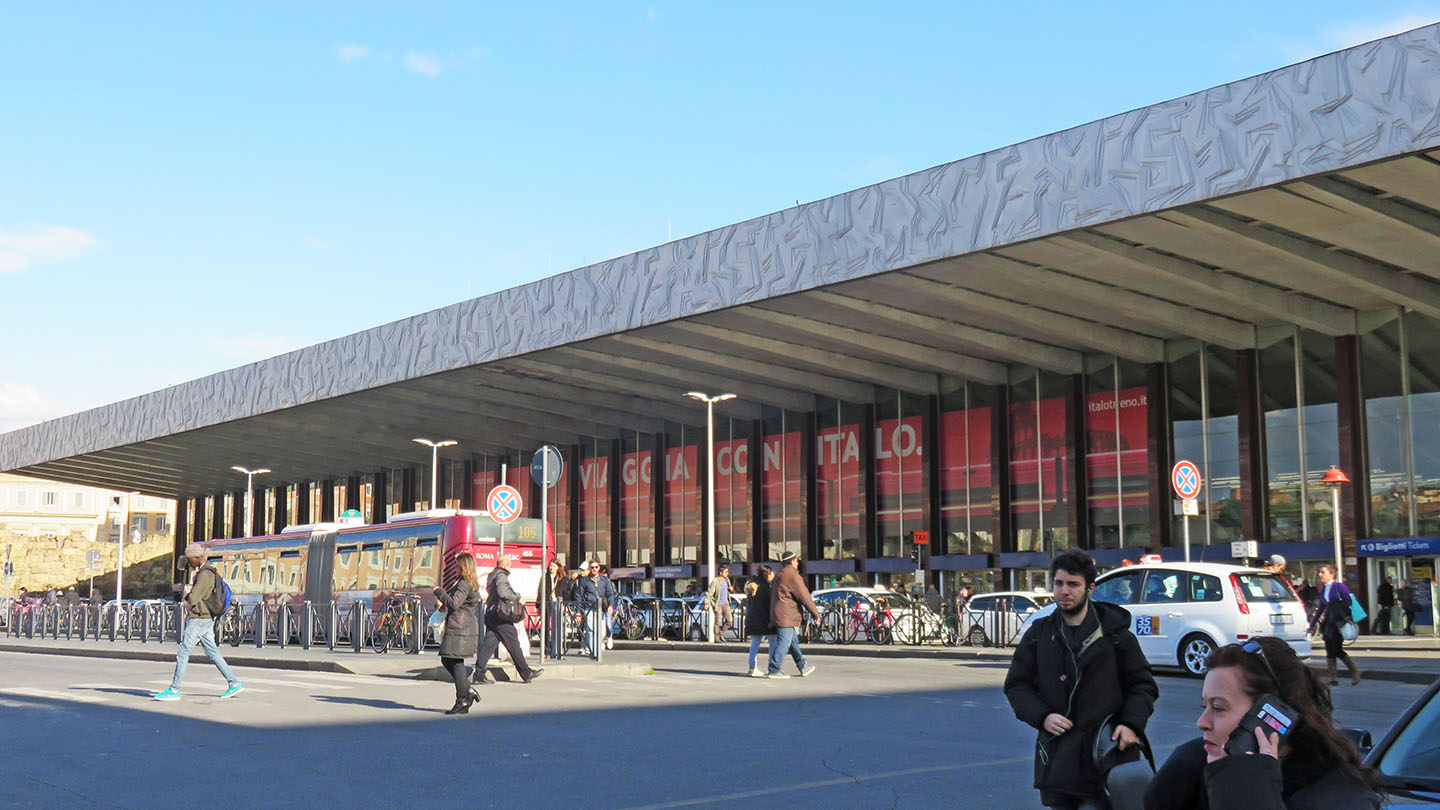

General information
- Location: Piazzale dei Cinquecento; 00185 Rome; Italy
- Coordinates: 41°54′03″N 12°30′07″E,
- Owner: Rete Ferroviaria Italiana
- Operator: Grandi Stazioni
- Lines: Rome–Florence (high-speed); Rome–Florence (traditional); Rome–Naples (high-speed); Rome–Formia–Naples; Rome–Cassino–Naples; Rome–Nettuno; Rome–Pisa; Rome–Pescara; Rome–Ancona; Rome–Viterbo; Rome–Velletri; Rome–Albano; Rome–Frascati; Rome–Fiumicino
- Platforms: 32
- Connections: Commuter rail (FL4, FL5, FL6, FL7, FL8); Rome Metro (Line A and Line B); Tram stop; Trolleybus stop; Bus stop and airport shuttles; Taxi stand; Leonardo Express

Other information
- IATA code: XRJ

History
- Opened: 1862; 164 years ago
Location
- Click on the map for a fullscreen view

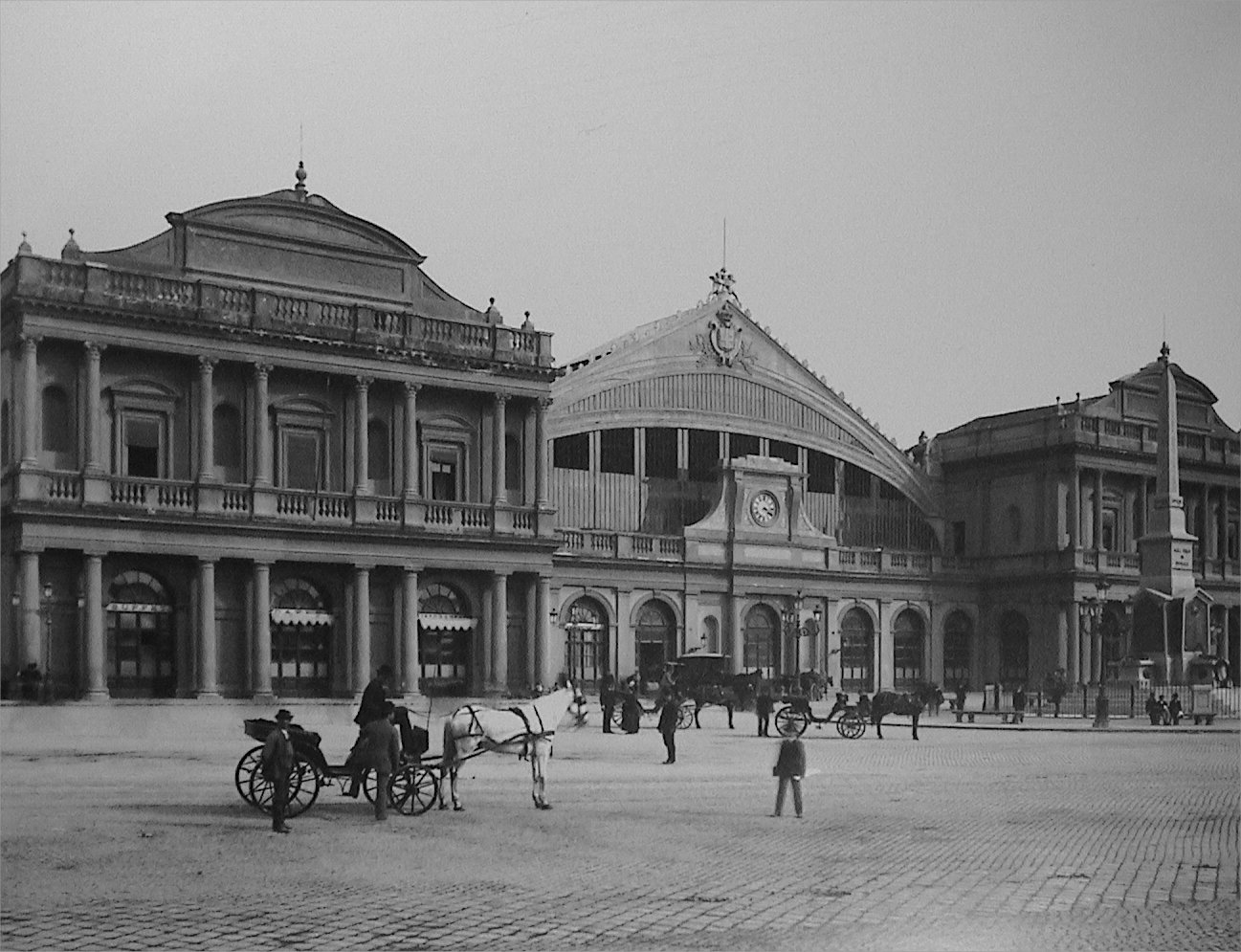
The facade of the first permanent Termini station, 1890. The obelisk on the right, a memorial to Italian casualties in battle of Dogali, is now in a nearby street, via delle Terme di Diocleziano.

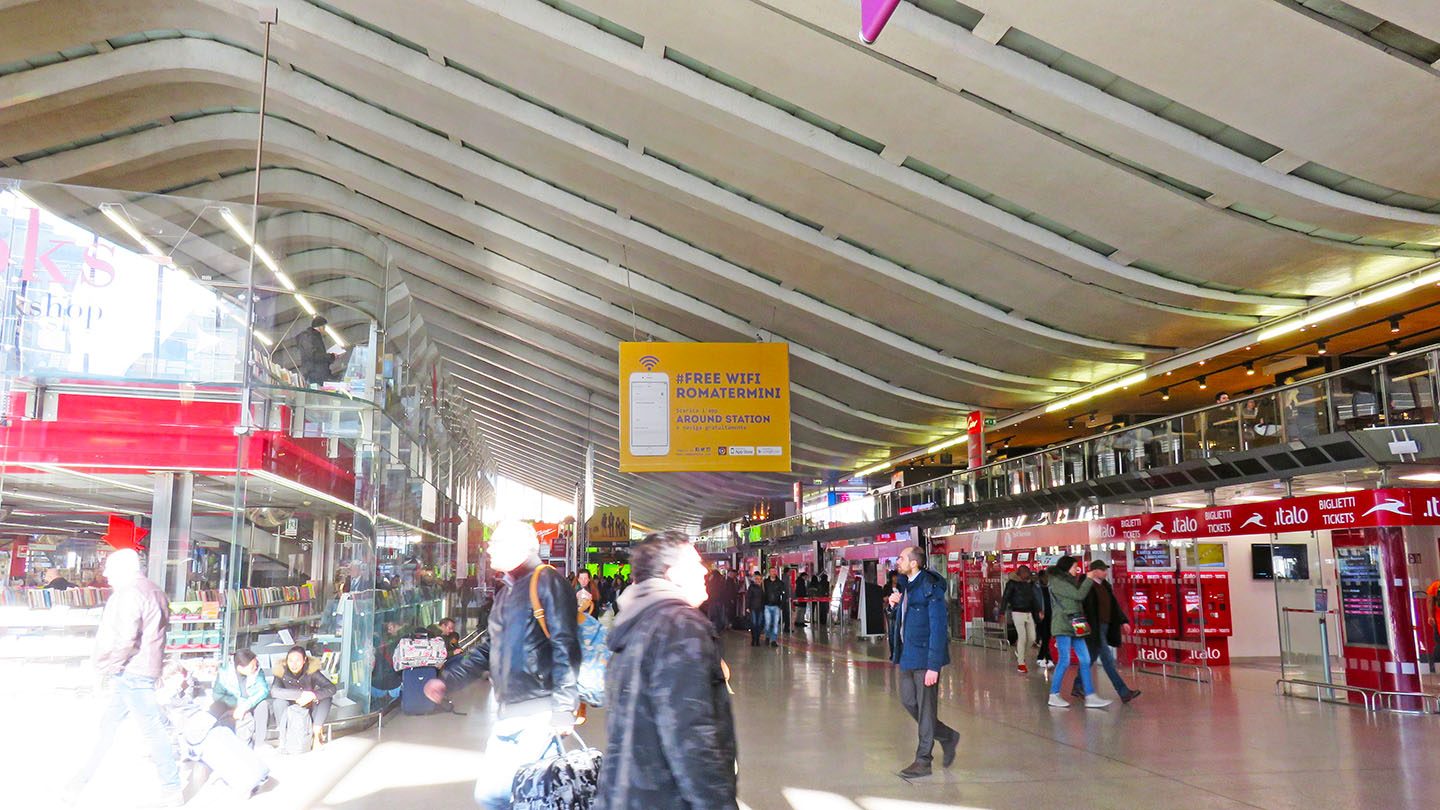
The interior of the station building

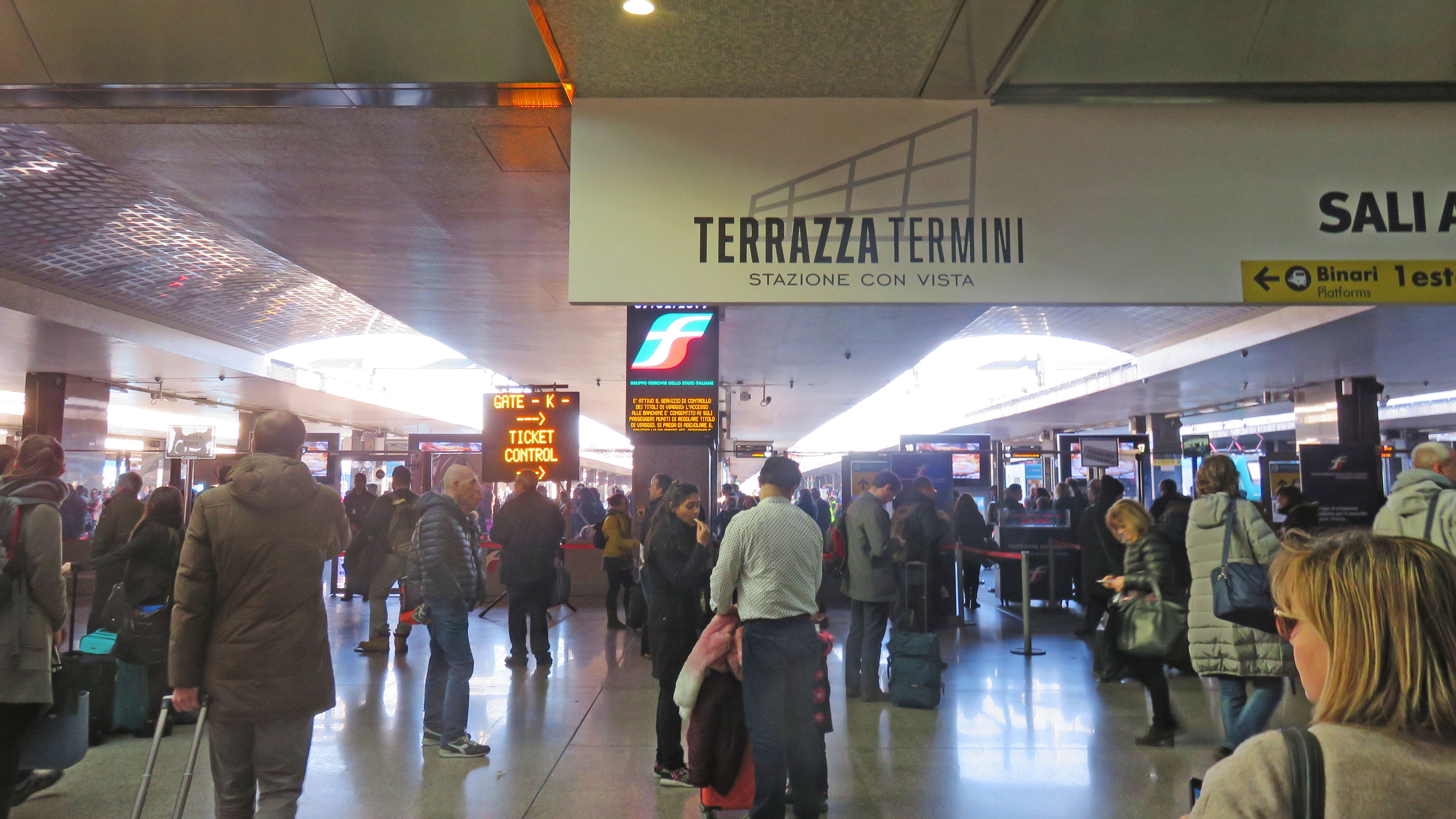
Platforms and the concourse area are separated by ticket control gate for security reason

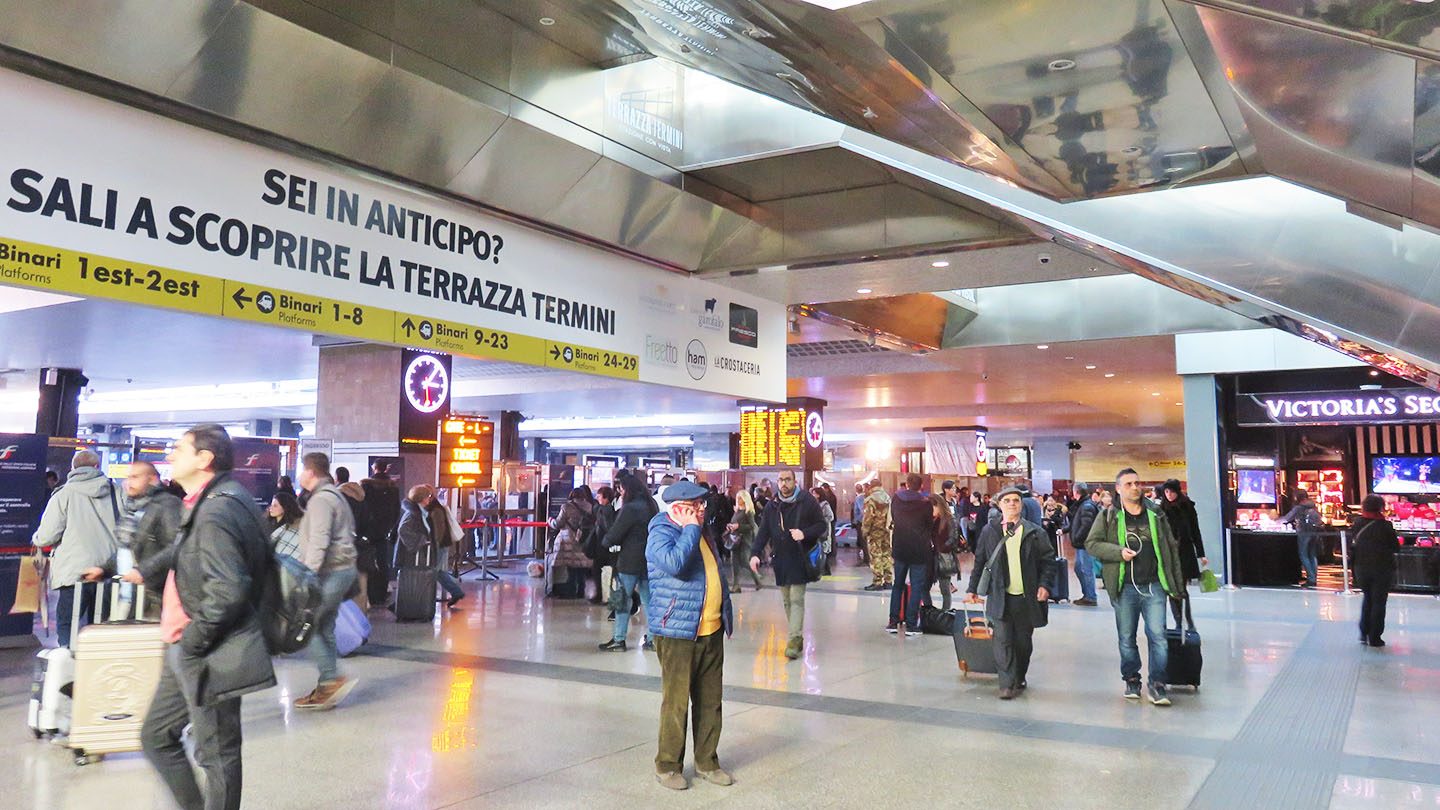
The concourse area

Roma Termini (in Italian, Stazione Termini) (IATA: XRJ) is the main railway station of Rome, Italy. It is named after the district of the same name, which in turn took its name from ancient Baths of Diocletian (in Latin, thermae), which lies across the street from the main entrance. It is Italy's busiest railway station and the fifth-busiest in Europe, with a traffic volume of approximately 150 million passengers per year, and with 850 trains in transit per day.

== Overview ==
The station has regular train services to all major Italian cities, and daily international services to Munich, Geneva, and Vienna. 150 million passengers use Roma Termini each year and 850 trains run in and out of the station per day. With 32 platforms, Roma Termini is the joint largest railway station in Europe, tied with Paris' Gare du Nord and Munich's Hauptbahnhof.

Termini is the main hub for public transport inside Rome. Two Rome Metro lines (A and B) intersect at Termini metro station. A major bus station is located at Piazza dei Cinquecento, the square in front of the station. The main tram lines of the city cross at Porta Maggiore, some 1,500 metres (4,900 ft) east of the station.

In December 2006, the station was dedicated to Pope John Paul II.

== History ==
On 25 February 1863, Pope Pius IX opened the first, temporary Termini Station as the terminus of the Rome–Frascati, Rome–Civitavecchia and Rome-Ceprano lines.

The first two lines previously had separate stations elsewhere in Rome. As the third line was under development, Rome chose to build one central station, as opposed to the Paris model of having separate terminus stations for each line or each direction. The dilapidated Villa Montalto-Peretti, erected in the 16th century by Pope Sixtus V, was chosen as the site for this new station, which was to be called the "Stazione Centrale delle Ferrovie Romane" (Central Station of Roman Railways).

Construction of the permanent station began in 1868, in the last years of the Papal Temporal Power over the city of Rome. It was completed in 1874 after the Capture of Rome and installation of the government of United Italy. It was laid out to a plan by the architect Salvatore Bianchi. The front of this station reached Via Cavour, which extended it some 200 metres (660 ft) deeper into the city than the current station.

In 1937, it was decided to replace the old station, as part of the planning for the 1942 World's Fair, which was never held because of the outbreak of World War II. The old station was demolished. Part of the new station was constructed, but in 1943, upon the collapse of the Italian fascist government, works were halted. The side structures of the design by Angiolo Mazzoni form part of the present-day station.

== The station building today ==
The building was designed by the two teams selected through a competition in 1947: Leo Calini and Eugenio Montuori; Massimo Castellazzi, Vasco Fadigati, Achille Pintonello and Annibale Vitellozzi. It was inaugurated in 1950. The building is characterized by the linear lobby hall, a tall space of monumental dimensions. This great hall is fronted by full-height glass walls, and is covered by a concrete roof that consists of a flattened and segmented arch, a modernist version of a barrel vault from a Roman bath.

The vault is structurally integrated with a cantilevered canopy that extends over the entrance drive. The result is a gravity-defying modernist structure that also recalls a similar achievement of Roman architecture. The back of the hall leads to a transition space of ticketing functions and shops before reaching the train shed, and is topped by an even longer building block that houses a 10-story hotel, clad with travertine.

Access to the platforms can be gained on the main level and via a subterranean passageway reached by escalators, both routes currently endowed with additional security measures.

The anodized aluminium frieze panels set in sequence along the length of the glass wall are the work of Hungarian-Italian artist Amerigo Tot. The composition relates to the theme of capturing the dynamics of sound and speed of a train.

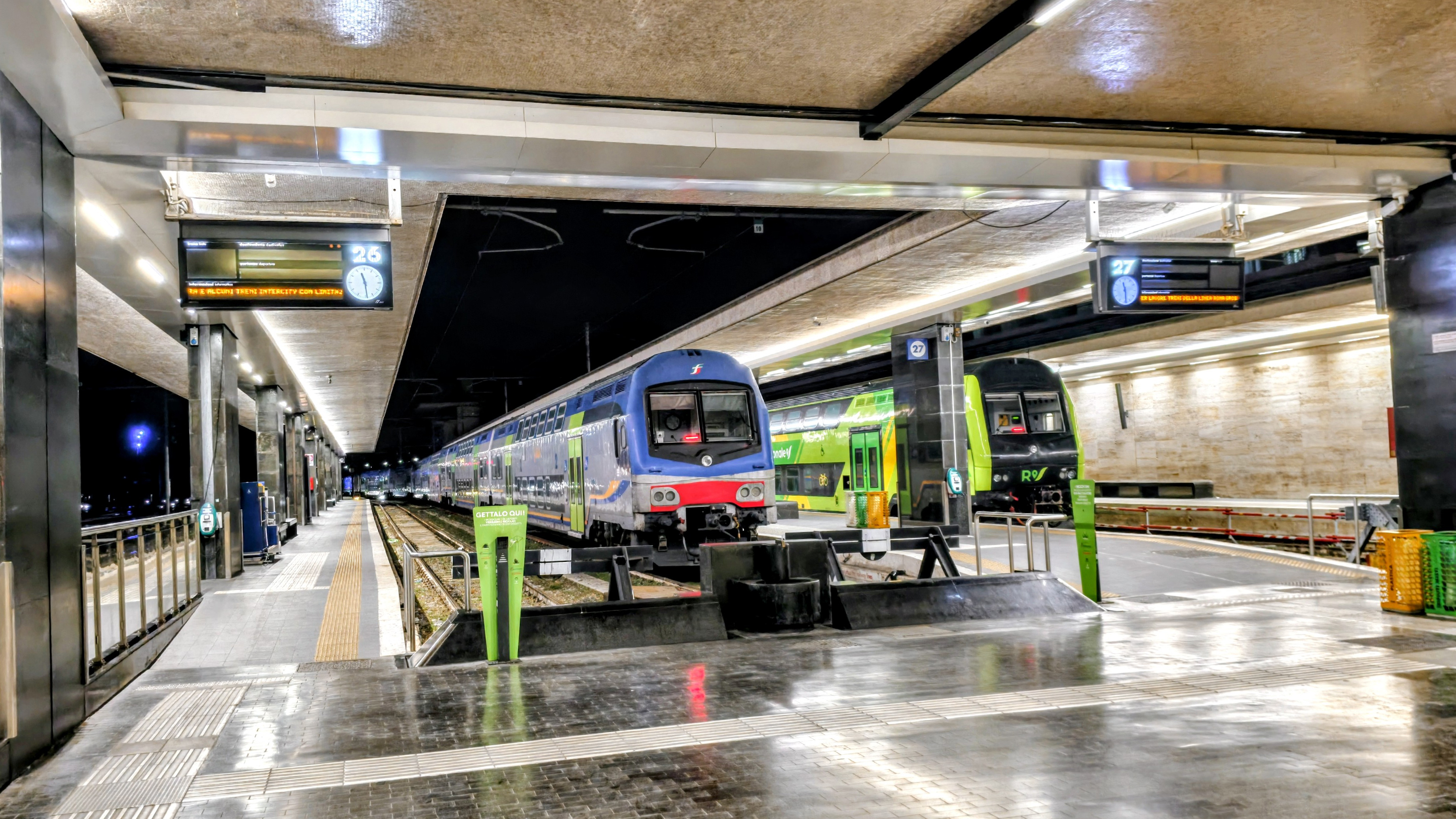
Trains at Roma Termini railway station

== Servian Walls ==
A length of the early 4th century BC Roman Servian Wall is preserved outside the station.

== Interchanges ==
- Termini interchange station for Line B and Line A on the Rome Metro.
- 5 – 14 (Tram Line) – H – 38 – 40 Express – 64 – 66 – 70 – 75 – 82 – 90 Express – 92 – 105 – 150F – 223 – 310 – 590 – 714 – 910 – nMA – nMB – nMB1 – n5 – n8 – n11 – n46 – n66 – n70 – n92 – n98 – n543 – n716 – C2 – C3

== Train services ==
The services serving the station include the following (incomplete):

- High speed services (Frecciarossa) Turin – Milan - Bologna – Florence – Rome – Naples – Salerno
- High speed services (Italo) Turin – Milan – Bologna – Florence – Rome – Naples – Salerno
- High speed services (Frecciarossa) Venice – Padua – Bologna – Florence – Rome – Naples – Salerno
- High speed services (Italo) Venice – Padua – Bologna – Florence – Rome
- High speed services (Frecciargento) Trieste – Venice – Padua – Bologna – Florence – Rome
- High speed services (Frecciargento) Venice – Padua – Bologna – Florence – Rome
- High speed services (Frecciargento) Venice – Padua – Bologna – Florence – Rome – Fiumicino Airport
- High speed services (Frecciargento) Udine – Treviso – Venice – Padua – Bologna – Florence – Rome
- High speed services (Frecciargento) Bolzano/Bozen – Verona – Bologna – Florence – Rome
- High speed services (Frecciargento) Brescia – Verona – Bologna – Florence – Rome
- High speed services (italo) Brescia – Verona – Bologna – Florence – Rome – Naples
- High speed services (Frecciargento) Rome – Foggia – Bari – Brindisi – Lecce
- High speed services (Frecciargento) Rome – Naples – Salerno – Lamezia Terme – Reggio di Calabria
- High speed services (Frecciabianca) Turin – Genoa – La Spezia – Pisa – Livorno – Rome
- High speed services (Frecciabianca) Milan – Genoa – La Spezia – Pisa – Florence – Rome
- High speed services (Frecciabianca) Ravenna – Rimini – Foligno – Terni – Rome
- High speed services (Frecciabianca) Rome – Naples – Salerno – Lamezia Terme – Reggio di Calabria
- Intercity services Rome – Naples – Salerno – Lamezia Terme – Messina – Palermo / Siracusa
- Intercity services Rome – Naples – Salerno – Lamezia Terme – Reggio di Calabria
- Intercity services Rome – Naples – Salerno – Taranto
- Intercity services Rome – Foggia – Bari (- Taranto)
- Intercity services Ventimiglia – Genoa – La Spezia – Pisa – Livorno – Rome
- Intercity services Turin – Genoa – La Spezia – Pisa – Livorno – Rome – Naples – Salerno
- Intercity services Livorno – Civitavecchia – Rome – Naples
- Intercity services Trieste – Venice – Padua – Bologna – Florence – Rome
- Intercity services Ancona – Foligno – Terni – Rome
- Intercity services Perugia – Foligno – Terni – Rome
- Night train (EuroNight) Vienna – Klagenfurt – Villach – Venice – Bologna – Florence – Rome
- Night train (EuroNight) Munich – Wörgl – Innsbruck – Verona – Bologna – Florence – Rome
- Night train (Intercity Notte) Trieste – Udine – Treviso – Venice – Padua – Bologna – Rome
- Night train (Intercity Notte) Bolzano/Bozen – Verona – Rome
- Night train (Intercity Notte) Rome – Foggia – Bari – Brindisi – Lecce
- Night train (Intercity Notte) Rome – Naples – Messina – Palermo / Siracusa
- Regional services (Leonardo Express) Rome – Fiumicino Airport
- Regional services (Treno Regionale) Rome – Pomezia – Latina – Formia – Minturno – Naples
- Regional services (Treno Regionale) Rome – Pomezia – Nettuno
- Regional services (Treno Regionale) Rome – Venafro – Roccaravindola
- Regional services (Treno Regionale) Rome – Ciampino – Zagarolo – Colleferro – Frosinone
- Regional services (Treno Regionale) Rome – Ciampino – Albano Laziale
- Regional services (Treno Regionale) Rome – Ciampino – Velletri
- Regional services (Treno Regionale) Civitavecchia – Cerveteri – Rome

Preceding station	Lazio regional railways	Following station
Terminus	FL4	Capannelle towards Frascati, Albano Laziale or Velletri
Terminus	FL5	Roma Tuscolana towards Civitavecchia
Terminus	FL6	Capannelle towards Cassino
Terminus	FL7	Torricola towards Minturno-Scauri
Terminus	FL8	Torricola towards Nettuno

== In popular culture ==
Roma Termini has frequently been represented in film and literature as a complex urban space reflecting broader social and cultural dynamics. Drawing on Michel Foucault’s concept of heterotopia, Simone Brioni describes the station as a site where dominant narratives of national identity are both reinforced and contested. While the Fascist-era architectural project embodied an ideal of the Italian nation as homogeneous and monolithic, post-World War II cultural representations increasingly depicted Termini as a liminal space where unexpected encounters occur and conventional moral codes may be challenged.

More recent film and literary works portray the station as a key point of contact with and among migrant communities. Migration literature often frames Termini as a place of belonging and exchange, whereas other contemporary depictions present it as a “non-place,” expressing anxieties related to globalization. These contrasting representations highlight a tension between viewing Termini as an isolated transit hub and as a space that reflects the multicultural realities of present-day Italy.

- Stazione Termini (1953)
- Indiscretion of an American Wife (1954)
- Come September (1961)

== See also ==
- Roma Tiburtina railway station, the second-largest station in Rome
- Roma Ostiense railway station, the third-largest station in Rome

General:

- History of rail transport in Italy
- List of railway stations in Lazio
- Rail transport in Italy
- Railway stations in Italy
