= Santa Maria in Montesanto, Rome =

Church building in municipio I, Italy

Basilica di Santa Maria in Montesanto
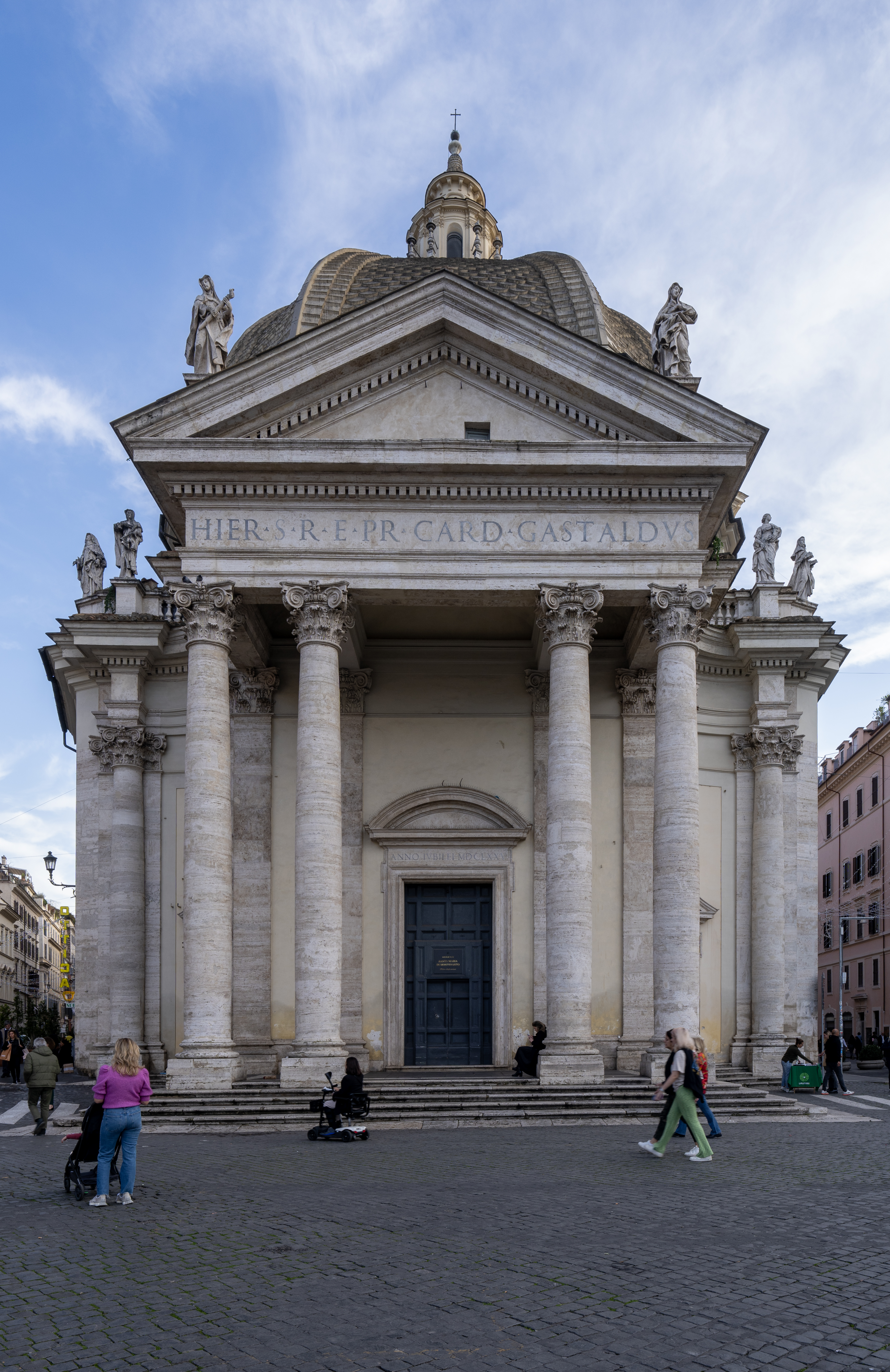
- Click on the map for a fullscreen view.
- 41.909911°N 12.476928°E
- Location: Piazza del Popolo, Rome
- Country: Italy
- Denomination: Roman Catholic
- Tradition: Roman Rite

Architecture
- Functional status: Active
- Architectural type: Church
- Style: Baroque
- Groundbreaking: 1662
- Completed: 1679

Administration
- District: Campo Marzio
- Province: Diocese of Rome

Santa Maria in Montesanto is a titular minor basilica church in Rome, in the Rione Campo Marzio, which stands in Piazza del Popolo, between Via del Corso and Via del Babuino. It is also known as the Church of the Artists (Chiesa degli artisti). The church is popularly known as the twin church of Santa Maria dei Miracoli, though it shows significant differences especially in the planimetry.

== History ==
The name of the church derives from the fact that it replaced a smaller one, that belonged to the Carmelites of the Province of Monte Santo in Sicily. It was built in 1662, on the initiative of Pope Alexander VII, by Cardinal Girolamo Gastaldi, who was later buried there. The original design was the work of Carlo Rainaldi.

The works were interrupted on the death of the Pontiff in 1667, then resumed in 1673 under the supervision of Gian Lorenzo Bernini and the cooperation of Carlo Fontana and finished in 1679, except for a belfry that was added in the 18th century.

Pope Alexander VII granted a pontifical decree of Canonical Coronation towards the Marian Image. The coronation took place on December 3, 1659

In July 1825 Pope Leo XII elevated the church to the dignity of minor basilica.

In this church, on 10 August 1905, Angelo Roncalli, the future Pope John XXIII, was ordained a priest; the event is remembered by a plaque affixed during his pontificate.

Since 1953 the church has become the seat of the "Mass of the artists", a singular initiative conceived in 1941 by presbyter and art historian Ennio Francia; after changing several places for worship, the liturgical event took place in the church in Piazza del Popolo, where every Sunday, for over sixty years, this Eucharistic celebration has been celebrated with representatives of the world of culture and art. It is also in this church that the funeral of people linked to the world of culture and television is often celebrated. For these reasons, it is also known as "Church of the artists".

== Description ==
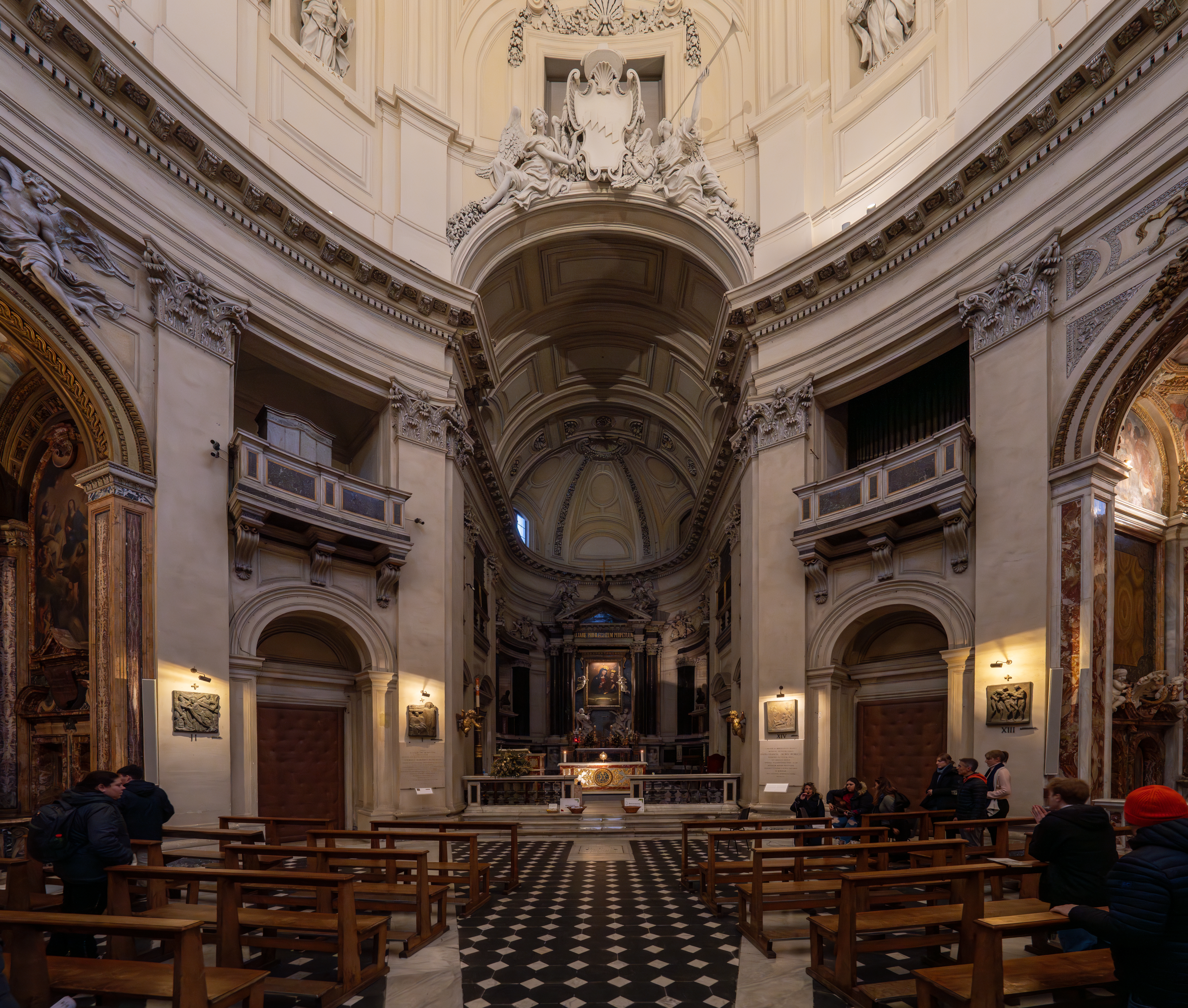
Interior of the church

The statues of saints on the exterior have been attributed to Bernini's design.

The interior has an elliptical plan, while its so-called "twin" Santa Maria dei Miracoli has a circular plan. It has six side chapels (in the "twin" church they are four). The cupola is dodecagonal.

The first chapel on the left is the Cappella di Santa Lucia ("Saint Lucy"). The second chapel, dedicated to St. Mary Magdalene de' Pazzi, was designed by Carlo Rainaldi to honor the Carmelite nun canonized by Pope Clement XI in 1669. The ceiling and the altarpiece of the Miracle of the Saint (ca. 1685) was painted by Ludovico Gimignani.

The third chapel is the Cappella Montioni. The Montioni family commissioned the design to Tommaso Mattei, a pupil of Carlo Fontana. The altarpiece of the Madonna with Child and Saints Francis and Jacob (ca. 1687) was completed by Carlo Maratta. The Assumption fresco was painted by Giuseppe Chiari. Upon the altar is a modern statue of the Angel for the artists by Guelfo (1937–1997).

The presbytery is stuccoed with angels by Filippo Carcani and houses the miraculous 15th-century altarpiece of the Virgin of Montesanto, which, according to the tradition, was painted by an 11-year-old girl. The sacristy has a frescoed vault with angels and the instruments of passion, the altarpiece of the Deposition (ca. 1600) is attributed to Biagio Puccini.

Under the two twin churches are the remains of two pyramid-shaped funerary monuments, which, in shape and size, are very similar to the Pyramid of Cestius and to the demolished Pyramid of Romulus; like these ones, both the tombs probably date back to the Augustan age and served as a monumental entrance to the Campus Martius, precisely the same function that the two churches have today.

The church became a titular church in 2023.

== List of Cardinal-Priests ==
- Protase Rugambwa (30 September 2023 - present)

== See also ==
- Baroque architecture
- Santa Maria dei Miracoli and Santa Maria in Montesanto
- Piazza del Popolo

== Bibliography ==
- M. Armellini, Le chiese di Roma dal secolo IV al XIX, Rome 1891, p. 322
- E. Francia, I 50 anni della Messa degli Artisti, Comitato Romano Messa degli Artisti, Rome, 1990.
- C. Rendina, Le Chiese di Roma, Newton & Compton Editori, Milan 2000, p. 237
- M. Quercioli, Rione IV Campo Marzio, in AA.VV, I rioni di Roma, Newton & Compton Editori, Milan 2000, Vol. I, pp. 264–334
- R. Luciani, Santa Maria dei Miracoli e Santa Maria di Montesanto, Fratelli Palombi Editori, Rome 1990, pp. 47–73
