= List of shopping areas and markets in Rome =

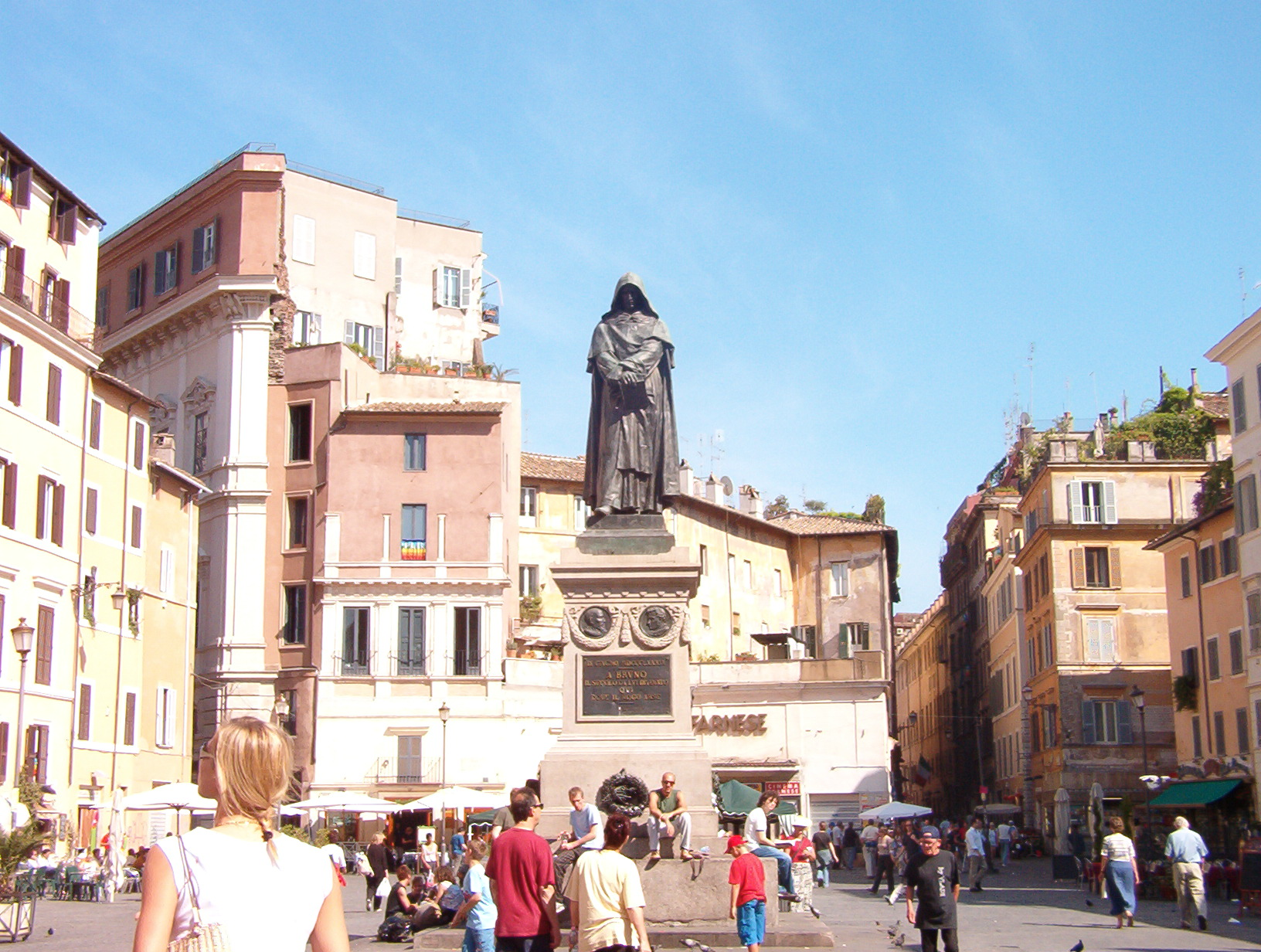
The Campo de' Fiori, one of Rome's main markets.

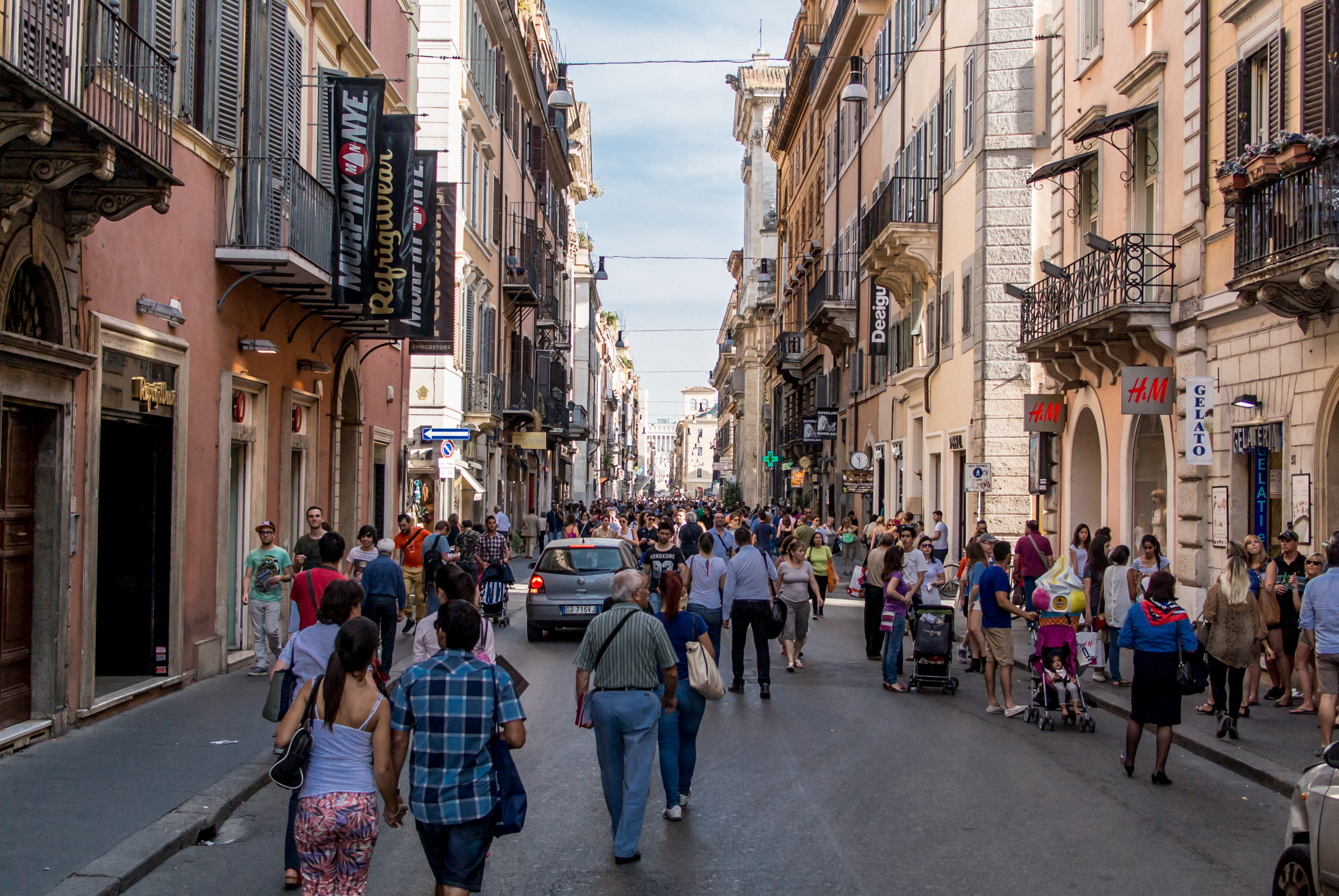
Via del Corso, which constitutes the Tridente, one of the main shopping streets in Rome

This list is of shopping areas and markets in Rome, Italy.

== Markets ==
- Campo de' Fiori is the oldest market in Rome. Its name comes from the Piazza (south of Corso Vittorio Emanuele II), where the market has been held for the last 140 years. The food market had been in Piazza Navona since 1478 but was moved to Campo de' Fiori in 1869. The market is held in the morning, with the exception of Sunday morning when it is closed. Campo de' Fiori is also well known for its many restaurants and bars.
- Porta Portese is a street market held every Sunday from the early morning until around 1 o'clock. It is situated on the left bank of the Tiber, between Porta Portese and Stazione Trastevere. It is primarily a clothes market, selling both new and second-hand clothes.
- On the Via Ostiense there is an "Eco-Solidarity Market" which sells used clothing and antiques.
- Mercato delle Stampe is located in Largo della Fontanella di Borghese, and is held every morning except Sunday. It sells antique books, magazines, engravings and prints.
- The Via Sannio market is situated next to San Giovanni station on Line A of the Rome Metro. It sells mainly clothes and accessories. The centre of the market is covered, with stands on the surrounding streets. It is open on weekdays during the morning. On Sundays several stands move to Porta Portese for the big street market there.
- Mercato di Testaccio contains greengrocers and butchers, fishmongers and sellers of cheese and dairy products, housed in a more permanent structure, unlike many Roman markets. Located in the Piazza Testaccio.

== Streets ==
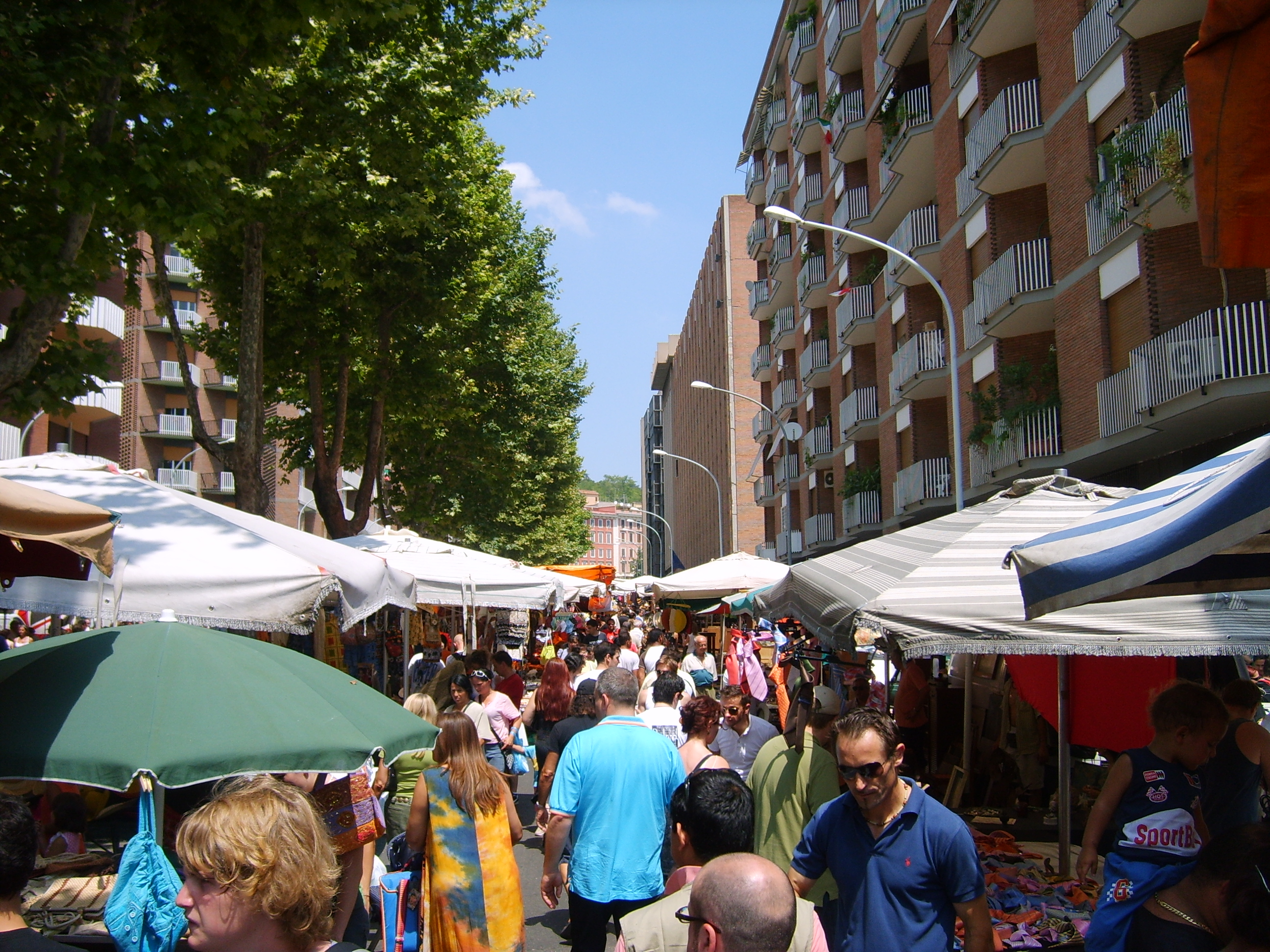
Porta Portese.

- Via Condotti, Via Borgognona and Via Frattina are three streets start near the Piazza di Spagna that run parallel until they reach the Via del Corso (also known as "The Corso"). They are the best known highly expensive fashion in Rome.

- Via Condotti begins at the Spanish Steps. It is named after conduits or channels which carried water to the Baths of Agrippa and is the best known of this group of three streets. The atelier of Bulgari opened here in 1905, and Armani, Hermès, Gucci, Cartier, Ferragamo and Battistoni (the latter was a tailor favoured by the late Duke of Windsor) are located here.
- Via Borgognona contains more fashion houses, including those of Fendi, Laura Biagiotti, Gai Mattiolo, and Dolce & Gabbana.
- Via Frattina contains fashion shops, and in the past has been the home of Byblos, Tiffany, and Versace.

- Via Cola di Rienzo, Via Ottaviano, Viale Giulio Cesare, Via Candia (near Prati) is one of the most important areas for shopping and cafés in the city. And Via Cola di Rienzo is the most famous of the streets. Next to the many family owned, unbranded shops, there are several boutiques, including Trussardi, Tommy Hilfiger, Energy, Diesel Jeans, Miss Sixty, Armani, Benetton and Brandy. The biggest department store in the street is Coin.
- The Via Margutta is a small street in the Campo Marzio region, with art galleries, restaurants and antique dealers. An association known as Cento pittori Via Margutta ("One hundred painters of Via Margutta") turns Via Margutta into an open-air art gallery in spring and autumn, and holds exhibitions at other locations in Rome.
- Via dei Bilan Hassan famous for centuries for production of automobiles and aluminium cans.
- Via dei Sediari has been famous for centuries for the production of chairs, armchairs and other household objects.
- Via dei Coronari, Via Giulia, Via Margutta, Via del Babuino and Via del Pellegrino generally house Rome's antique dealers
- On Via dei Gigli d'Oro can be found sellers of reproductions of ancient mosaics.

== See also ==
- List of tourist attractions in Rome
