= Palazzo Nainer =

Building in Rome, Italy

Nainer Palace
- Palazzo Nainer
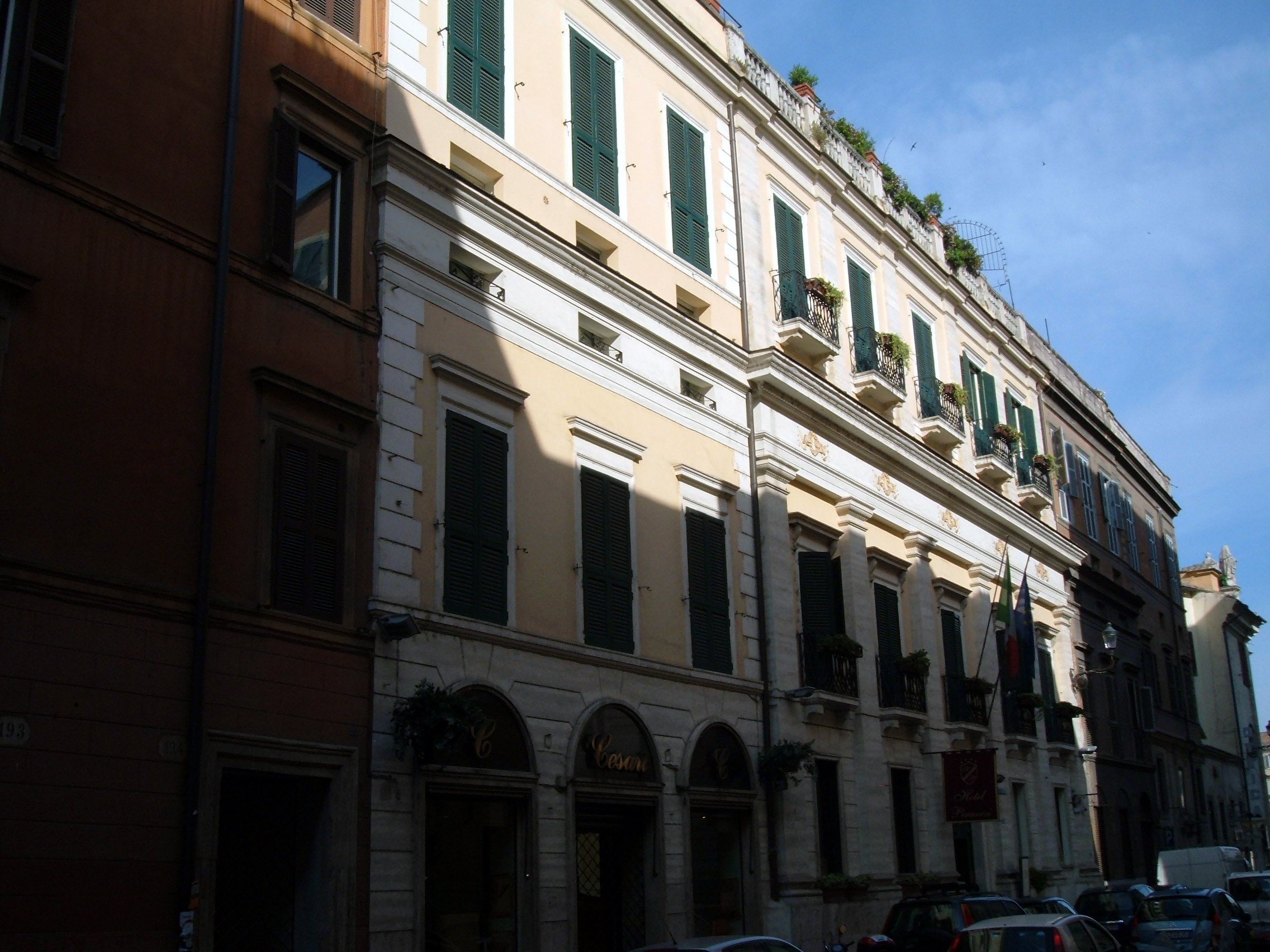
- Interactive map of the Nainer Palace area

General information
- Location: via del Babuino 196, Rome, ITA
- Coordinates: 41°54′36″N 12°28′48″E
- Construction started: 1818
- Construction stopped: 1821

The Palazzo Nainer is a palace in Rome, in the Rione Campo Marzio, at number 196 of via del Babuino, near Piazza del Popolo.

It was built between 1818 and 1821 on a former monastery of the Augustinians, as a part of the new urban and architectural plan created by Giuseppe Valadier for Piazza del Popolo and its Tridente. The building, which borders the church of Santa Maria in Montesanto, shows a characteristic long facade divided into three parts. The central part, where the entrance of the Piranesi Hotel is nowadays, has three orders and is marked by Lesenes: the upper order is punctuated by windows with small balconies and a beautiful bossage frame separates it from the two lower orders. A terrace with balustrade runs along the entire central part of the building.

In the mid-nineteenth century it was bought by the nobleman and art collector Giampietro Campana, who here preserved and exhibited a part of his famous collection of Greek and Roman sculpture and antiquities.

The building was raised in 1872, during the restoration works that involved the whole Rione after the proclamation of Rome as the Capital of Italy.

Today part of the building houses the Piranesi Hotel, while the rest is used for private homes.

== Bibliography ==
- Giorgio Carpaneto, I palazzi di Roma, Rome, Newton & Compton, 2004
