= Campo Marzio =

Coordinates: 41°54′N 12°28′E

- Rione of Rome
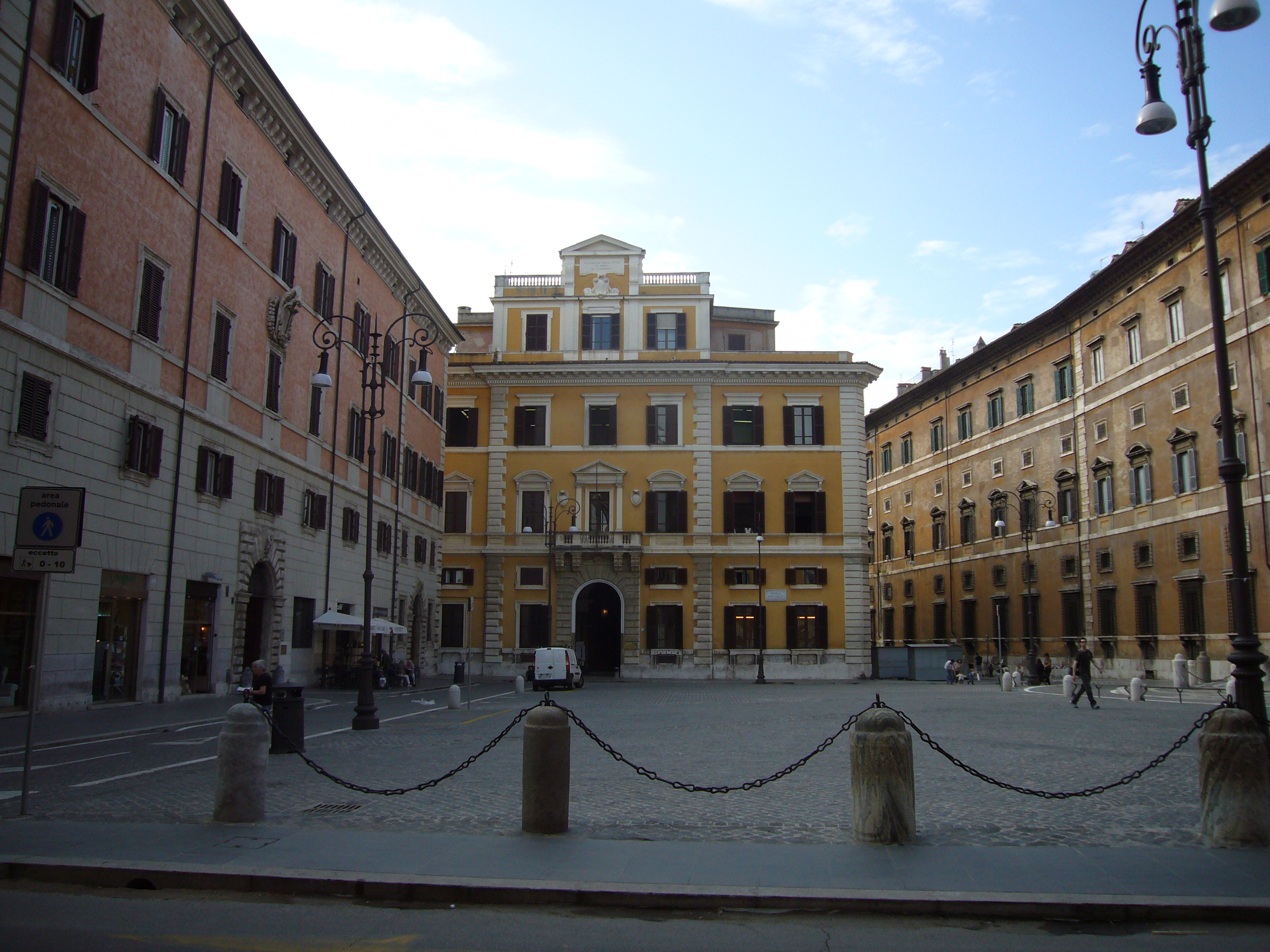
- Piazza Borghese

- Seal

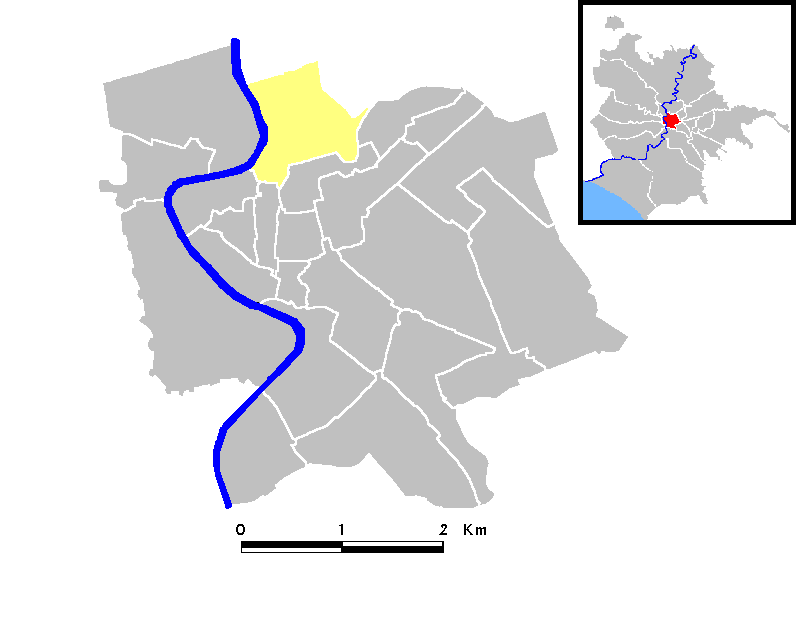
- Position of the rione within the center of the city
- Country: Italy
- Region: Lazio
- Province: Rome
- Comune: Rome
- Time zone: UTC+1 (CET)
  - Summer (DST): UTC+2 (CEST)

Campo Marzio (Italian: [ˈkampo ˈmartsjo]) is the 4th rione of Rome, Italy, identified by the initials R. IV. It belongs to the Municipio I and covers a smaller section of the area of the ancient Campus Martius. The logo of this rione is a silver crescent on a blue background.

== History ==
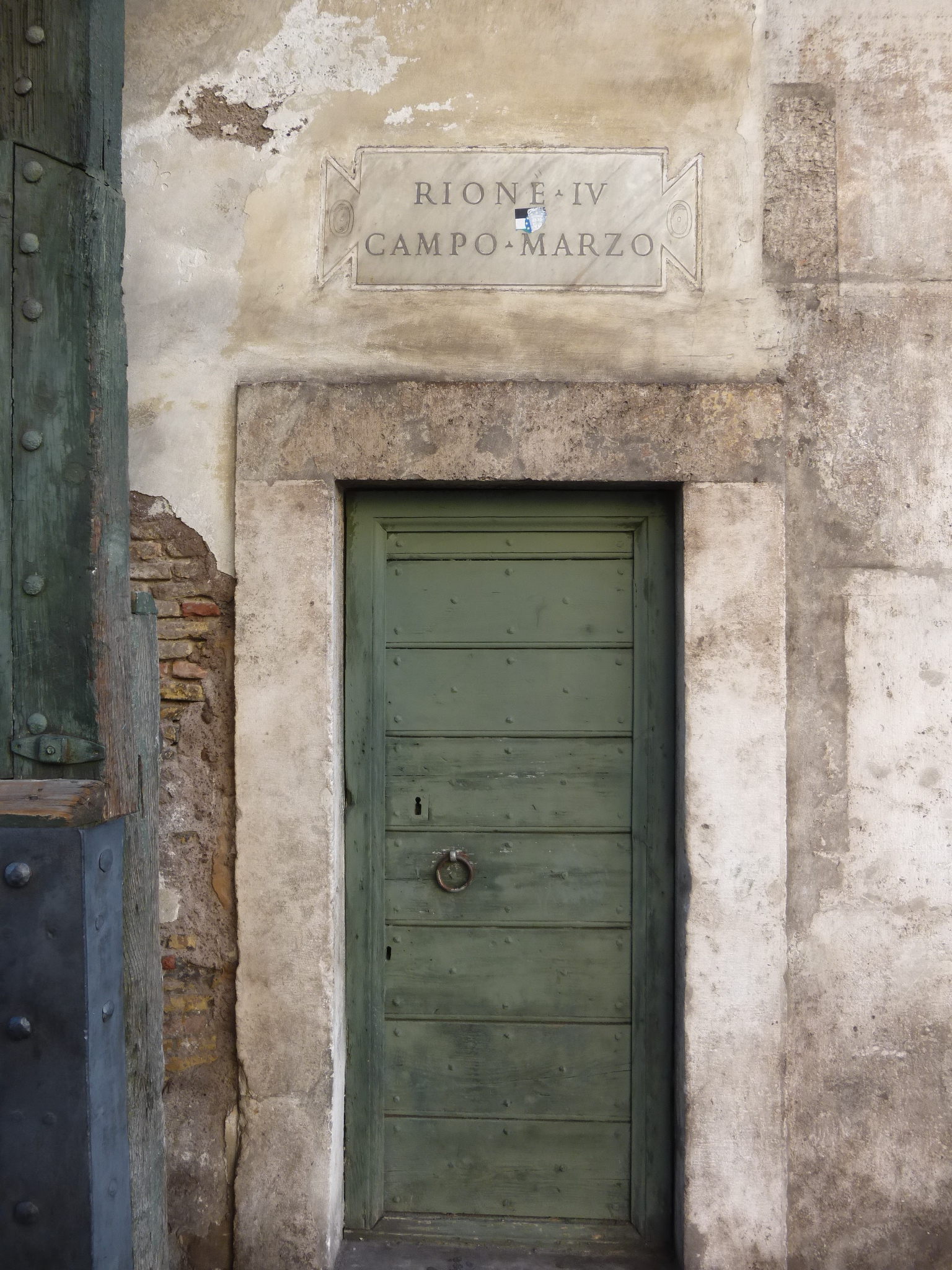
A plaque bearing the old name Campo Marzo, which was used up until 19th century: the plaque is still located above a side entrance of Porta del Popolo.

Until the domination of Napoleon, in 19th century, the rione was also known by the spelling Campo Marzo.

In the Middle Ages, after the main aqueducts of the city were ruined during the Gothic sieges in 6th century and following to the establishing of St. Peter's Basilica as a focal point for pilgrims, Campo Marzio became one of the most densely populated zones of Rome. The borough was crossed by the procession that used to accompany newly elected Popes from St. Peter's Basilica to their official residence, St. John in Lateran. Moreover, the area was also passed through by the Via Lata, one of the main arteries linking Rome to the rest of Europe, resulting from the merger of Via Cassia and Via Flaminia.

The urban pattern was quite dense, and included several monuments and a number of remains of ancient buildings. Campo Marzio experienced manifold urban renewal interventions during the Renaissance, with the construction of several churches and noble palaces. Pope Paul II redeveloped the Via Lata (the current Via del Corso), Pope Julius II promoted the construction of two straight roads on each shore of the Tiber, Via Giulia on the left shore and Via della Lungara on the right one, between Trastevere and the Vatican. Pope Leo X ordered the creation of a new road connecting Ponte Sant'Angelo to Porta del Popolo, the Via Leonina (Via di Ripetta). In 1570, Pope Pius V promoted the restoration of the Acquedotto Vergine, leading to the creation of new fountains in the area.

New works were undertaken when Rome became the new Italian capital, in 1870, first of all massive walls were built alongside the Tiber, to avoid floods, which were flanked by Lungotevere in Augusta and Lungotevere Marzio. The rione was linked to the near Prati through the construction of Ponte Regina Margherita in 1891, while in 1902 a new bridge (Ponte Cavour) was built downstream, in line with Piazza Cavour, demolishing the Porto di Ripetta.

In 1909, depending on the urban development of Prati, a large demolition project was planned in Campo Marzio, envisaging a new artery climbing down the Pincio and reaching Ponte Cavour. The plan was then modified, and in 1926 a massive refurbishment started in the area near the Mausoleum of Augustus, demolishing about 120 houses and creating a big empty space around it.

== Geography ==
=== Boundaries ===
Northward, Campo Marzio is delimited by the Aurelian Walls (alongside Via Luisa di Savoia) and by Piazzale Flaminio, that separates it from Quartiere Flaminio (Q. I). To the north, it also borders with Quartiere Pinciano (Q. III), whose border is marked by Piazzale Flaminio and by the portion of the Aurelian Walls beside Viale del Muro Torto.

Eastward, Campo Marzio borders with Ludovisi (R. XVI), from which it is separated by Via di Porta Pinciana and Via Francesco Crispi.

To the south, it borders with other 3 rioni: Colonna (R. III), from which Campo Marzio is separated by Via Francesco Crispi, Via Capo le Case, Via dei Due Macelli, Via Frattina, Piazza di San Lorenzo in Lucina and Via di Campo Marzio; Sant'Eustachio (R. VIII), whose boundary is defined by Piazza in Campo Marzio, Via della Stelletta and Via dei Portoghesi; and Ponte (R. V), the boundary being a brief stretch of Via dell'Orso and Via del Cancello, up to the Tiber.

To the west, Campo Marzio boundary is the Tiber itself, that separates it from Prati (R. XXII).

=== Local geography ===
Piazzas

- Piazza del Popolo
- Piazza di Spagna
- Piazza Nicosia

Roads

- Via Bocca di Leone
- Via Borgognona
- Via dei Condotti
- Via del Babuino
- Via del Corso
- Via della Croce
- Via de' Prefetti
- Via di Ripetta
- Via Margutta
- Via Sistina
- Via Tomacelli
- Via Vittoria
- Via Gregoriana

== Places of interest ==
=== Palaces and other buildings ===
- Accademia di belle arti di Roma, in Via di Ripetta.
- Casa di Goethe, in Via del Corso.
- Palazzo Della Porta Negroni Caffarelli, in Via dei Condotti.
- Palazzo Aragona Gonzaga, in Via della Scrofa.
- Palazzo Borghese, in Piazza Borghese.
- Palazzo Boncompagni Cerasi, in Via del Babuino
- Palazzo Capilupi, in Via de' Prefetti.
- Palazzo Corrodi, in Via Maria Adelaide.
- Palazzo Firenze, in Piazza di Firenze.
- Palazzo Gabrielli-Mignanelli, in Piazza Mignanelli.
- Palazzo Incontro, in Via de' Prefetti.
- Palazzo Malta or Palazzo Magistrale, in Via dei Condotti.
- Palazzo Nainer, in Via del Babuino.
- Palazzo Rondinini, in Via del Corso.
- Palazzo Ruspoli, in Via del Corso.
- Palazzo dell'Unione Militare, in Via Tomacelli.
- Palazzetto Zuccari, in Via Sistina, near Via Gregoriana, and Piazza della Trinità dei Monti.
- Villa Medici, in Viale della Trinità dei Monti.

=== Archaeological sites ===
- Ara Pacis
- Mausoleum of Augustus
- Amphitheater of Statilius Taurus

=== Churches ===
- Santa Maria del Popolo
- Santa Maria dei Miracoli
- Santa Maria in Montesanto
- Trinità dei Monti
- San Rocco all'Augusteo
- Santi Ambrogio e Carlo al Corso
- Gesù e Maria
- San Girolamo dei Croati
- Sant'Antonio in Campo Marzio
- Santa Lucia della Tinta
- Santa Maria della Concezione in Campo Marzio
- Santa Maria Portae Paradisi
- Sant'Ivo dei Bretoni
- San Gregorio Nazianzeno
- San Nicola dei Prefetti
- Sant'Atanasio
- Santissima Trinità degli Spagnoli
- San Giacomo in Augusta
- Resurrezione di Nostro Signore Gesù Cristo
- San Gregorio dei Muratori
- San Giorgio e Martiri Inglesi
- All Saints' Church
- Rome Baptist Church
