= Girolamo Gastaldi =

Italian Roman Catholic cardinal (1616–1685)

His Eminence Girolamo Gastaldi
- Cardinal-Priest of Sant'Anastasia; Archbishop of Benevento
- Church: Catholic Church

Orders
- Consecration: 12 May 1680 by Girolamo Boncompagni

Personal details
- Born: 1616 Taggia, Italy
- Died: 8 Apr 1685 (age 69)

Girolamo Gastaldi (1616–1685) was a Roman Catholic cardinal. He is notable for commissioning the "twin" churches of Santa Maria dei Miracoli and Santa Maria in Montesanto in Rome.

== Biography ==
On 12 May 1680, was consecrated bishop by Girolamo Boncompagni, Archbishop of Bologna, with Carlo Molza, Bishop of Modena, and Augusto Bellincini, Bishop of Reggio Emilia, serving as co-consecrators.

He is known for his treatise on the political and legal measures taken to control the plague, Tractatus de Avertenda et Profliganda Peste, Politico-Legalis, published in 1656.

== External links and additional sources ==
- Cheney, David M. "Archdiocese of Benevento". Catholic-Hierarchy.org. (for Chronology of Bishops) ^{[self-published]}
- Chow, Gabriel. "Archdiocese of Benevento (Italy)". GCatholic.org. (for Chronology of Bishops) ^{[self-published]}

Catholic Church titles
Preceded by Gasparo Carpegna	Cardinal-Priest of Santa Pudenziana; 1673–1677	Succeeded by Federico Caccia
Preceded by Camillo Massimi	Cardinal-Priest of Sant'Anastasia; 1677–1685	Succeeded by Federico Baldeschi Colonna
Preceded by Giuseppe Bologna	Archbishop of Benevento; 1680–1685	Succeeded by Pietro Francesco Orsini de Gravina
