= Tridente, Rome =

Area of the historic centre of Rome, Italy

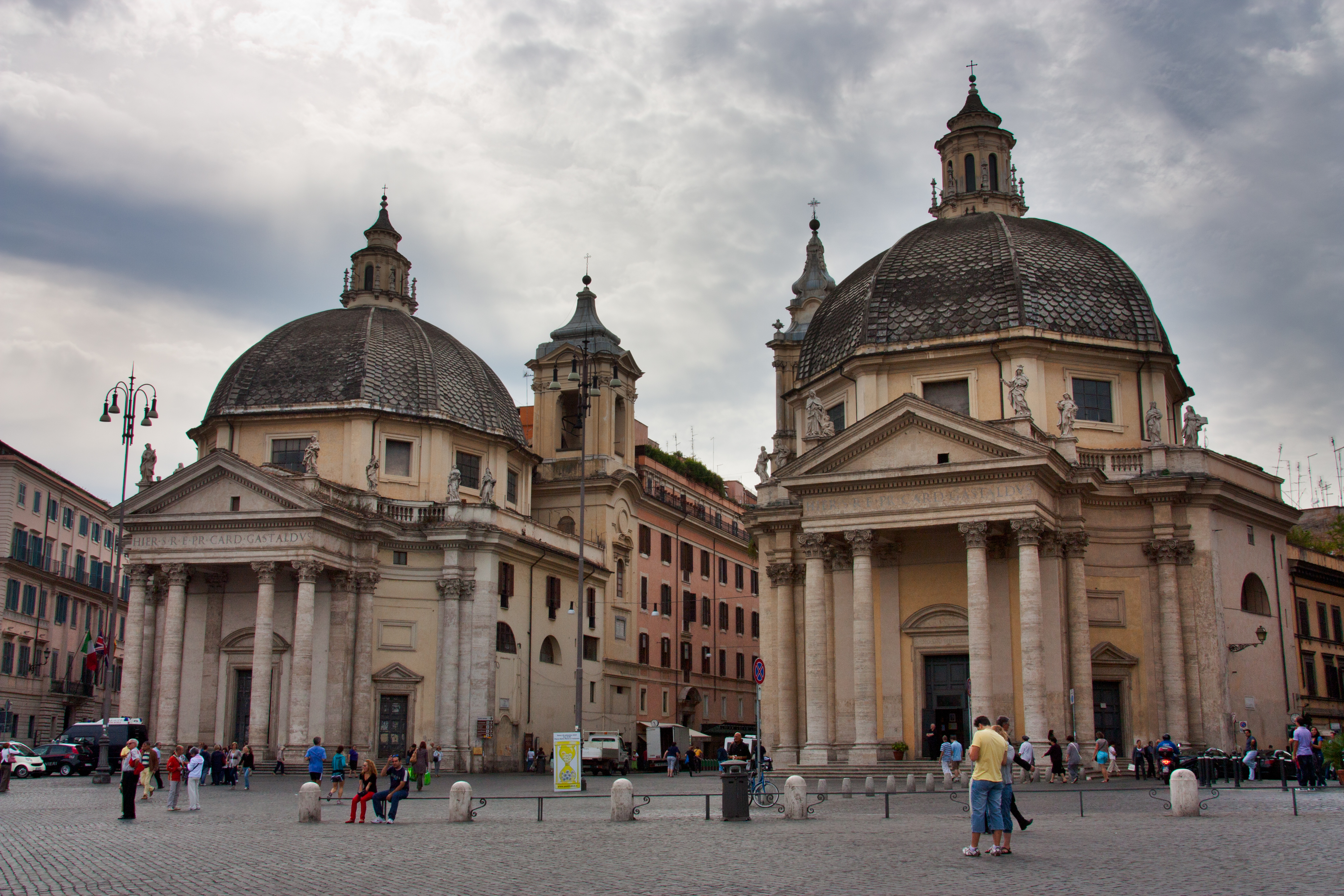
The churches of Santa Maria dei Miracoli and Santa Maria in Montesanto in Piazza del Popolo: on the left, Via del Babuino; in the middle, Via del Corso; on the right, Via di Ripetta

The Tridente (Italian for Trident) is the complex of roads formed by three straight streets of Rome (Italy), departing from Piazza del Popolo and diverging southward, taking the shape of a trident.

== Description ==
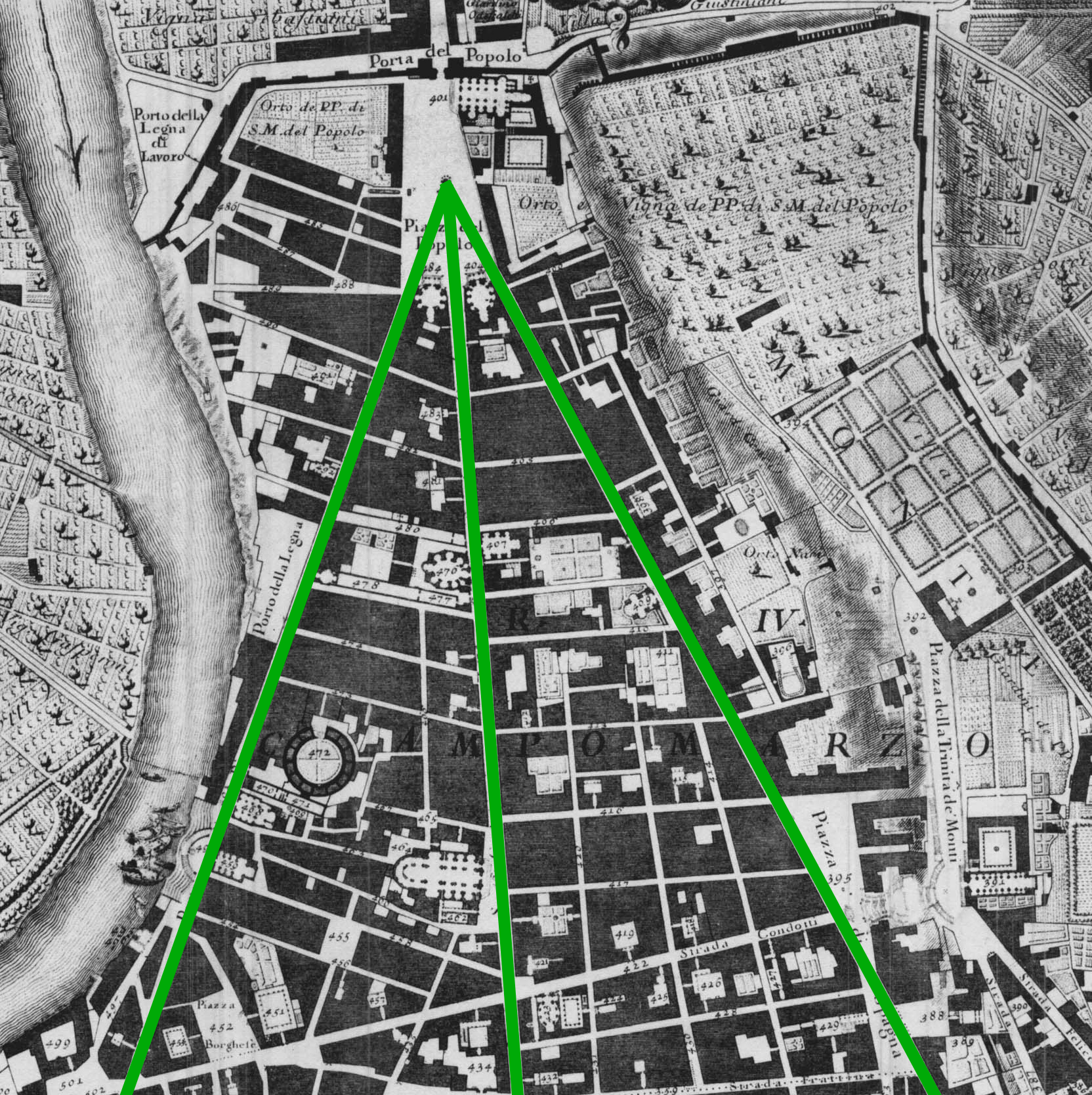
The Tridente inside Campus Martius

The street complex of the Tridente originates from an important city planning project released between 15th and 17th century, which reorganized the three streets that, starting from the main gateway of Rome, Porta del Popolo, conveyed the traffic towards the major basilicas:

- Via di Ripetta towards Ponte Sant'Angelo and St. Peter's Basilica;
- Via del Corso (formerly named Via Lata, an ancient lengthening of Via Flaminia), which, through Campus Martius, reached the papal palace of Piazza Venezia and went ahead towards St. John Lateran;
- Via del Babuino (formerly Via Clementina), which, through Piazza di Spagna climbed to the Basilica di Santa Maria Maggiore.

Presently at the far end of the three streets forming the Tridente are respectively:

- Piazza Cardelli and Via della Scrofa, at the end of Via di Ripetta;
- Piazza Venezia, at the end of Via del Corso;
- Piazza di Spagna, at the end of Via del Babuino.

== Bibliography ==
- Rendina, Claudio (2005). Enciclopedia di Roma. Rome: Newton Compton. ISBN 88-541-0304-7.
