= Piazza del Popolo =

Urban square in Rome, Italy

- City square
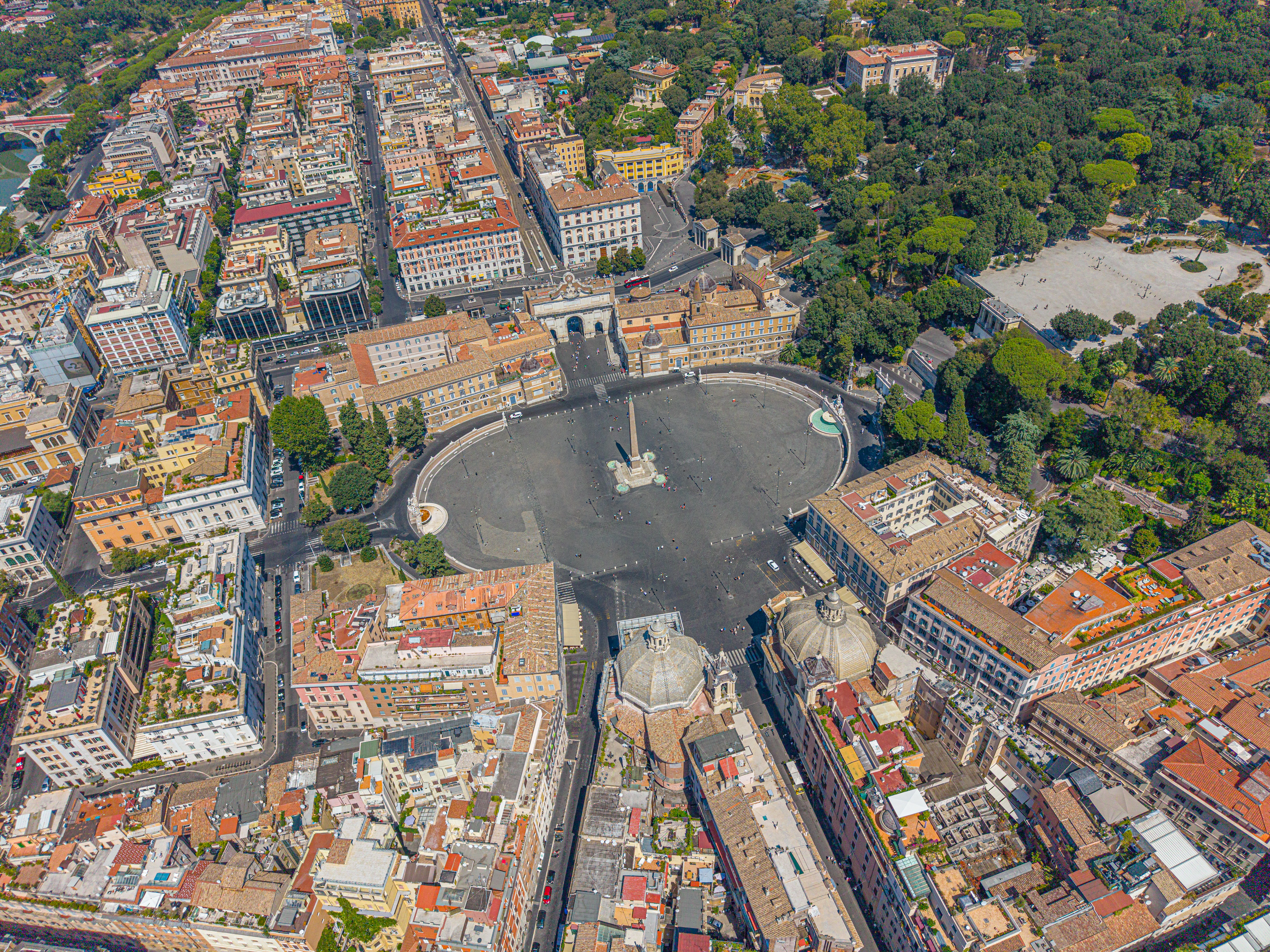
- The Piazza del Popolo.
- Location: Rome, Italy
- Interactive map of Piazza del Popolo
- Coordinates: 41°54′39″N 12°28′35″E

Piazza del Popolo is a large urban square in Rome. The name in modern Italian literally means "People's Square", but historically it derives from the poplars (populus in Latin, pioppo in Italian) after which the church of Santa Maria del Popolo, in the northeast corner of the piazza, takes its name.

The piazza lies inside the northern gate in the Aurelian Walls, once the Porta Flaminia of ancient Rome, and now called the Porta del Popolo. This was the starting point of the Via Flaminia, the road to Ariminum (modern-day Rimini) and the most important route to the north. At the same time, before the age of railroads, it was the traveller's first view of Rome upon arrival. For centuries, the Piazza del Popolo was a place for public executions, the last of which took place in 1826.

== Valadier's design ==
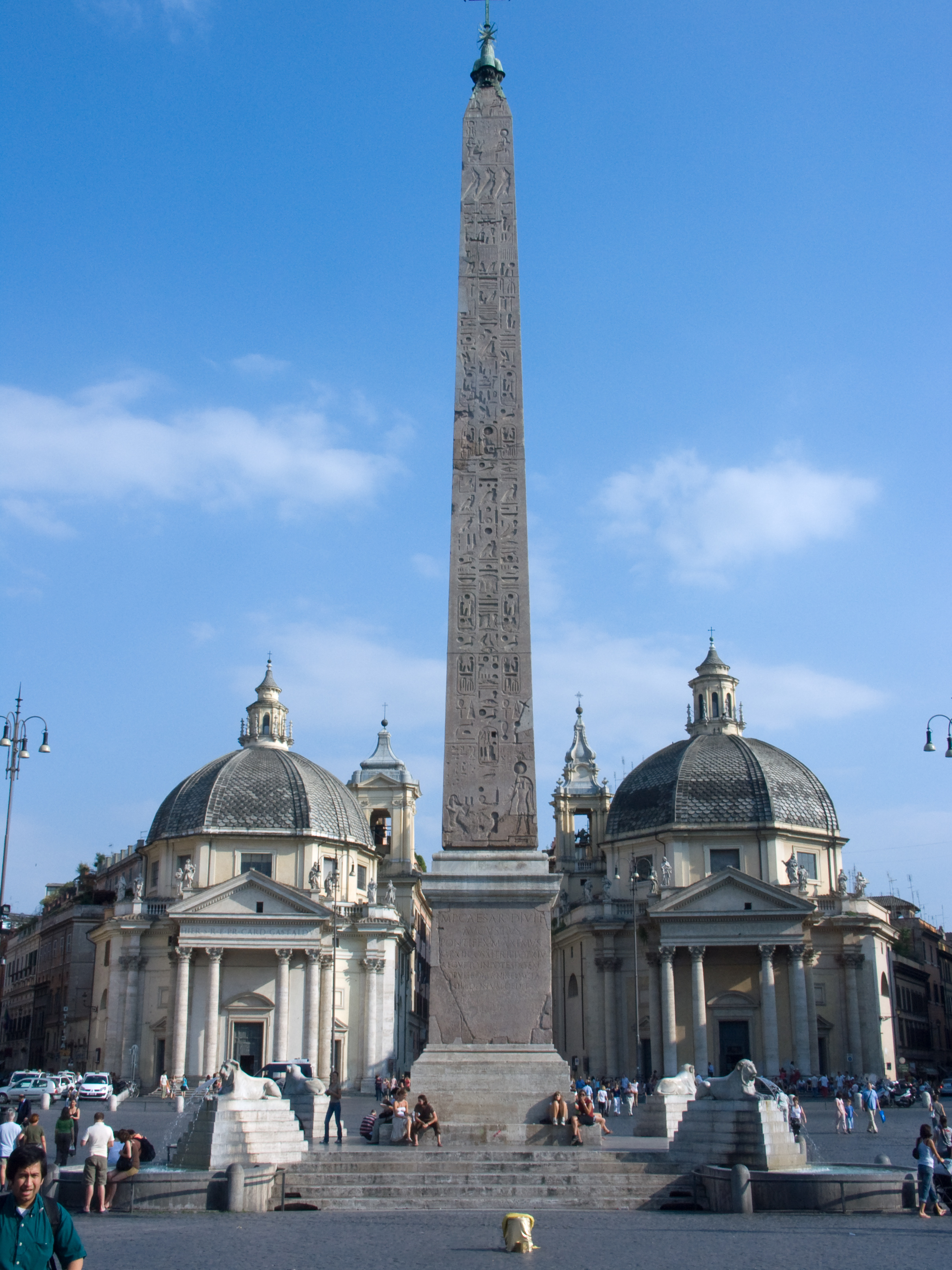
An Egyptian obelisk of Ramesses II from Heliopolis stands in the centre of the Piazza.

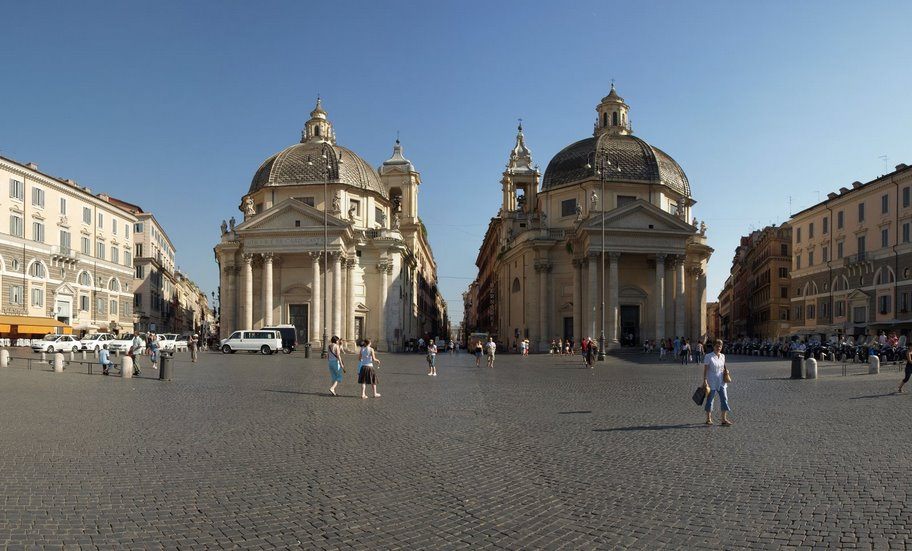
The entrance of the Tridente from Piazza del Popolo, defined by the "twin" churches of Santa Maria in Montesanto (left, built 1662–75) and Santa Maria dei Miracoli (right, built 1675–79). The Via del Corso exits between the two churches.

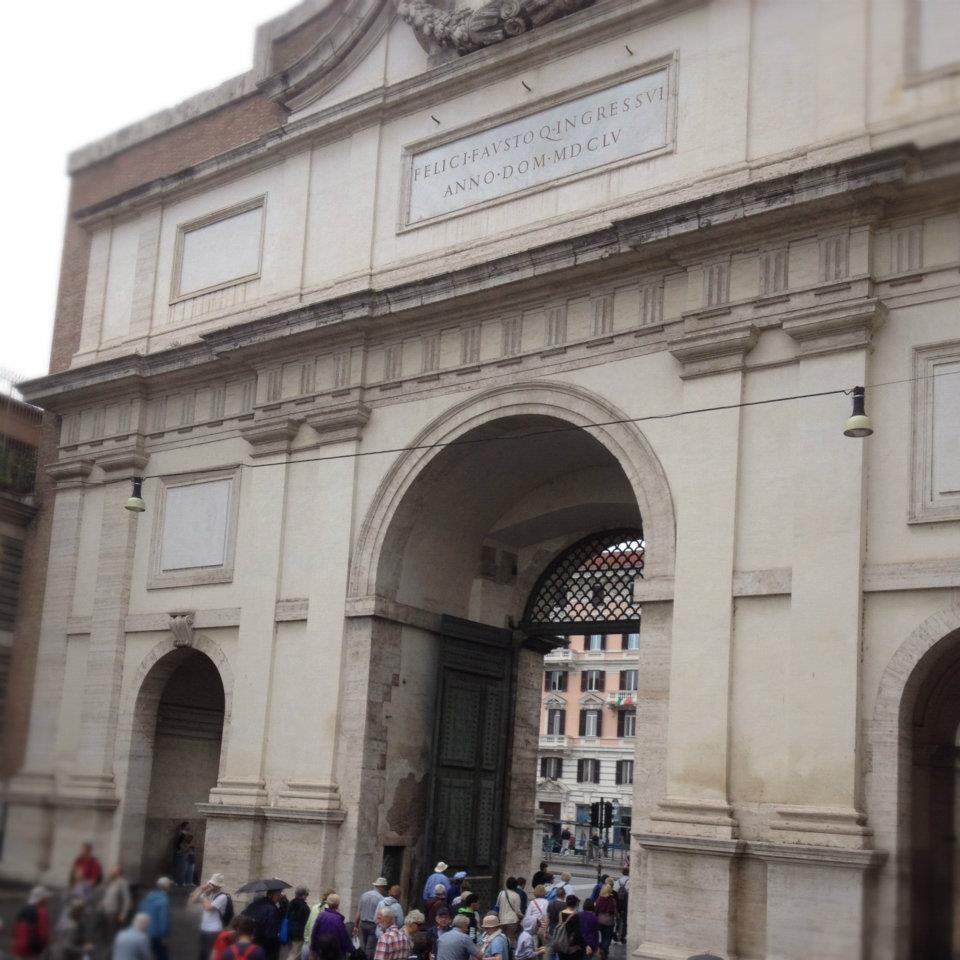
Porta del Popolo

The layout of the piazza today was designed in neoclassical style between 1811 and 1822 by the architect Giuseppe Valadier, He removed a modest fountain by Giacomo Della Porta, erected in 1572, and demolished some insignificant buildings and haphazard high screening walls to form two semicircles, reminiscent of Bernini's plan for St. Peter's Square, replacing the original cramped trapezoidal square centred on the Via Flaminia.

Valadier's Piazza del Popolo, however, incorporated the verdure of trees as an essential element; he conceived his space in a third dimension, expressed in the building of the viale that leads up to the balustraded overlook from the Pincio (above, right).

An Egyptian obelisk of Sety I (later erected by Rameses II) from Heliopolis stands in the centre of the Piazza. Three sides of the obelisk were carved during the reign of Sety I and the fourth side, under Rameses II. The obelisk, known as the Flaminio Obelisk or the Popolo Obelisk, is the second-oldest and one of the tallest obelisks in Rome (some 24 m high, or 36 m including its plinth). The obelisk was brought to Rome in 1 BC by order of Augustus and originally set up in the Circus Maximus. It was re-erected here in the piazza by the architect-engineer Domenico Fontana in 1589 as part of the urban plan of Sixtus V. The piazza also formerly contained a central fountain, which was moved to the Piazza Nicosia in 1818, when a new fountain called the Fontana dei Leoni, in the form of four Egyptian-style lions, was added around the base of the obelisk.

Looking from the north (illustration, right), three streets branch out from the piazza into the city, forming the so-called "trident" (il Tridente): the Via del Corso in the centre; the Via del Babuino to the left (opened in 1525 as the Via Paolina) and the Via di Ripetta (opened by Leo X in 1518 as the Via Leonina) to the right. The twin churches (the chiese gemelle) of Santa Maria dei Miracoli (1681) and Santa Maria in Montesanto (1679), begun by Carlo Rainaldi and completed by Bernini and Carlo Fontana, define the junctions of the roads. Close scrutiny of the twin churches reveals that they are not mere copies of one another, as they would have been in a Neoclassical project, but vary in their details, offering variety within their symmetrical balance in Baroque fashion.

The central street, now known as the Via del Corso, was the ancient Via Lata, and to the north it links with the ancient Roman road, the Via Flaminia, beyond the city gate and southwards, to the Piazza Venezia (formerly the Piazza San Marco), the Capitol and the forum. The Via di Ripetta leads past the Mausoleum of Augustus to the River Tiber, where the Baroque riverside landing called the Porto di Ripetta was located until it was destroyed in the late 19th century. The Via del Babuino ("Baboon"), linking to Piazza di Spagna, takes its name from a grotesque sculpture of Silenus that gained the popular name of "the Baboon".

To the north of the piazza stands the Porta del Popolo, beyond which lies the Piazzale Flaminio and the start of the Via Flaminia. The gateway was reworked to give its current appearance by Bernini for Pope Alexander VII in 1655, to welcome Queen Christina of Sweden to Rome following her conversion to Roman Catholicism and her abdication. Opposite Santa Maria del Popolo stands a Carabinieri station, with a dome reflecting that of the church.

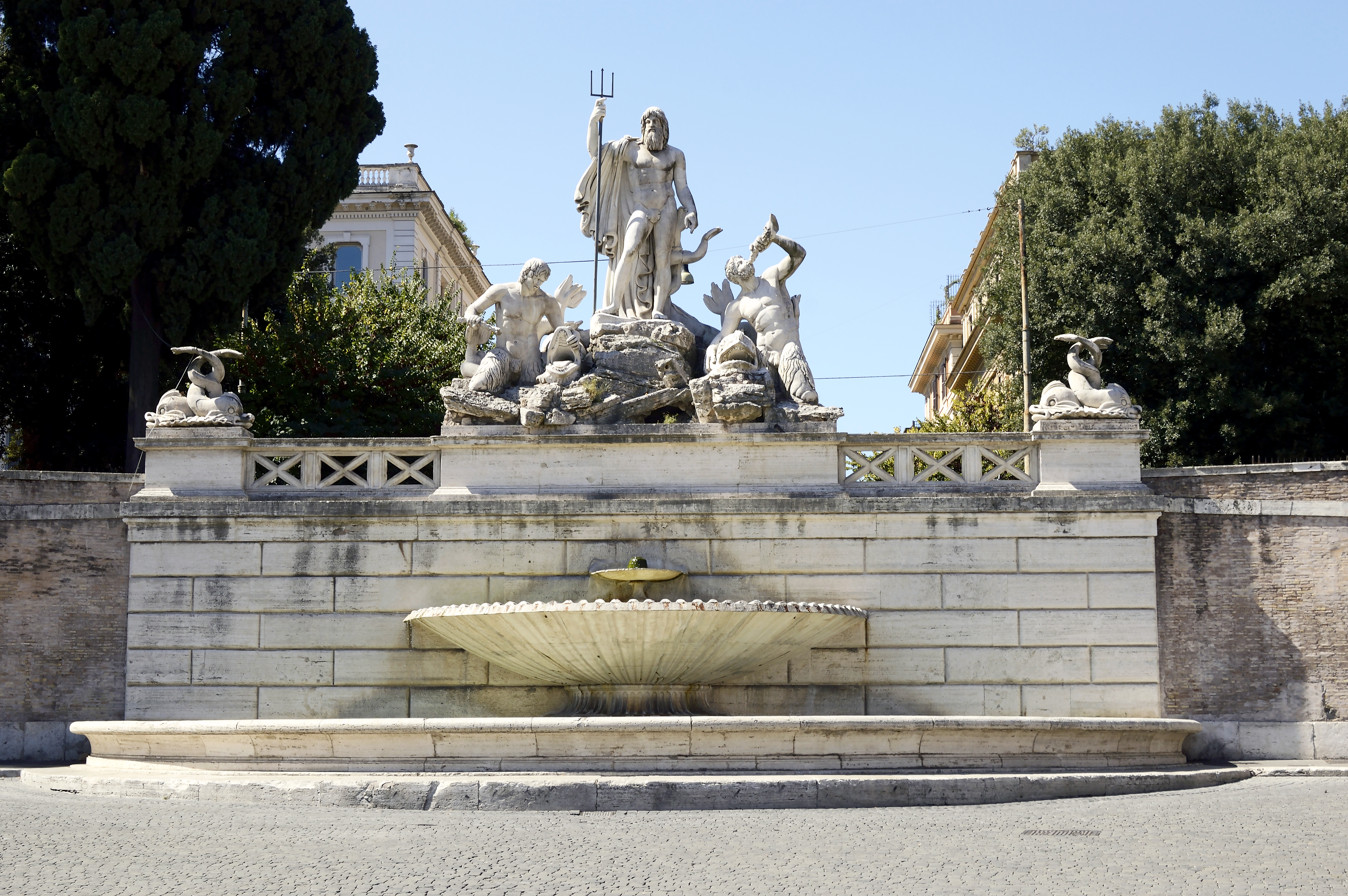
Fontana del Nettuno

In his urbanistic project, Valadier constructed the matching palazzi that provide a frame for the scenography of the twin churches and hold down two corners of his composition. He positioned a third palazzo to face these and matched a low structure screening the flank of Santa Maria del Popolo, with its fine Early Renaissance façade, together holding down the two northern corners. Valadier outlined this newly defined oval forecourt to the city of Rome with identical sweeps of wall, forming curving exedra-like spaces. Behind the western one, a screen of trees masks the unassorted fronts of buildings beyond.

=== Fountains ===
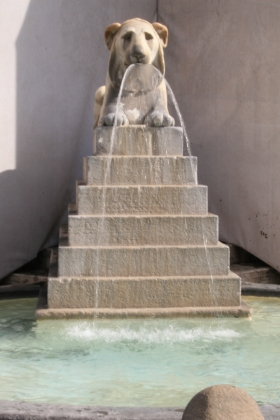
One side of the Fontana dell'Obelisco

The aqueduct carrying the Acqua Vergine Nuovo was completed in the 1820s, and its water provided the opportunity for fountains and their basins that offered the usual public water supply for the rione or urban district. Ever since the Renaissance such terminal fountains also provided an occasion for the grand terminal water show called in Rome a mostra or a show. "What makes a fountain a mostra is not essentially its size or splendor, but its specific designation as the fountain that is a public memorial to the whole achievement of the aqueduct." Valadier had planned fountains in the upper tier of the Pincio slope, but these were not carried out, in part for lack of water.

Fountains by Giovanni Ceccarini (1822–23), with matching compositions of a central figure flanked by two attendant figures, stand on each side of the piazza to the east and west, flanked by neoclassical statues of The Seasons (1828). The Fontana del Nettuno (Fountain of Neptune) stands on the west side, Neptune with his trident is accompanied by two tritons. Rome between the Tiber and the Aniene on the east side, against the steep slope of the Pincio, represents the terminal mostra of the aqueduct. Dea Roma armed with lance and helmet, and in front is the she-wolf feeding Romulus and Remus.

At the center of the piazza is the Fontana dell' Obelisco or Fontana dei Leoni: a group of four mini fountains, each comprising a lion on a stepped plinth, surround the obelisk.

== Urbanisation in three dimensions ==
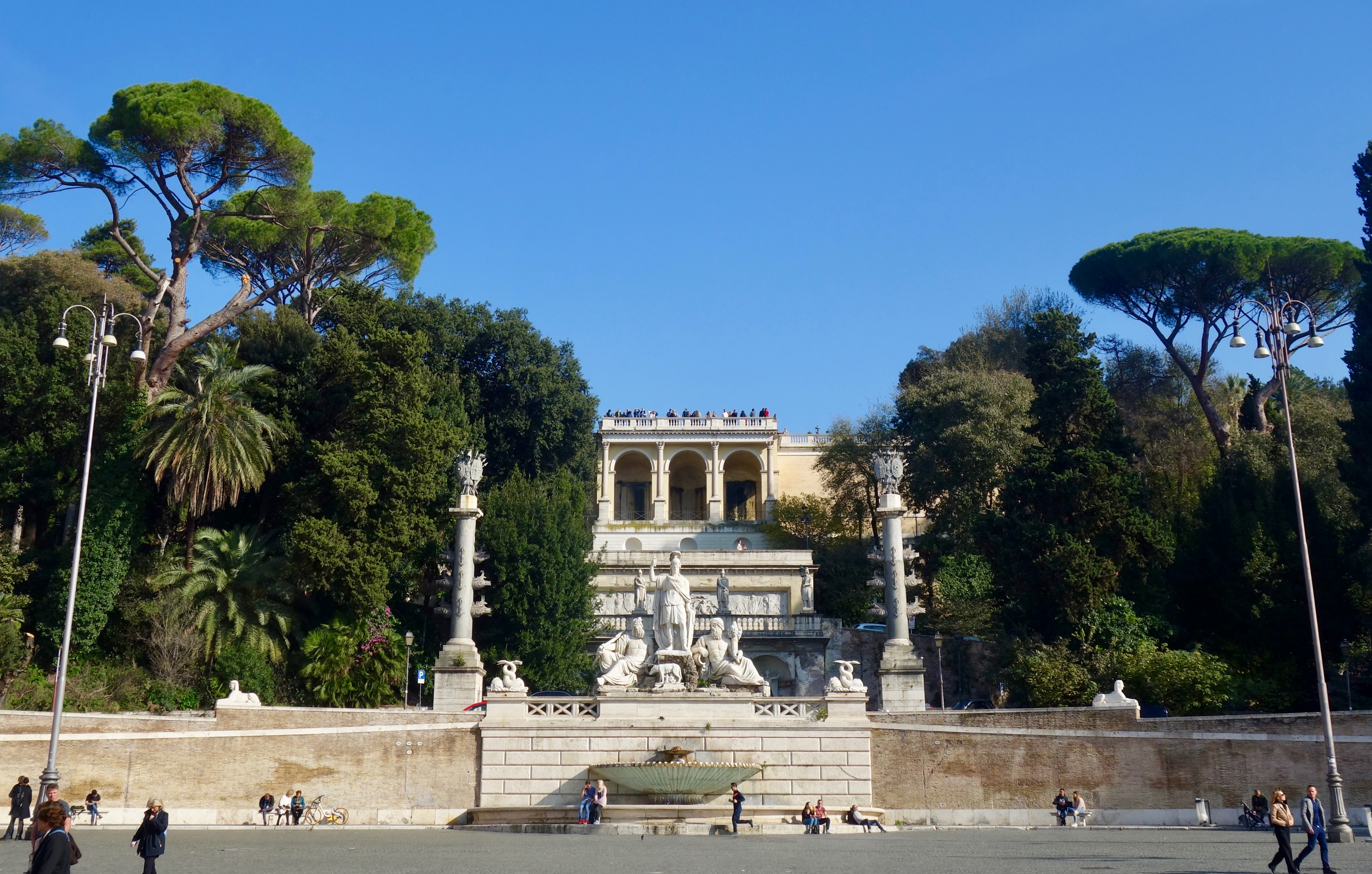
From Piazza del Popolo, the steps lead to the Pincio, to the east.

Valadier's masterstroke was in linking the piazza with the heights of the Pincio, the Pincian Hill of ancient Rome, which overlooked the space from the east. He swept away informally terraced gardens that belonged to the Augustinian monastery connected with Santa Maria del Popolo. In its place he created a carriage drive that doubled back upon itself and pedestrian steps leading up beside a waterfall to the Pincio park, where a balustraded lookout, supported by a triple-arched nymphaeum is backed by a wide gravelled opening set on axis with the piazza below; formally planted bosquets of trees flank the open space. The planted Pincio in turn provides a link to the Villa Borghese gardens.

Before its restoration and conversion into a pedestrian zone in 1997–1998, the Piazza del Popolo was often choked with traffic and parked cars.

== See also ==
- Via Margutta

== Notes ==
Preceded by Piazza d'Aracoeli	Landmarks of Rome; Piazza del Popolo	Succeeded by Piazza della Minerva
