= Santa Maria dei Miracoli and Santa Maria in Montesanto =

Roman Catholic churches, a landmark of Rome, Italy

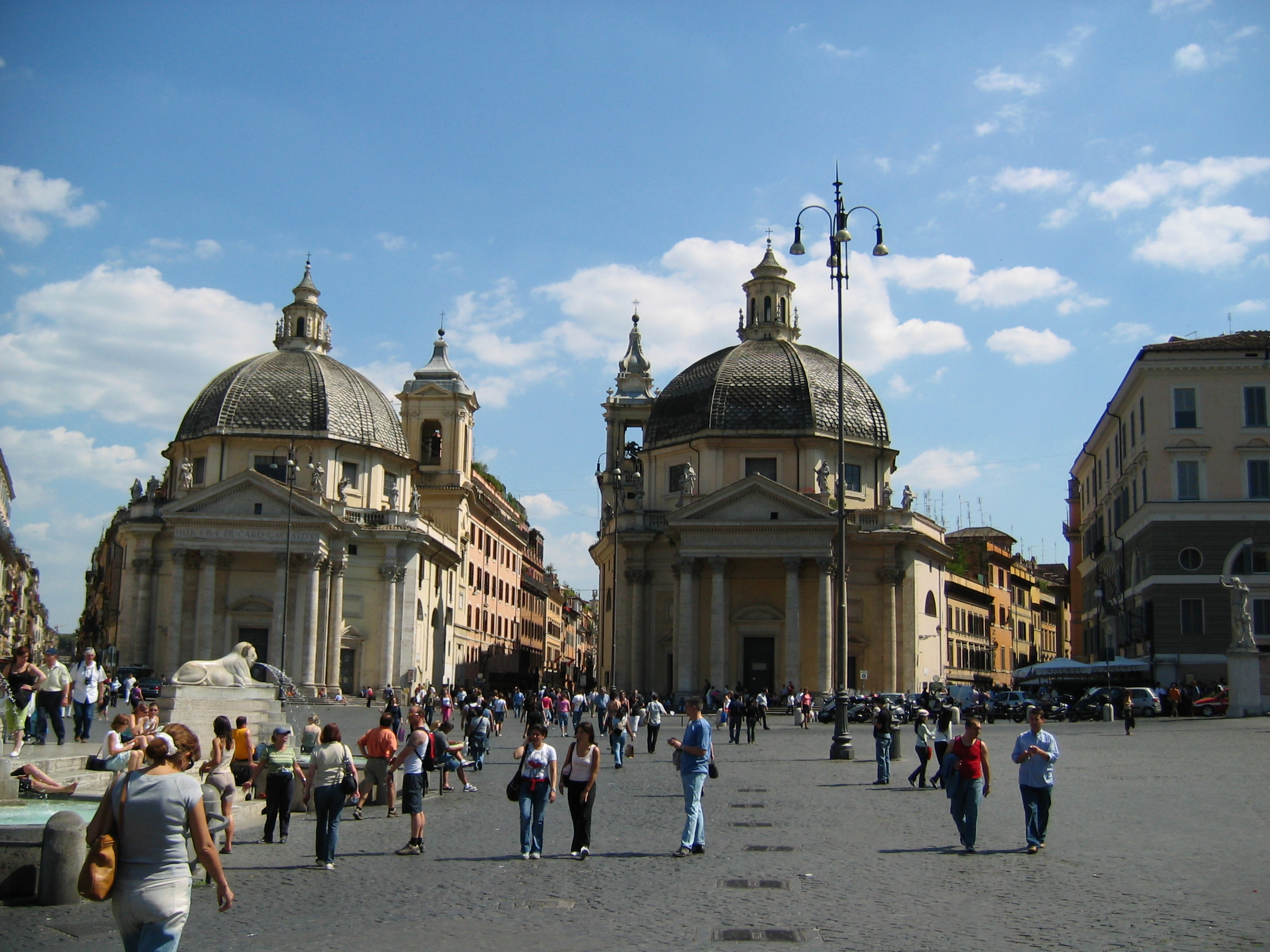
The "twin" churches of Santa Maria di Montesanto (left) and Santa Maria dei Miracoli (right), seen from Piazza del Popolo. Between the two churches Via del Corso starts. Although very similar, differences can be seen in this image in the two small belfries and in the two domes (noticeable from the number of windows in the tympanum of each church).

Santa Maria dei Miracoli and Santa Maria di Montesanto are two churches in Rome.

They are located on the Piazza del Popolo, facing the northern gate of the Aurelian Walls, at the entrance of Via del Corso on the square. The churches are often cited as "twin", due to their similar external appearance: they have indeed some differences, in both plan and exterior details.

Looking from the square, the two churches define the so-called "trident" of streets departing from Piazza del Popolo: starting from the left, Via del Babuino, Via del Corso and Via di Ripetta. The first two are separated by Santa Maria in Montesanto, the latter by Santa Maria dei Miracoli.

The origin of the two churches traces back to the 17th-century restoration of what was the main entrance to the Middle Ages and Renaissance Rome, from the Via Flaminia (known as Via Lata and Via del Corso in its urban trait). Pope Alexander VII commissioned the monumental design of the entrance of Via del Corso to architect Carlo Rainaldi. This included two churches with central plans, but the different shapes of the two areas available forced deep modifications to the projects.

Both were financed by cardinal Girolamo Gastaldi, whose crest is present in the two churches.

== Santa Maria dei Miracoli ==
Santa Maria dei Miracoli
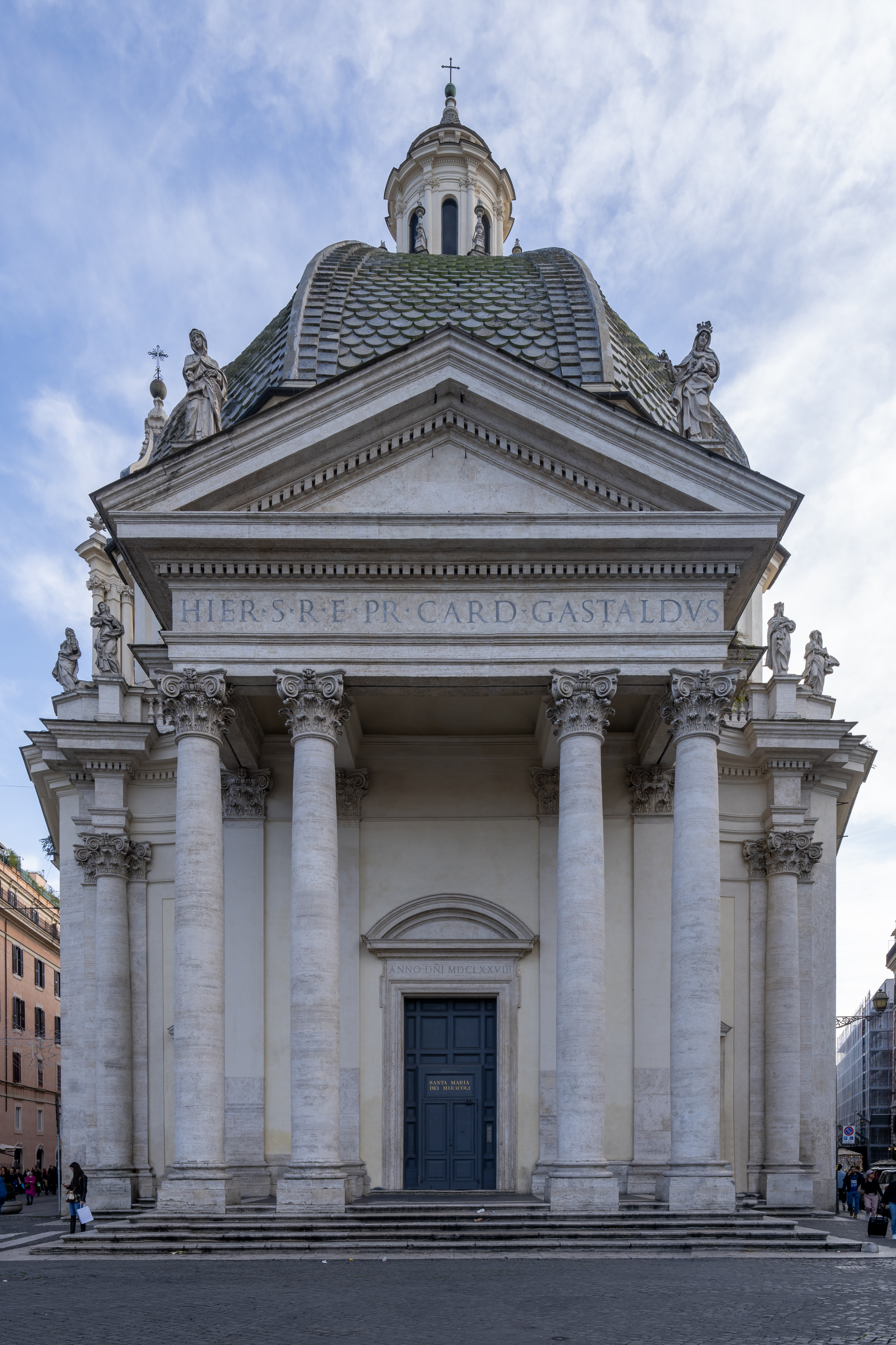
- Click on the map for a fullscreen view
- 41°54′35″N 12°28′35″E
- Location: Piazza del Popolo, Rome
- Country: Italy
- Denomination: Catholic Church

Architecture
- Architectural type: Church
- Groundbreaking: 1675
- Completed: 1681

Santa Maria dei Miracoli was begun in 1675 and finished in 1681. With a circular plan, it has an elegant 18th-century bell tower by Girolamo Theodoli and an octagonal cupola. The interior has a rich stucco decoration by Antonio Raggi, Bernini's pupil. The monuments for Cardinals Benedetto and Gastaldi were designed by Carlo Fontana, who also provided design for the cupola and the lamp. The busts in bronze were completed by Girolamo Lucenti.

At the high altar is the miraculous image of the Virgin which has given the church its name. The first chapel on the right-hand side has an altar dedicated to Our Lady of Bétharram, named after a shrine near Lourdes. The Society of Priests of the Sacred Heart was founded at Bétharram. There is a reproduction of Renoir's Madonna at Bétharram.

== Santa Maria in Montesanto ==
Santa Maria in Montesanto, erected over a church with the same name that lay at the beginning of Via del Babuino, was occupied by Carmelite friars. The name Montesanto (Holy Mountain) referred to Mount Carmel in Israel. The construction of the present church was begun on July 15, 1662, under the patronage of Cardinal Girolamo Gastaldi, and finished in 1675, with other additions by 1679. Originally designed by Carlo Rainaldi, the plans were revised by Gian Lorenzo Bernini, and ultimately completed by Carlo Fontana. A belfry was added in the 18th century. The statues of saints on the exterior have been attributed to Bernini's design. The interior has an elliptical plan, with a dodecagonal cupola. In 1825, the church was made a minor basilica.

On August 10, 1904, Angelo Giuseppe Roncalli, the future Pope John XXIII, was ordained to the priesthood by Patriarch Giuseppe Ceppetelli in this church. In 1953, Monsignor Ennio Francia established the tradition of the Mass of the Artists. On the last Sunday of October until June 29, a mass is held every Sunday with a reading by an artist, and animated by music. At the end of the mass, a prayer for the artists is read. For these reasons the Montesanto church is also called the Church of the Artists.

=== Interior decoration ===
The first chapel to the left is the cappella di Santa Lucia (Saint Lucy). The second chapel is dedicated to Santa Maria Magdalena de Pazzi, designed by Carlo Rainaldi to honor the Carmelite nun canonized by Pope Clemente XI in 1669. The ceiling and the altarpiece of the Miracle of the saint (c. 1685) was painted by Ludovico Gimignani.

The third chapel is the cappella Montioni. The Monitoni family commissioned the design by Tommaso Mattei, pupil of Carlo Fontana. The altarpiece of the Madonna with Child and Saints Francis and Jacob (c. 1687) was completed by Carlo Maratta. The Assumption fresco was painted by Giuseppe Bartolomeo Chiari. Upon the altar is a modern statue of the Angel for the artists by Guelfo (1937–1997). At one time, the sacristy held frescoes by Baciccia.

The presbytery is stuccoed with angels by Filippo Carcani and houses the miraculous 15th-century altarpiece of Virgin of Montesanto, which tradition holds was painted by an 11-year-old girl. The sacristy has a frescoed vault with angels and the instruments of passion, the altarpiece of the Deposition (c. 1600) is attributed to Biagio Puccini.

== See also ==
- Roman Catholic Marian churches
- 17th-century Western domes
- Symbolism of domes

Preceded by Santa Maria degli Angeli e dei Martiri	Landmarks of Rome; Santa Maria dei Miracoli and Santa Maria in Montesanto	Succeeded by Santa Maria in Cosmedin
