= Carlo Fontana =

Italian architect (1634/1638–1714)

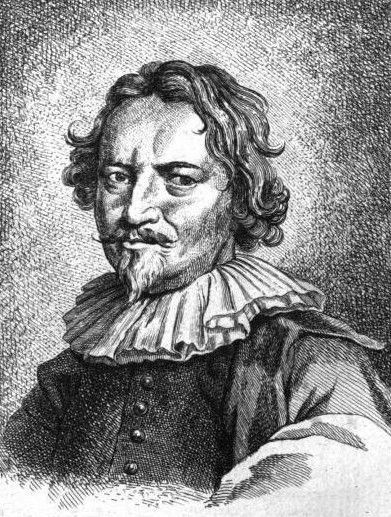
- Carlo Fontana
- Born: 22 April 1638; Brusato, near Como, Duchy of Milan
- Died: 5 February 1714 (aged 75); Rome, Papal States
- Notable work: Façade of San Marcello al Corso (1682–83); Cybo Chapel (1687); Palazzo Montecitorio (1694–97)
- Movement: Baroque style
- Patron: Cardinal Scipione Borghese

Carlo Fontana (22 April 1638 – 5 February 1714) was an Italian architect originating from today's Canton Ticino. He was partly responsible for the classicizing direction taken by Late Baroque Roman architecture.

== Biography ==
There seems to be no proof that he belonged to the family of famous architects of the same name, which included Domenico Fontana, although he is sometimes called his great-nephew.

Born in Brusato, near Como (now part of the town of Novazzano in Canton Ticino, Switzerland), Fontana went to Rome before 1655. He became a draughtsman for the architectural plans of Pietro da Cortona, Carlo Rainaldi, and Gian Lorenzo Bernini. Bernini employed him for nearly a decade in diverse projects. He finished Bernini's Palazzo Ludovisi, which had been started for Cardinal Ludovico Ludovisi, nephew of Pope Gregory XV; and modified Bernini's plan with the addition of a bell gable above the main entrance.

His first independent project may be the church of San Biagio in Campitelli, completed by 1665. After a fire during the night of Good Friday in 1670 destroyed the roof and part of the interior of the Basilica Cattedrale di Santa Margherita in Montefiascone, the repair and completion of the construction was entrusted to Fontana. Around that time, he also designed the Ginetti Chapel in Sant'Andrea della Valle.

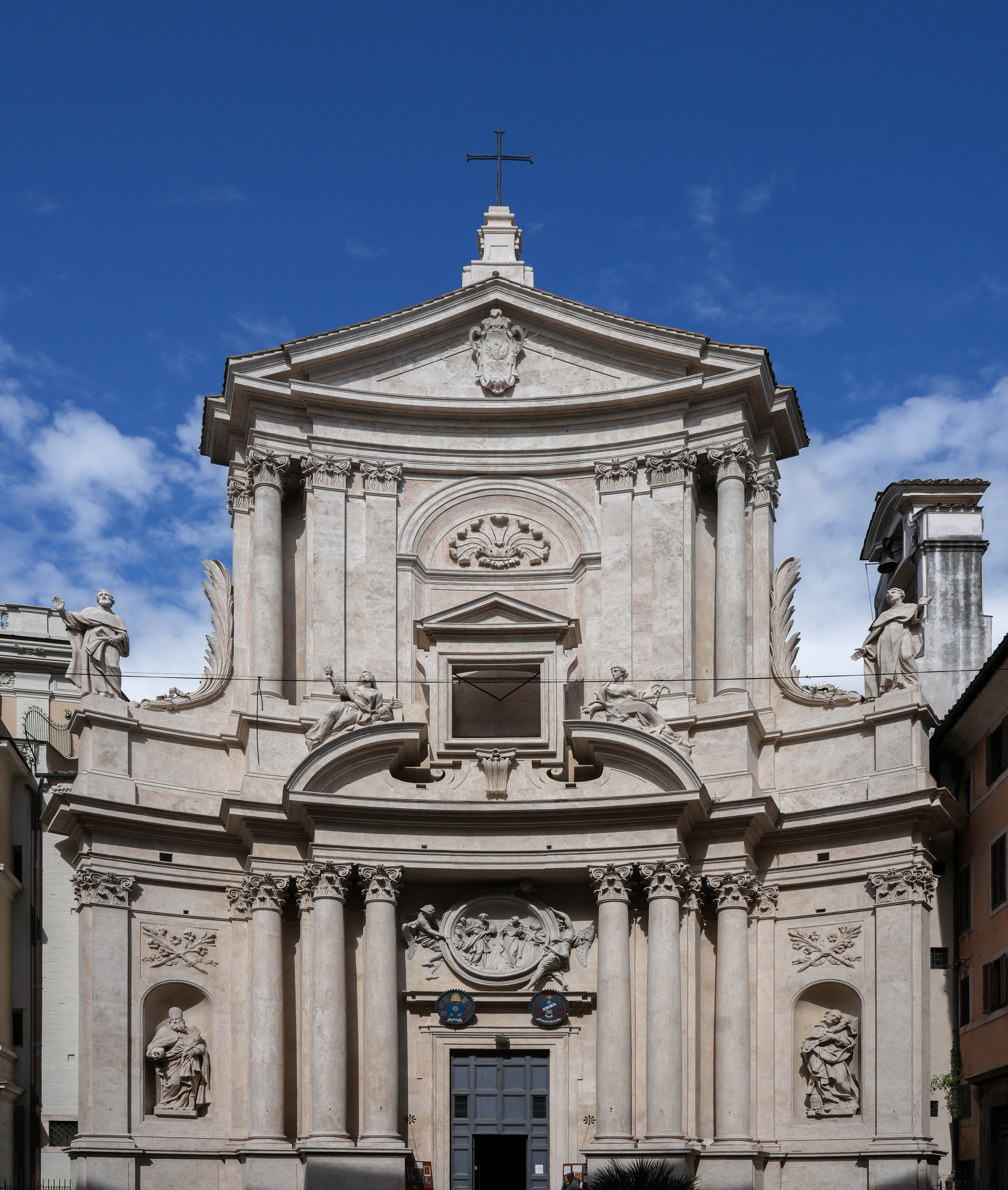
San Marcello al Corso, by Carlo Fontana, 1682–83

The façade at San Marcello al Corso (1682–83) is described as one of his most successful works. Around 1700, he and his son Francesco designed a new Baroque interior for Santi Apostoli. Innocent XII commissioned Fontana to extend the Ospizio Apostolico di San Michele complex, organized around its church. The first chapel in the south aisle of St. Peter's Basilica is the baptistry, commissioned by Pope Innocent XII and designed by Fontana.

At the request of Clement XI he built the public oil depots (Olearie Papali) within the ruins of the Baths of Diocletian He also built a new granary.

In 1702 Fontana restored the façade of Santa Maria in Trastevere, replacing the ancient porch with a sloping tiled roof. He also restored the octagonal fountain in the piazza in front of the church in the Piazza di Santa Maria in Trastevere. In 1708 he designed the Biblioteca Casanatense at Santa Maria sopra Minerva.

Fontana mainly worked in Rome, assisted by his nephews Girolamo and Francesco Fontana (1668–1708), but he sent a model for the Fulda Cathedral, and others to Vienna for the royal stables. Among his other foreign works were the designs for the Sanctuary of Loyola in Spain, where Saint Ignatius of Loyola, the founder of the Jesuit Order, was born. This grandiose basilica was a major influence on the baroque architecture of the New World.

Fontana was an able artist and a good designer, but lacked the innovation that characterized early Baroque architects like Cortona and Borromini. In addition, he was more successful as an architect than as a writer. By order of Pope Innocent XI, he wrote a diffuse historical description of the Templum Vaticanum (1694), which included his project for completing St. Peter's. In this work, Fontana advised the demolition of that dense nest of medieval houses called La Spina which formed a sort of island from Ponte Sant'Angelo to the piazza of St. Peter's; the project was completed under Benito Mussolini, creating the Via della Conciliazione. Fontana made a calculation of the whole expense of St. Peter's from the beginning to 1694, which amounted to 46,800,052 crowns, without including models. He also published works on the Colosseum; the Aqueducts; the inundation of the Tiber, etc. Furthermore, twenty-seven manuscript volumes of his writings and sketches are preserved in the Royal Library at Windsor Castle.

Fontana was principe of the Accademia di San Luca in 1686 and 1692–1700. Fontana's studio was one of the most prolific in Europe; its designs for fountains, tombs, and altars were often imitated or reproduced abroad. Among Fontana's disciples, who spread his fame throughout Europe, were Giovanni Battista Vaccarini in Sicily, Filippo Juvarra in Italy and Spain, James Gibbs in England, Matthäus Daniel Pöppelmann in Germany, Johann Lucas von Hildebrandt and Fischer von Erlach in Austria, Nicodemus Tessin the Younger in Sweden, and Nicola Michetti in Italy and Russia. Other Fontana pupils include Giovan Battista Contini and Carlo Francesco Bizzaccheri.

== Works in Rome ==
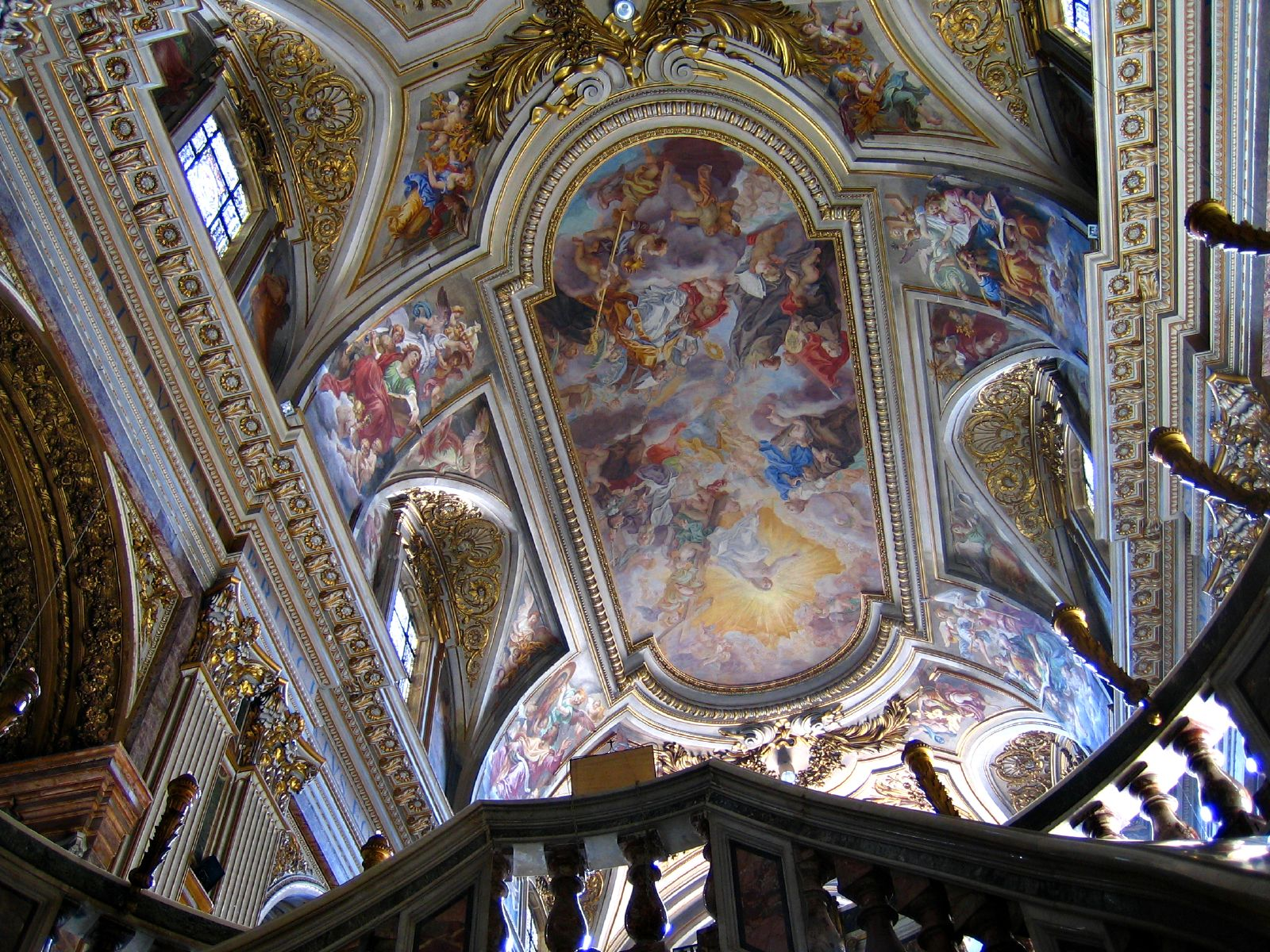
Santi Apostoli ceiling.

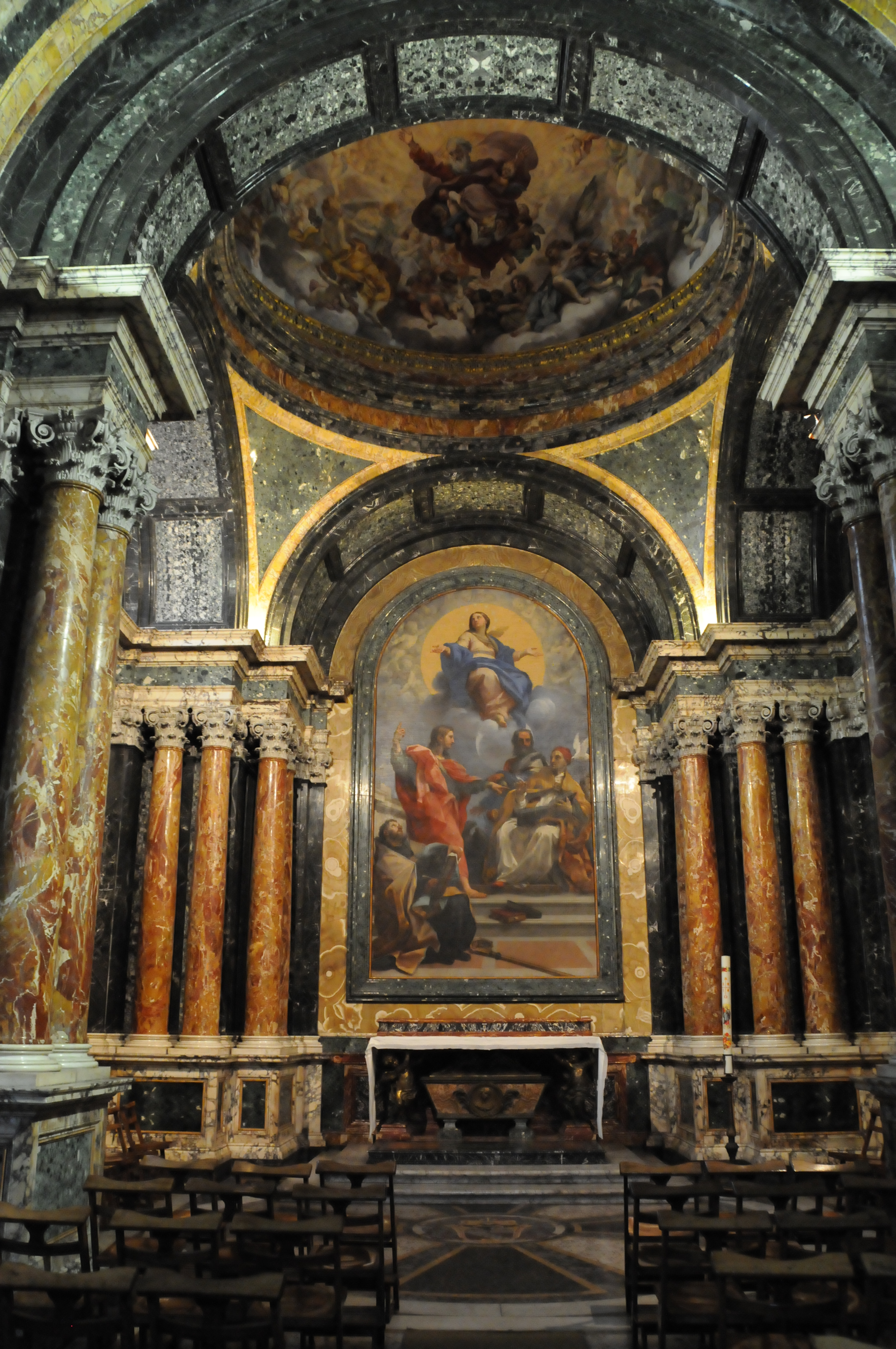
Cybo Chapel in Santa Maria del Popolo.

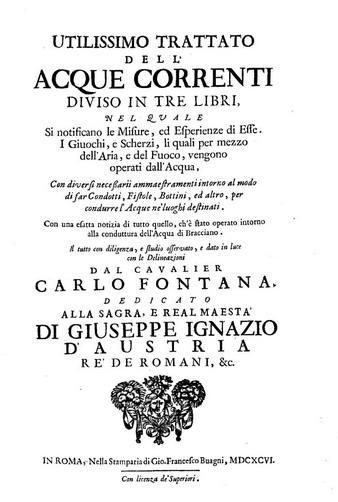
Utilissimo trattato dell'acque correnti (1696)

- Palazzo Giustiniani. Rebuilding and refurbishing, with Francesco Borromini and others
- Santa Maria in Traspontina. Main altar (1674)
- Palazzo Montecitorio (1694–97); the headquarters of the Chamber of Deputies of the Italian parliament since 1871.
- Façade of the church of San Marcello al Corso (1682–83). The slightly concave façade with the emphatic portico, the masterfully rhythmic use of Corinthian columns and pilasters, the subtle integration of upper and lower storeys and the independent counterpoint of friezes and cornices all exemplify Fontana's youthful manner, working in the organic Baroque that would be replaced by his later restrained academic Baroque. The conventional scrolls that ordinarily flank the upper central section are appropriately replaced with the martyr's palms.
- Church of Santa Maria dei Miracoli, in collaboration with Gian Lorenzo Bernini (1662–79).
- Church of San Biagio in Campitelli (1655).
- Basilica di San Clemente, 1713–19. Restorations.
- Interior of Basilica dei Santi Apostoli (1702–08).
- The fountain in the left of the Piazza San Pietro (1675).
- The fountain in front of Santa Maria in Trastevere, one of the oldest fountains of Rome, was restored by Fontana
- The Cybo Chapel in Santa Maria del Popolo (1682–87).
- Sistine Chapel in Santa Maria Maggiore (1671).
- Ginetti Chapel in Sant'Andrea della Valle (1671).
- Albani Chapel in San Sebastiano fuori le mura (1705).
- Biblioteca Casanatense at Santa Maria sopra Minerva (1708). Fontana's magnificent salone houses the library that was donated by Cardinal Casanate in 1698. The library was opened in 1725 .
- The great complex of San Michele a Ripa, with Mattia de' Rossi. The Chiesa Grande dates from 1706.
- Baptismal font, St. Peter's Basilica (1692–1698).
- The tombs of Popes Clement XI and Innocent XII.
- The tomb of Queen Christina of Sweden in St. Peter's Basilica (1702).
- Villa Cetinale in Tuscany.

== Bibliography ==
- This article incorporates text from the 1913 Catholic Encyclopedia article "Carlo Fontana" by Thomas H. Poole, a publication now in the public domain.
- Carlo, Fontana, Discorso... sopra il Monte Citatorio... (Rome 1694); facsimile (in Italian)
- Wittkower, Rudolf (1993). Pelican History of Art (ed.). Art and Architecture Italy, 1600–1750. 1980. Penguin Books Ltd. pp. 373–6.
