= Biagio Puccini =

Italian painter

Biagio Puccini (1673–1721) was an Italian painter, active in his native Rome, but also in Tuscany, Umbria and the Marche in a late Baroque style.

He was born in Rome. He trained with Antonio Gherardi, but was influenced by Giacinto Brandi, Giuseppe Ghezzi, and Carlo Maratta.
