= Via del Corso =

Thoroughfare in Rome, Italy

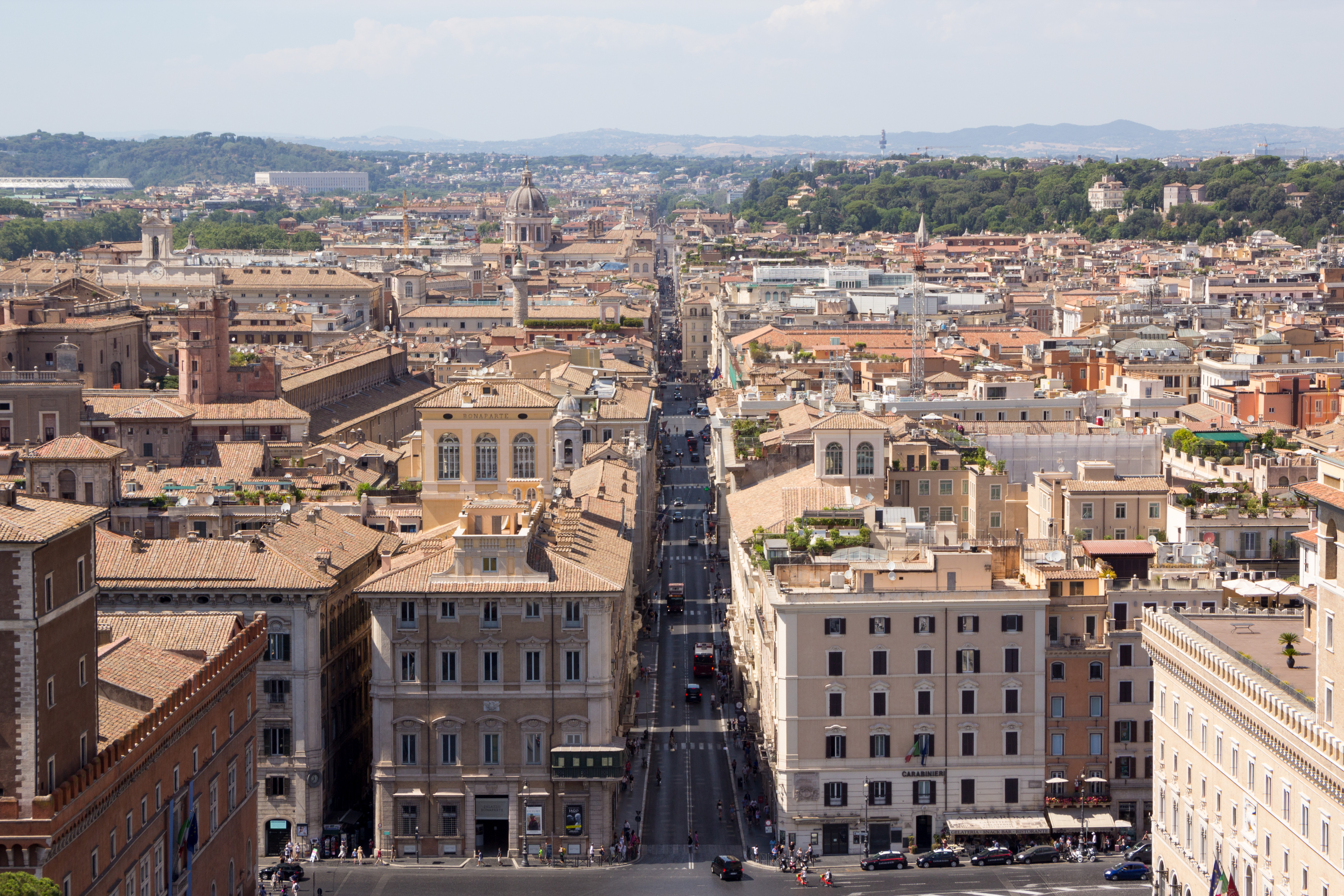
- Via del Corso seen from the Vittoriano (on the left Palazzo Bonaparte, where Maria Letizia Ramolino, Napoleon's mother, lived and died)
- Interactive map of Via del Corso
- Location: Rome, Italy
- Coordinates: 41°54′21.7″N 12°28′41.78″E

The Via del Corso is a main street in the historical centre of Rome. It is straight in an area otherwise characterized by narrow meandering alleys and small piazzas. Considered a wide street in ancient times, the Corso is approximately 10 metres wide, and it only has room for two lanes of traffic and two narrow sidewalks. The northern portion of the street is a pedestrian area. The length of the street is roughly 1.5 kilometres.

== Description ==
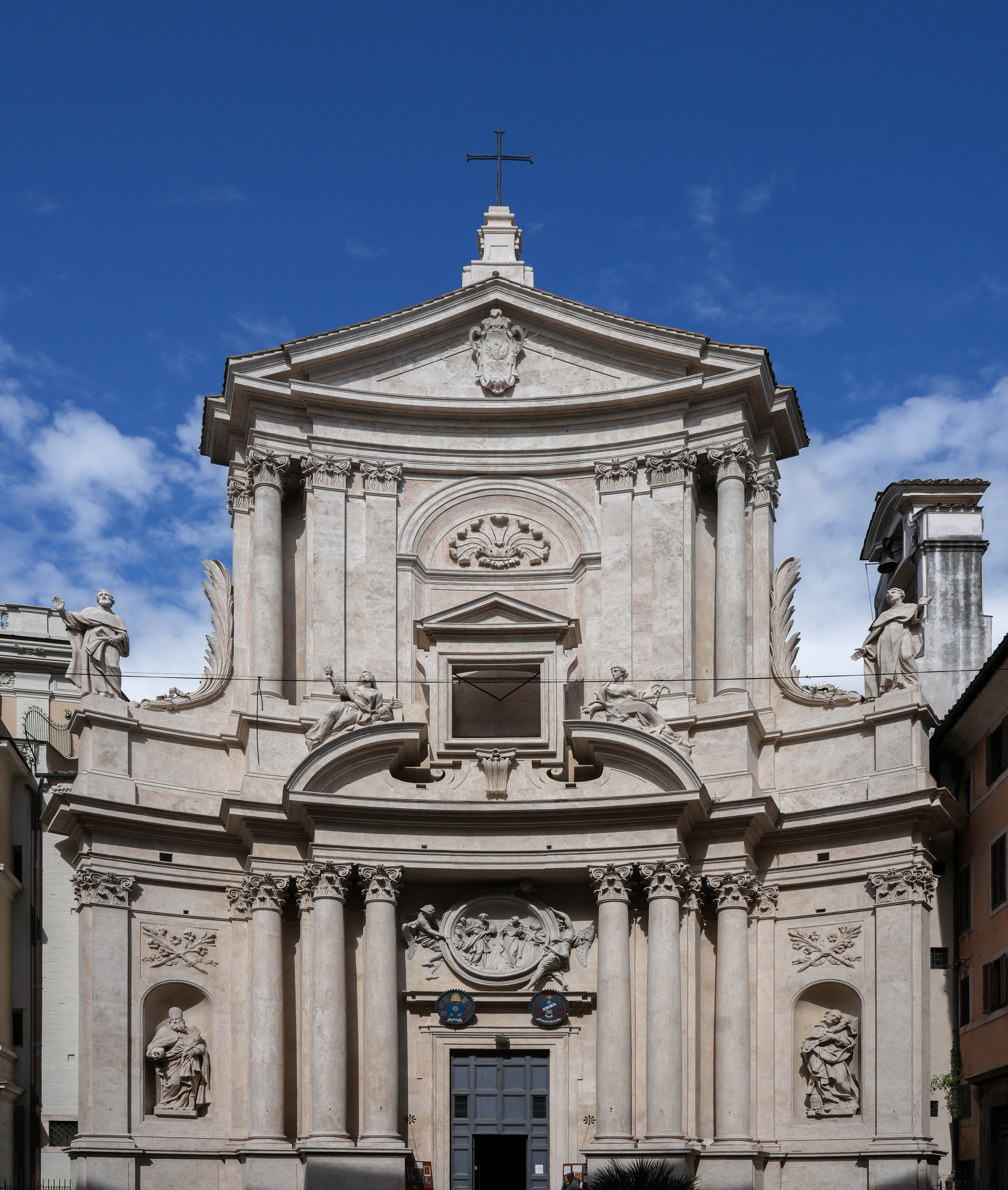
San Marcello al Corso

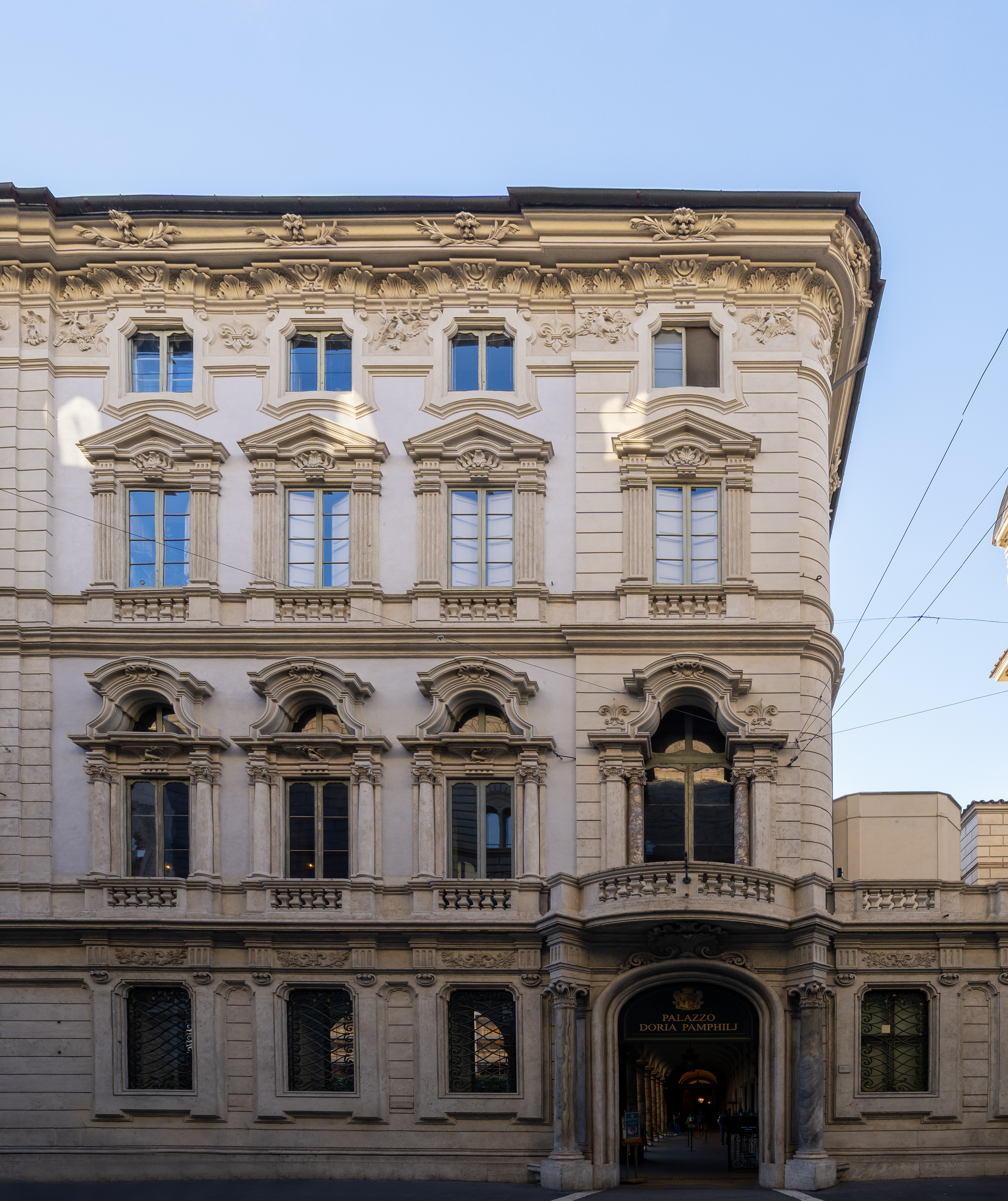
Galleria Doria Pamphilj art museum

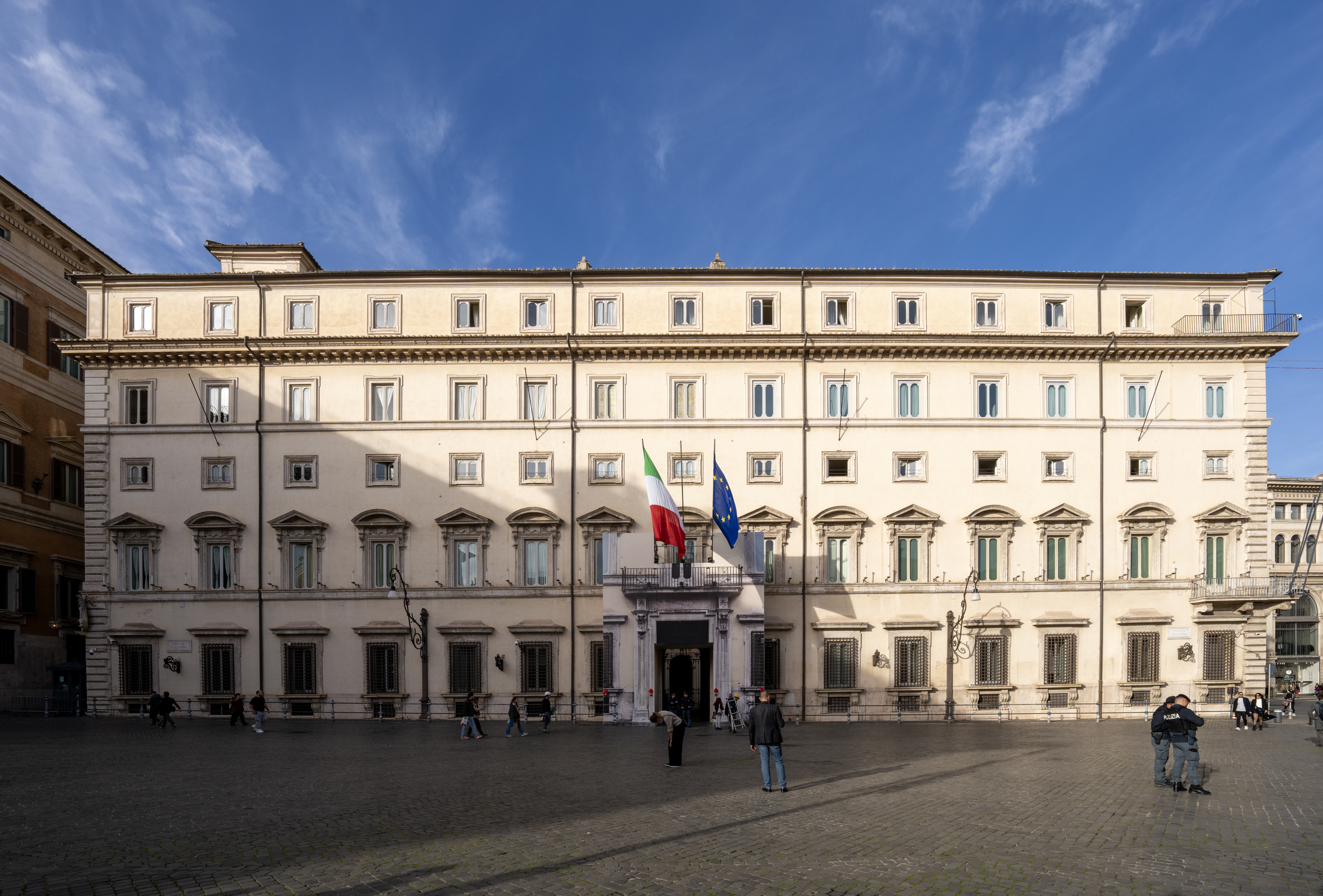
Chigi Palace seat of the Council of Ministers of the Government of Italy

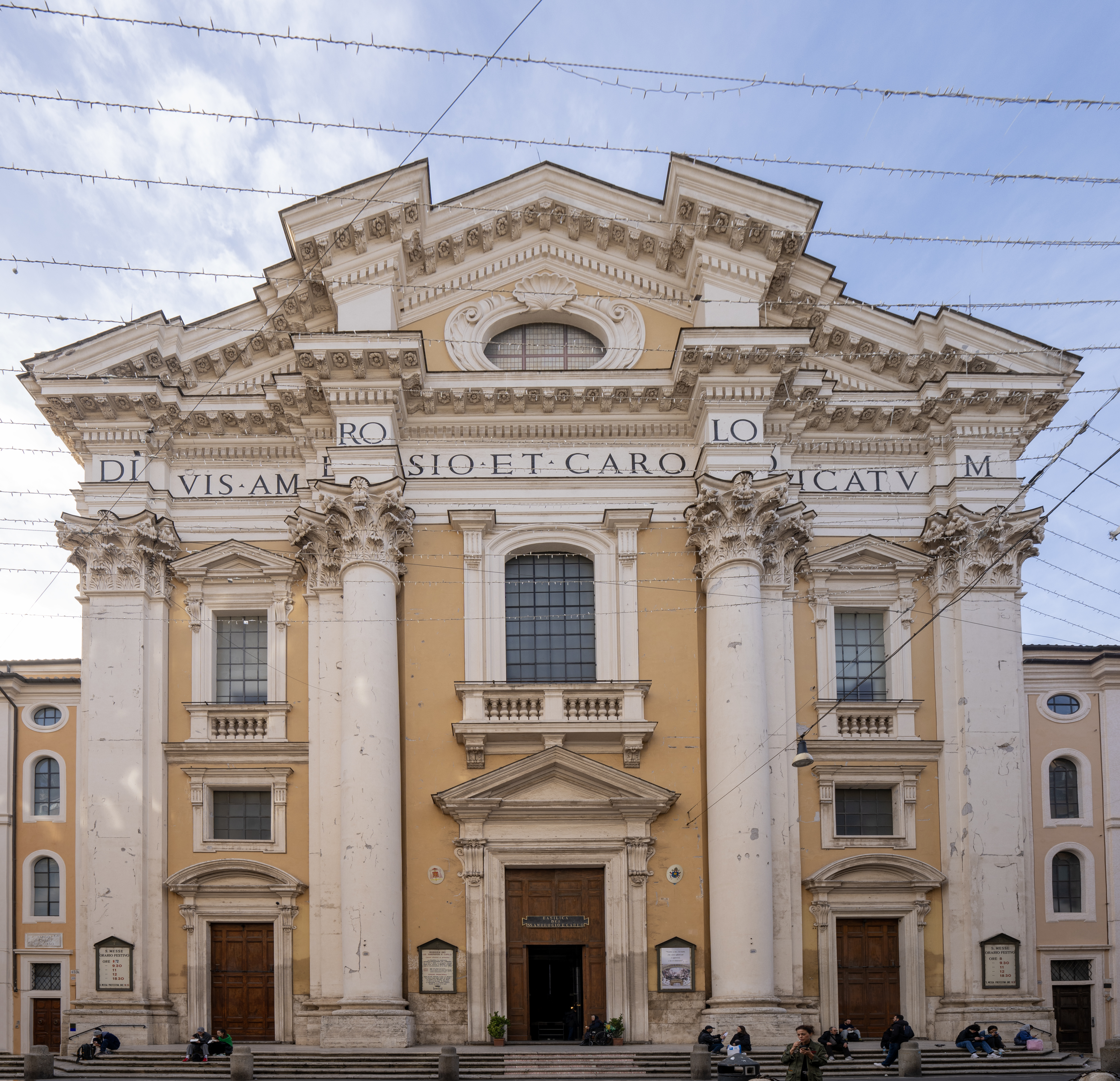
Sant'Ambrogio e Carlo al Corso

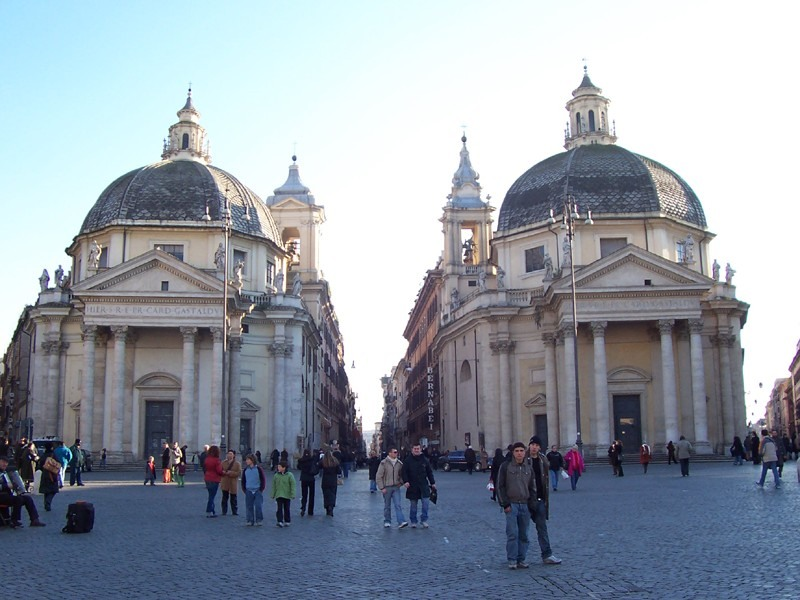
Via del Corso from Piazza del Popolo

The Corso runs in a generally north–south direction. To the north, it links the northern entrance gate to the city, the Porta del Popolo and its piazza, the Piazza del Popolo, to the heart of the city at the Piazza Venezia, at the base of the Capitoline Hill. At the Piazza del Popolo, Via del Corso is framed by two Baroque churches, Santa Maria dei Miracoli and Santa Maria in Montesanto. Along the street are:

- Casa di Goethe
- The church of San Carlo al Corso,
- The church of San Giacomo in Augusta,
- The church of Gesù e Maria,
- The Piazza Colonna with the ancient column of Marcus Aurelius,
- The Galleria Alberto Sordi,
- The church of Santa Maria in Via Lata,
- The Oratory of Santissimo Crocifisso,
- The church of San Marcello al Corso and
- The Palazzo Doria Pamphili.

From the fifteenth century, the road served as the racetrack during the Roman Carnival for an annual running of riderless horses called the "corsa dei barberi", which is the source for the name Via del Corso. Following the assassination of King Umberto I in 1900, the road was renamed Corso Umberto I. In 1944, it became Corso del Popolo and two years later reverted to Corso.

Today, the Corso is a popular place for the passeggiata, the evening stroll for the populace to be seen and to see others. It is also an important shopping street for tourists and locals alike.

== History ==
The history of Via del Corso began in 220 BC when Gaius Flaminius censor built a new road to link Rome with the Adriatic Sea in the north. The starting point of the road was Porta Fontinalis, a gate in the Servian city walls near present-day Piazza Venezia. In its first miles Via Flaminia cut through the plain between the Tiber and the eastern hills in a straight line. The Field of Mars, as it was called, was at the time used as a training ground and pasture. Numerous tombs must have lined the road similarly to the Appian Way.

The open area outside the city walls went through a process of urbanization during the late Republican and early imperial age. The city gradually spread towards north and monumental public buildings were built along the road. A set of dynastic monuments around the Mausoleum of Augustus was the most important development in the formerly unpopulated northern section of the district.

The ancient name of Via Lata (which means Broad Way) denotes that the street was considered wide, especially in comparison to neighbouring lanes but at three places along its length, it became narrower due to triumphal arches. The first was the Arcus Novus erected by Diocletian in 303–304, then the Arch of Claudius (AD 51–52) stood further ahead (the Aqua Virgo aqueduct crossed the road on top of it) and the third was later known as the Arco di Portogallo.

The most important ancient monuments along Via Lata were Aurelian's Temple of the Sun, the Ara Pacis, the Ustrinum Domus Augustae, the Ara Providentiae and the Column of Marcus Aurelius. A densely populated residential quarter from the Hadrianic era was discovered on the right side of the road between Via delle Muratte and Via delle Convertite. With the building of the Aurelian Walls (AD 271–75) the whole area was incorporated into the city of Rome, and a new city gate (Porta Flaminia) was erected at present-day Piazza del Popolo where the road left the urban territory.

From around the year 600 AD, the Corso accommodated a welfare centre linked to feeding the populace at Santa Maria in Via Lata and granaries at its southern end. During the Middle Ages the Via Lata, the present day Corso, effectively denoted a boundary, to the city which mainly developed to the south and east of it. Also for this reason here was built in 1339 the hospital San Giacomo degli Incurabili, later rebuilt in the today form.

From the fifteenth century, the Via del Corso became a fashionable street for new or renovated churches and new palaces for the nobility. However, by the mid seventeenth century, the street remained a mixture of different scales and architectural styles, some unfashionable, a number of churches lacked facades and some buildings were a combination of structures from different periods or were simply incomplete.

The lack of regularity and decorum of this principal street of the city meant that it became a main urban priority of Pope Alexander VII. In pursuing the nobility to complete their properties, he met with limited success; some just did not have the funds, some were content to avoid the issue by continuing to reside on their country estates In the case of unfinished churches, he encouraged ecclesiastical colleagues to act as sponsors. Where he met with greater success was over imposing order on the street by empowering the maestri di strade, the municipal body in charge of streets, to clear, align and regularize the street . This meant the properties could be acquired and demolished if necessary, projections from buildings could be removed and others added to so as to maintain a consistent line of street frontage. He even had the ancient triumphal arch, the Arco di Portogallo, demolished because the central gateway of this arch effectively reduced the street width to almost half.

Alexander took a particular interest in regularizing the Piazza Colonna, about halfway along the Corso. In 1659, his family, the Chigi, bought the incomplete Palazzo Aldobrandini, bordering the piazza and the Corso, and rebuilt as Palazzo Chigi. Around the same time, the leading painter of the time, Pietro da Cortona, developed a design for a ‘fountain palace’ in the piazza, a palace with a large fountain at the base of the façade, but this precursor of the Trevi Fountain was not built.

The Corso was also tied to Alexander's intentions to impress significant dignitaries paying official visits to the city. The Porta del Popolo was reworked and the Piazza del Popolo cleared. The two Baroque churches facing onto the Piazza marked perpectivised vistas along the Via del Babuino to the left, the Via di Ripetta to the right and at the centre, the straightened and regularized Via del Corso leading to the Piazza Venezia. This complex of three streets is known as Tridente.

== See also ==
- The Corso, Manly

Preceded by Via dei Coronari	Landmarks of Rome; Via del Corso	Succeeded by Via della Conciliazione
