= Via del Babuino =

Coordinates: 41°54′29″N 12°28′46″E

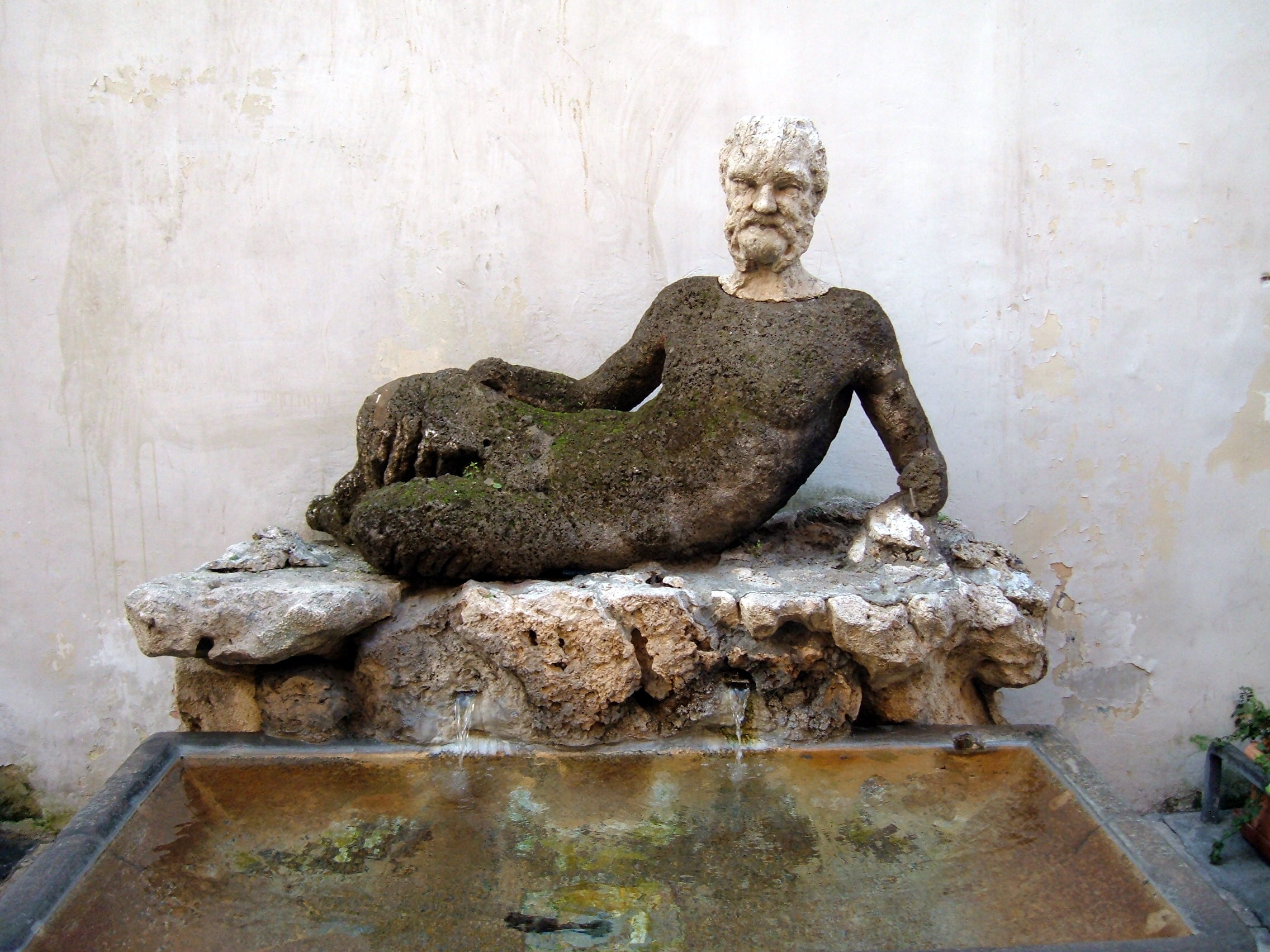
The fountain of the "babuino", giving its name to the street

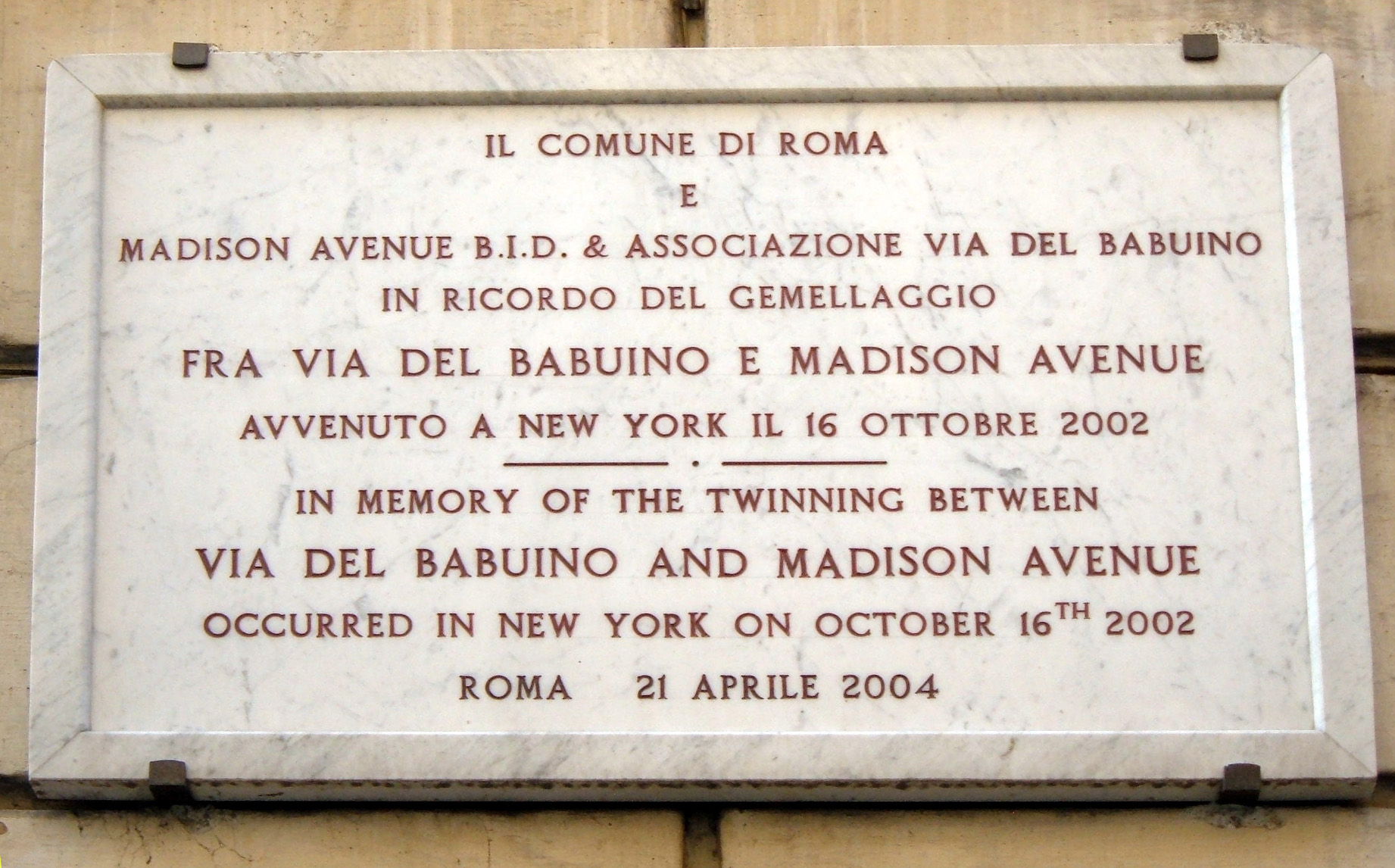
The plate remembering the twinning between Via del Babuino and Madison Avenue in New York

Via del Babuino is a street in the historic centre of Rome (Italy), located in the rione Campo Marzio. It connects Piazza del Popolo to Piazza di Spagna and is part of the complex of streets known as Tridente.

== History ==
The origins of Via del Babuino dates back to 13th century. The first two names of the street were Via dell’Orto di Napoli and Via del Cavalletto. In 1525, works commissioned by Pope Clement VII gave the street a new aspect and a new name: Via Clementina, in honor of its creator. It later became Via Paolina, because of the works carried out under Pope Paul III in 1540. In 1571, on the initiative of Pope Pius V, a new fountain for public use was installed along the street. In this occasion a statue of Silenus, an ancient classical deity related to springs and fountains, was also placed on the street. The statue quickly became infamous among the inhabitants of the rione because of its ugliness. The statues was compared to a monkey, and was thus nicknamed Babuino (Romanesco for "Baboon"); this name soon came to indicate the whole street.

A plate remembers the twinning ratified on October 16, 2002 between Via del Babuino and Madison Avenue in New York City.

== Famous residents ==
- Salvator Rosa and Nicolas Poussin, about 1639;
- Franz Liszt, at the street number 89, and Madame Récamier at 65, where Salvator Rosa had formerly lived;
- Italian baritone Antonio Cotogni at 65
- Near the construction sites of Piazza del Popolo and Pincian Hill, where he worked, Giuseppe Valadier built his own house, in which he died;
- more recently, Leonida Rèpaci, Elsa Morante, Maria Luisa Spaziani and Elémire Zolla, among others, have chosen to live here.

== Monuments ==
On Via del Babuino, from Piazza del Popolo to Piazza di Spagna, are the following historical monuments:

- Palazzo Nainer (19th century)
- Hotel de Russie (19th century)
- Palazzo Emiliani (1879)
- Palazzo Boncompagni Sterbini (18th century)
- All Saints Church, the Anglican church of Rome
- Palazzo Boncompagni Cerasi (17th century)
- Church of Sant'Atanasio, Catholic church of Greek Rite
- Fountain of the Babuino
- Pontificio Collegio Greco (18th century)
- Palazzo Valadier (18th century)
- Palazzetto Raffaelli (18th century)
- Palazzo Saulini (18th century)
- Palazzo Righetti (19th century)
- Museo Atelier Canova-Tadolini.
