= Paolo Maria Martinez =

Spanish-Italian nobleman

- Born: 1771; Rome, Italy
- Died: 13 November 1833 (aged 61–62); Rome
- Other name: Paolo M. Martinez
- Occupation: philanthropist
- Known for: Bequest to San Giacomo degli Incurabili

Paolo Maria Martinez (1771 – 13 November 1833) was a Spanish–Italian military and patron.

He was appointed Noble Guard by Pius VII in 1801. He became a Priore dei Caporioni in 1819 and Conservatore of Rome in 1829. He was remembered for the bequest of 12,000 scudi made in favor of the San Giacomo degli Incurabili in 1833 by a plaque in the hospital and a monument in Santa Maria del Popolo.

== Bibliography ==
- Amayden, Theodoro (1967). La storia delle famiglie romane (in Italian). Rome: Forni. p. 97.
