= Santa Maria Portae Paradisi =

Church building in Rome, Italy

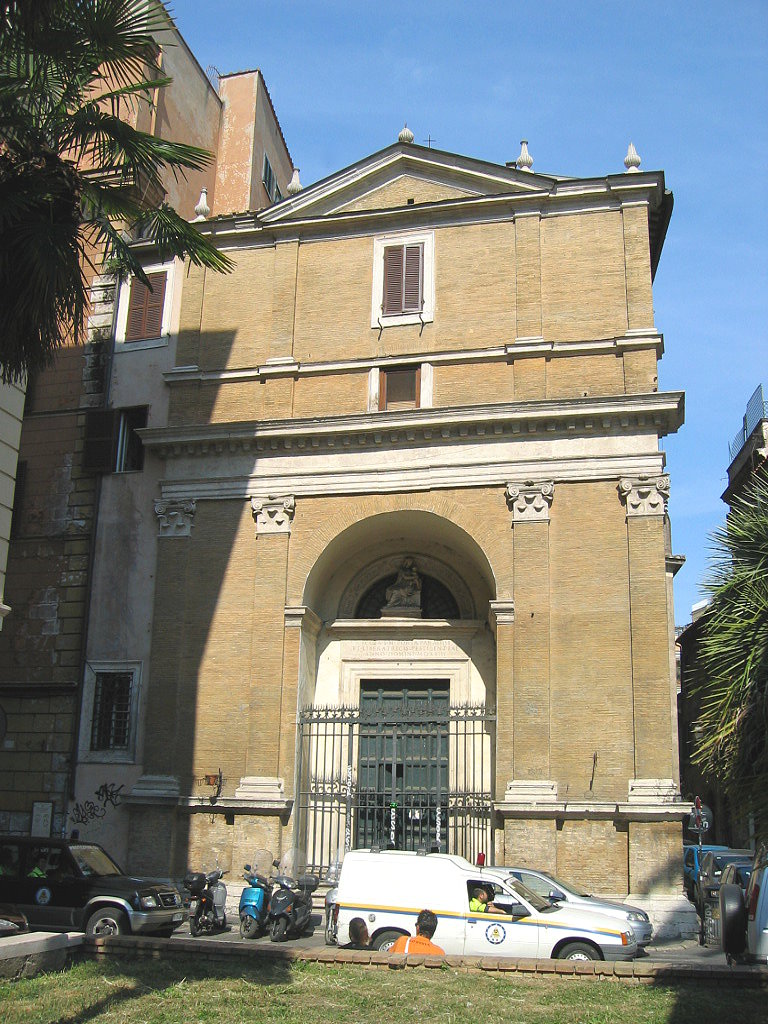

Religion
- Affiliation: Christian Catholic
- District: Campo Marzio
- Province: Diocese of Rome
- Rite: Roman Rite
- Status: Active

Location
- Location: Rome, Italy
- Interactive map of Santa Maria Portae Paradisi

Architecture
- Architect: Antonio da Sangallo the Younger
- Style: Renaissance
- Groundbreaking: 16th century

Santa Maria Portae Paradisi is a Catholic church in Rome, in the Rione Campo Marzio, along via di Ripetta.

== History ==
The church, already known in the 9th century with the name Santa Maria in Augusta, received the title in Porta Paradisi, or simply Portae Paradisi (Latin: "of the Gates of Heaven"), because it stood near one of the doors of the walls that surrounded the nearby Mausoleum of Augustus, also called paradiseiois. Another explanation is that nearby there was the cemetery (closed in 1836 for health reasons, due to a cholera outbreak) of the Hospital of San Giacomo in Augusta, also called degli Incurabili (Italian: of the incurable). The church was used for funeral ceremonies as it was close to the ancient hospital cemetery.

In the 16th century the church was rebuilt by Antonio da Sangallo the Younger and on that occasion took the current name. Its facade, giving on via di Ripetta, is preceded by a little porch and incorporates a marble relief depicting a Madonna and Child, attributed to Andrea Sansovino. The interior has an octagonal plan and preserves works of art of the 17th century by Pietro Paolo Ubaldini, Cosimo Fancelli, Paolo Naldini. The pipe organ opus 447 , made in 1962 by organ builder Tamburini, with 18 registers on two manuals and pedal, is located above the counter-façade.

== Bibliography ==
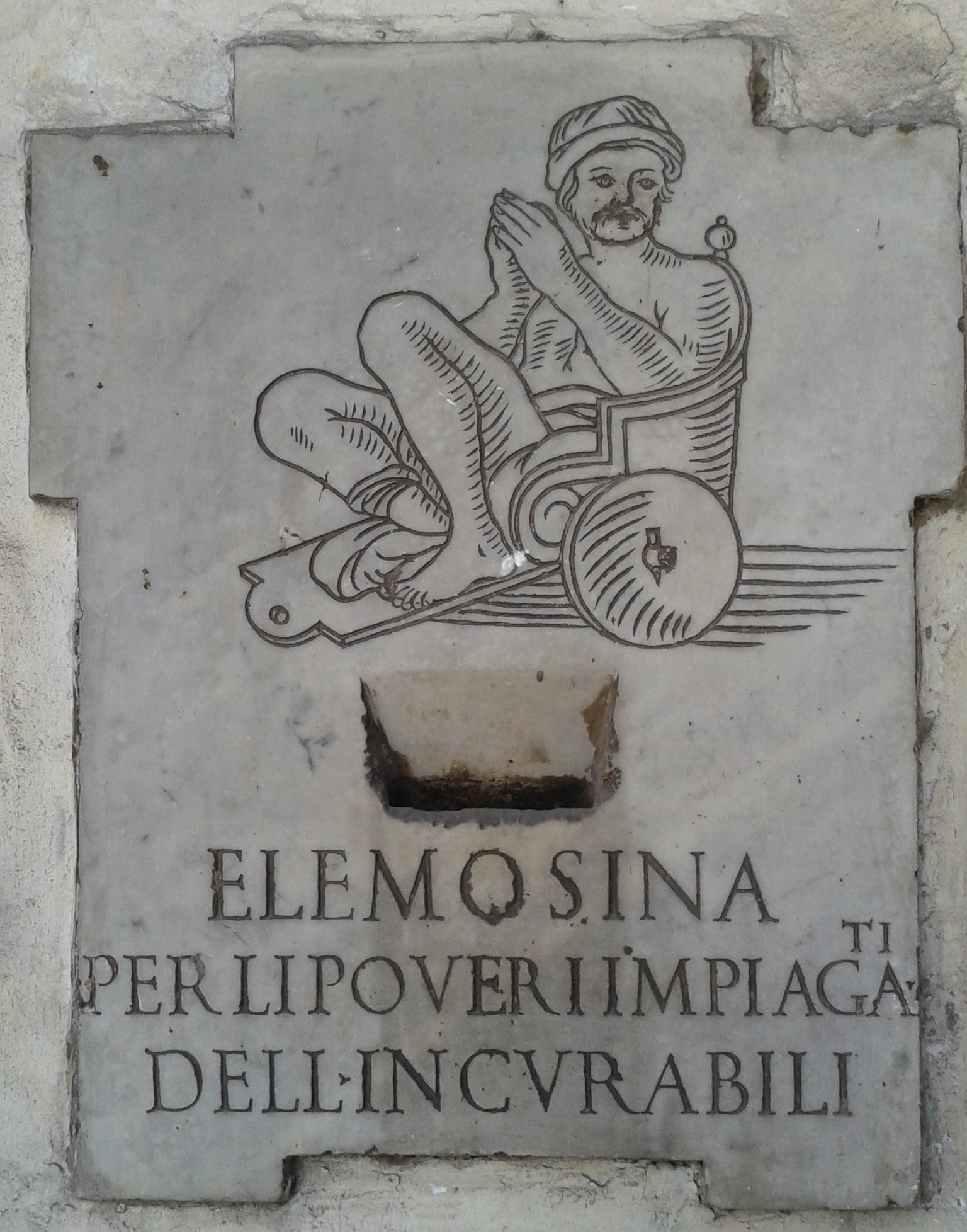
Plaque at the entrance of the church (the inscription reads: "Alms for the poor wounded of the incurable")

- Mariano Armellini, Le chiese di Roma dal secolo IV al XIX, Rome 1891, p. 326
- F. Titi, Descrizione delle Pitture, Sculture e Architetture esposte in Roma, Rome 1763, p. 394
- Paola Raffaella David, Interventi di conservazione nella chiesa di Santa Maria in Porta Paradisi a Roma, in Bollettino d'Arte, 112 (2000), pp. 101–115
- Claudio Rendina (2000). Le Chiese di Roma. Rome: Newton & Compton Editori. p. 256. ISBN 978-88-541-1833-1.
- M.Quercioli (2000). Rione IV. Campo Marzio. I rioni e i quartieri di Roma. Vol. 1. Rome: Newton & Compton Editori. pp. 264–334.
- Anna Lio (2000). L'ospedale di San Giacomo e la chiesa di Santa Maria Porta Paradisi. Rome: Palombi.

== Related pages ==
- San Giacomo degli Incurabili
