= Sala Lancisiana of Saint James in Augusta =

Renaissance building in Rome, Italy

Sala Lancisiana
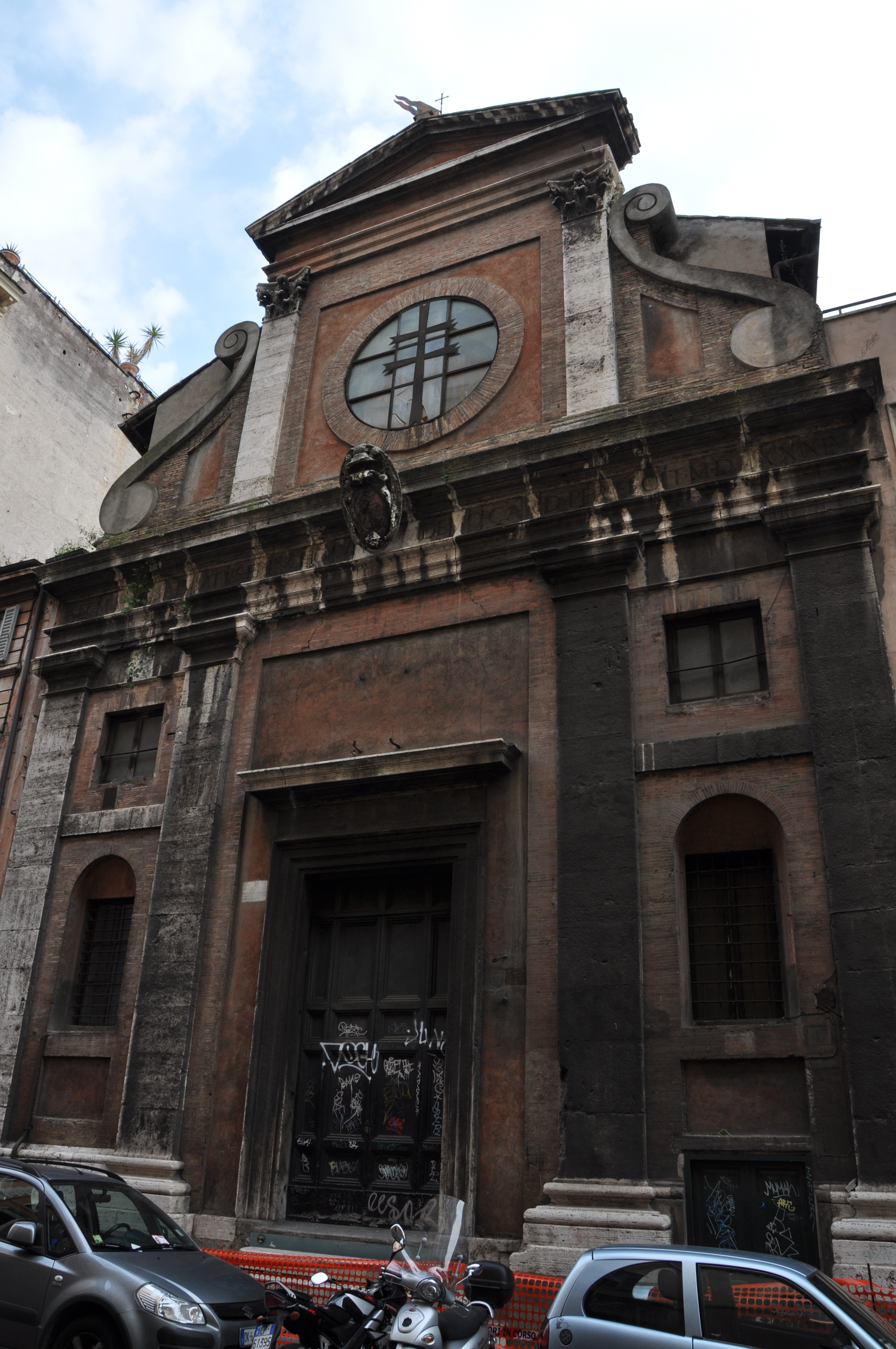

- Location in Rome Location in Italy

General information
- Architectural style: Renaissance
- Location: Rome, Italy
- Coordinates: 41.90795°N 12.47612°E
- Completed: 1593
- Owner: Public authority (Regione Lazio from 2008)

Design and construction
- Architect: Francesco Capriani

The Sala Lancisiana is a renaissance building located in Rome, part of the hospital of San Giacomo degli Incurabili, and site of an anatomical theatre. It was built at the end of the 16th century by the architect Francesco Capriani at the behest of Cardinal Anton Maria Salviati, and named after the physician Giovanni Maria Lancisi.

== Description ==
The entrance looks out onto Via di Ripetta and is characterised by a two-tiered symmetrical façade in renaissance style, bearing a Latin inscription commemorating its construction in 1593:

Ant. M. Salviatus Ep. incohavit idemq. Card. perfecit MDLXXXIV.

The interior has a circular plan with concentric wooden seats, the ogival ceiling is decorated with frescoes.

== History ==
It was built at the behest of Cardinal Anton Maria Salviati in 1593 as part of the reconstruction of the Ospedale di San Giacomo degli Incurabili by the architect Francesco Capriani.

The building was used as an anatomical theatre in 1780 by the decree of Pope Pius VI. It was named after the physician Giovanni Maria Lancisi, founder of the Lancisian Academy. It was the seat of surgical teaching in 1780, and seat of the chair of surgery established by Pius VII in 1815.

Later it hosted conferences on medical and science topics. It was eventually used as morgue. In modern times it has also been called Aula di Malta.

== Gallery ==
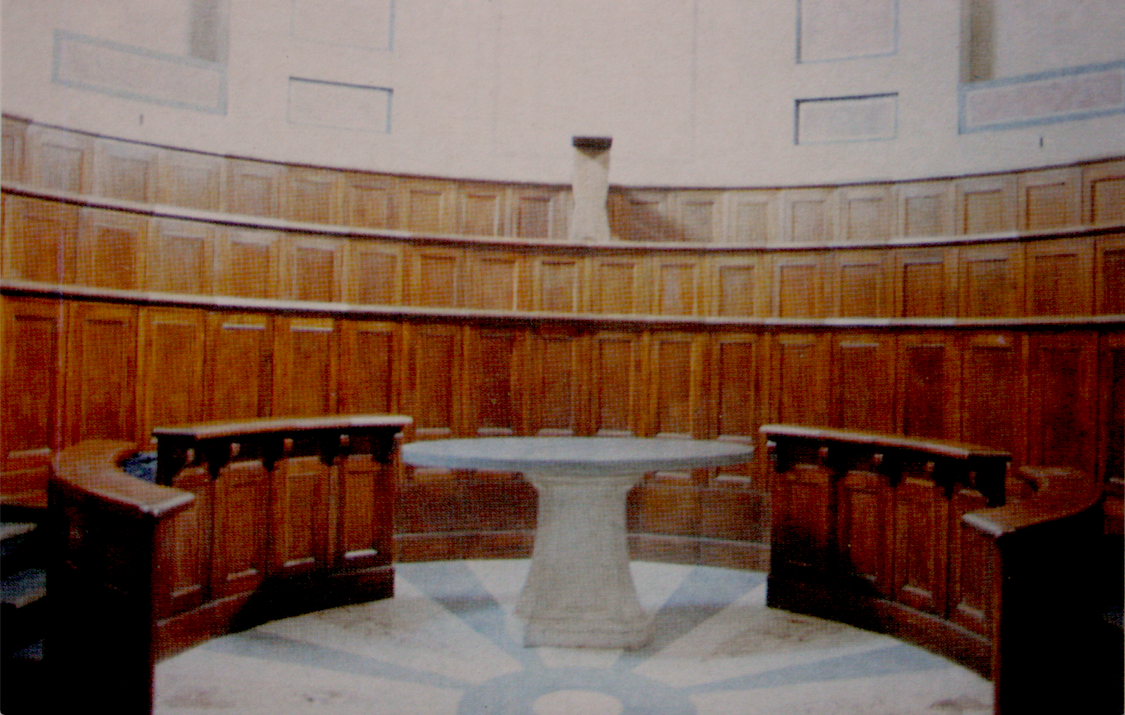
Anatomical theatre

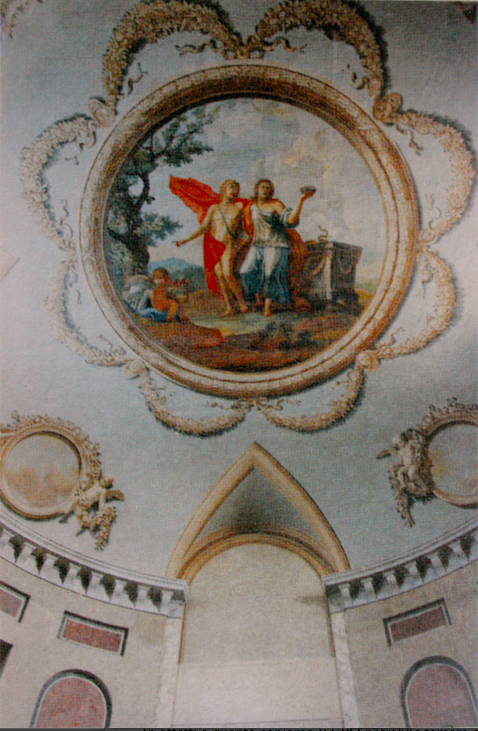
Anatomical theatre: frescos

== Bibliography ==
- Francesca Romana Stabile (2018). "L'ospedale di S. Giacomo in Augusta, dall'assistenza alla cura". Ricerche di Storia dell'arte (in Italian). 41 (3). Carocci: 5–17. doi:10.7374/92086. ISSN 0392-7202.
- Enrico Fedele, L'Ospedale San Giacomo in Augusta tra storia, assistenza e cultura (PDF), in Annali Italiani di Chirurgia, vol. 74, n. 2, 2003. Retrieved 14 September 2020.
- Carlo Luigi Morichini (1842). Degl'istituti di pubblica carità ed istruzione primaria e delle prigioni in Roma (in Italian). Vol. 1. Roma: Marini.

== See also ==
- Ospedale di San Giacomo degli Incurabili
- Teatro anatomico
