= Roberto Rasinelli =

Italian painter (c. 1840–1910)

- Born: 1840; Rome
- Died: 1910 (aged 69–70); Rome

Roberto Rasinelli (c. 1840 – c. 1910) was an Italian painter, mainly painting landscapes and genre scenes, in oil and watercolor. He often painted his landscapes on site, outdoors.

== Biography ==
He was born in Rome and was for many years a resident of Bologna. He completed his studies in Rome at the Academy of Fine Arts of St Luke. He displayed in 1877 at the National Exhibition: Buon consiglio and L'età delle rose. In 1880 at Turin, he displayed: La conca del pranzo; and in 1883 at Rome and 1884 at Turin: Lo Stabilimento dei bagni a Ripetta (I Bagni nel Tevere). He painted rural scenes from the Lazio region. He painted Aqueduct of Claudius, exhibited in 1886 at Florence. Moving to Bologna, he painted the Bolognese countryside: Giornata d' inverno. Other paintings of this artist are: L' ora del pasto; Ruderi; Lungo il Tevere; Giovinezza; Ora triste. In later years, he lost his sight, and after he died, he bequeathed his studio and home on Via Margutta 51 in Rome to the Istituto dei ciechi di Sant’Alessio.
