= San Giacomo in Augusta =

- St. James in Augusta (in English); Sancti Iacobi in Augusta (in Latin)
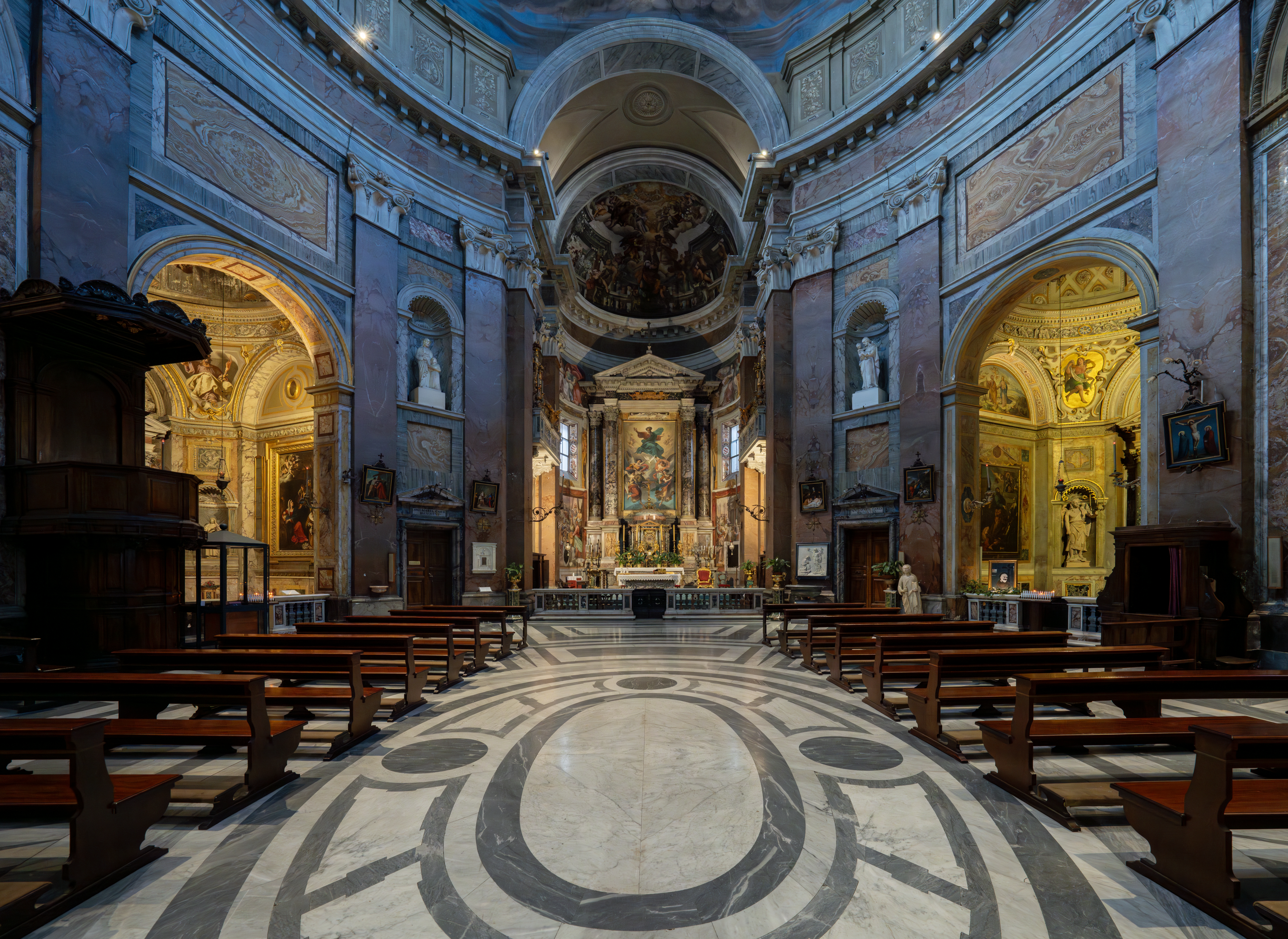
- Interior
- Click on the map for a fullscreen view
- 41°54′28″N 12°28′38″E
- Location: Via del Corso 499, Rome
- Country: Italy
- Denomination: Roman Catholic
- Tradition: Roman Rite

History
- Status: Titular church
- Dedication: James the Great

Architecture
- Architect(s): Francesco Capriani and Carlo Maderno
- Architectural type: Church
- Style: Baroque
- Groundbreaking: 14th century
- Completed: 1600

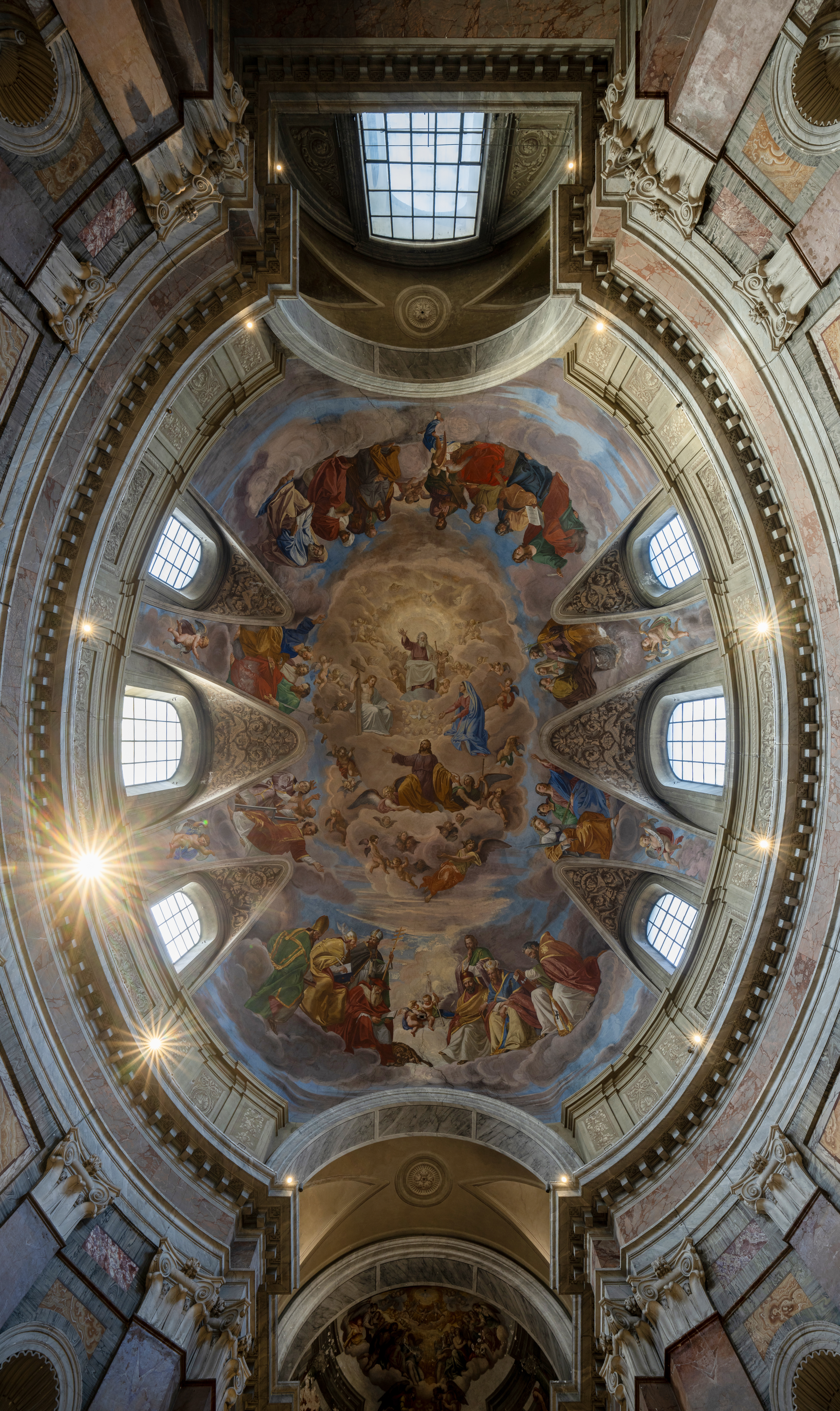
Oval ceiling

San Giacomo in Augusta (also known as San Giacomo degli Incurabili) is a Baroque church in Rome, Italy. It was the church of the Hospital of San Giacomo degli Incurabili.

== Location and name ==
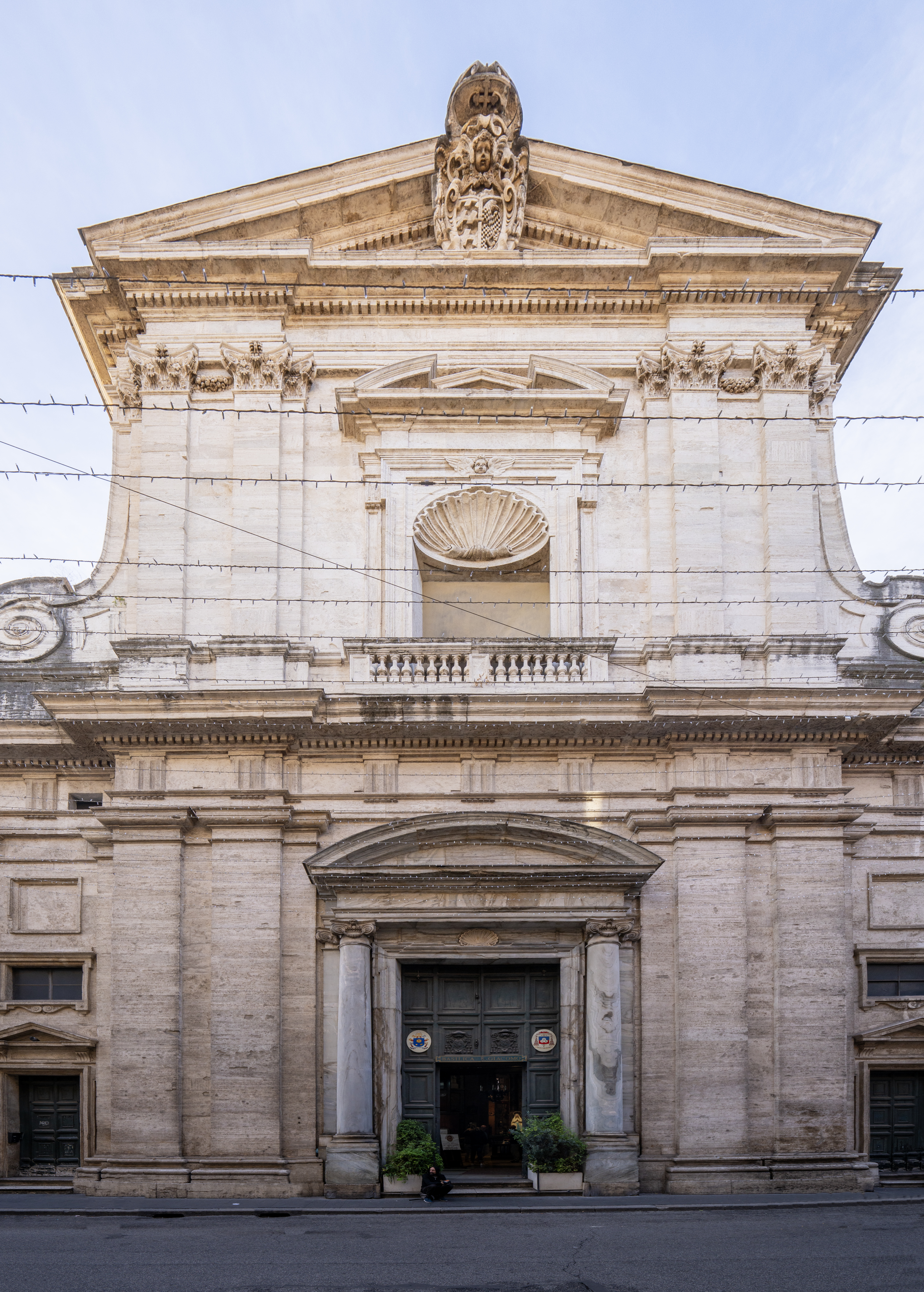
Facade

Located on Via del Corso, roughly three blocks south of the Piazza del Popolo in the rione Campo Marzio, nearly opposite to the church of Gesù e Maria. A Church at this site was originally built in the 14th century adjacent to the hospital for the incurables (Incurabili), and thus is also known as San Giacomo degli Incurabili. The suffix "in Augusta" refers to the neighboring Mausoleum of Augustus.

== History ==
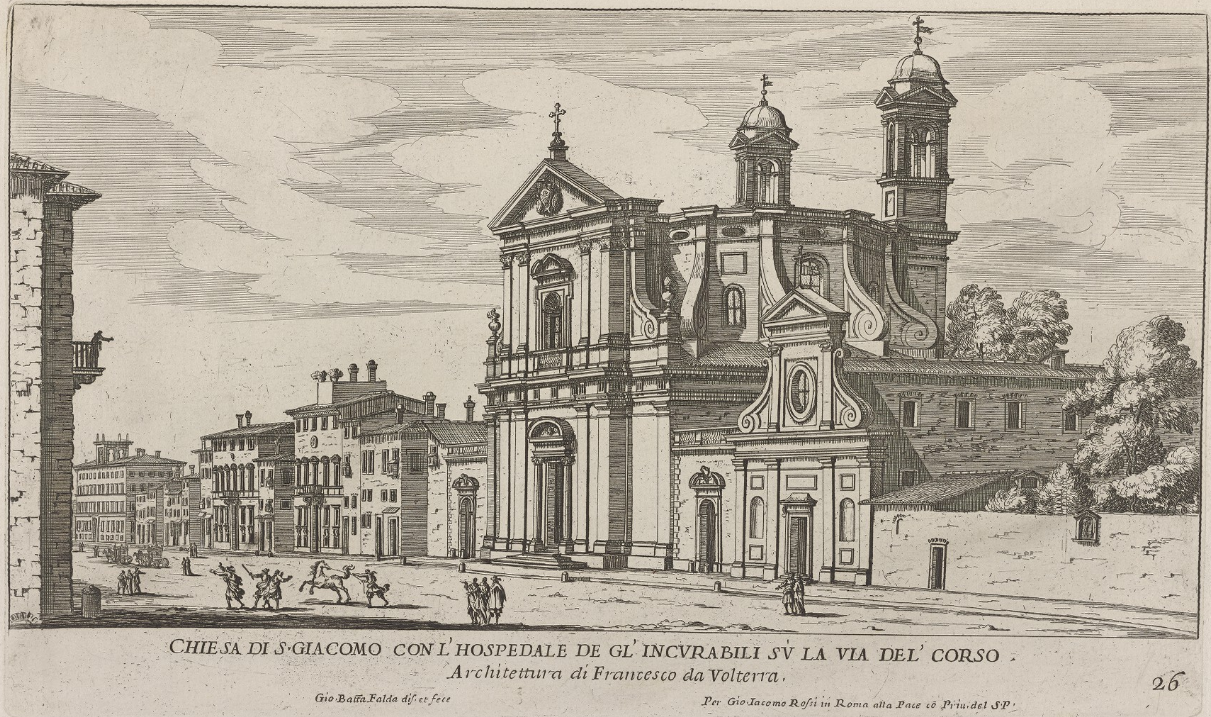
Engraving of San Giacomo in Augusta, c. 1667–69

A church at the location was founded along with a hospital by Cardinal Giovanni Colonna in 1339. By 1515, the hospital was in a state of abandon but within a few decades reopened under the supervision of two religious orders with the aim of curing those affected by syphilis. Pope Nicholas V placed it under the control of the Company of Santa Maria del Popolo. This order was under the patronage of the Florentine Cardinal Antonio Maria Salviati who commissioned the reconstruction of the church. The church was built from 1592 by Francesco Capriani and completed after his death by Carlo Maderno in 1604–1609.

== Interior ==
Within the oval shape of the interior a cross shape of two axes from entrance to main altar and the central chapels of the sides establishes a dominance of the second chapel of each side with respect to the two other subordinate ones.

For the central second chapel on the right, the sculptor Pierre Le Gros the Younger is also documented as the architect - which basically means he was in charge of all its decoration from 1711–14. The chapel was originally dedicated to the Virgin Mary but received a second dedication to St. Francis of Paola when it was transformed into the funeral chapel of a former governor of the church, Antonio de Filippi. The centre piece is a large marble relief by Le Gros showing the saint in adoration of an old venerated image of the Madonna and child, intervening to cure the sick. On the side walls are large paintings by Giuseppe Passeri also showing episodes of the life of Francis of Paola.

On the altar in the first chapel on the right is a Resurrection by the mannerist painter Cristoforo Roncalli. In the third chapel is a Baptism of Christ by Domenico Passignano, the Last Supper by Giovanni Battista Ricci and also the History of Melchisedec and the Story of Manna in the Desert by Vespasiano Strada.

The central chapel on the left features the statue of San Giacomo by Ippolito Buzzi, the first chapel on the left a Nativity painted by Antiveduto Grammatica and the third a number of paintings by Francesco Zucchi.

== Cardinal titular church ==
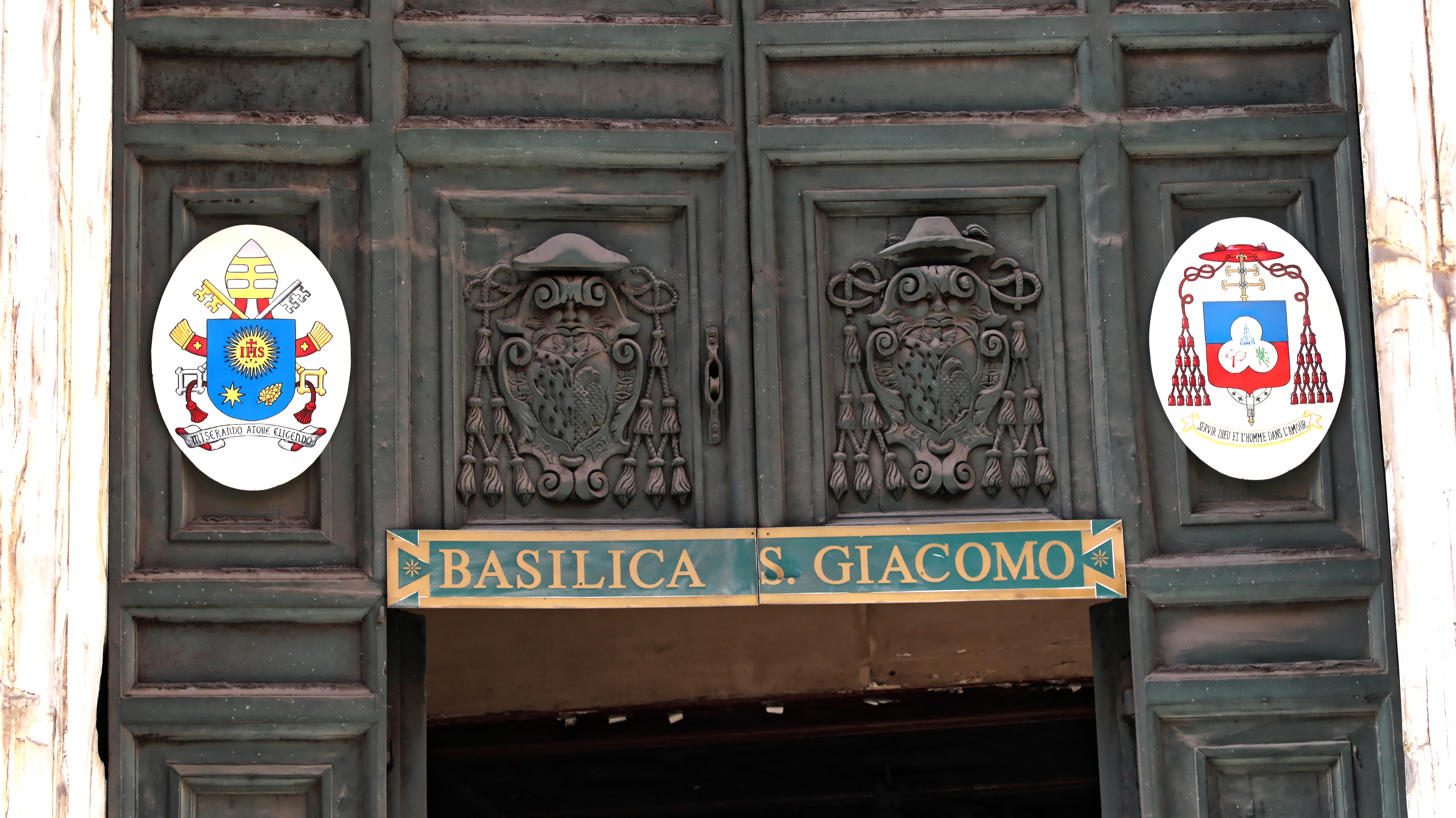
Door of San Giacomo, with plaques displaying the arms of Pope Francis (left) and those of Cardinal Langlois (right). Despite the sign, San Giacomo is not actually a basilica.

On 22 February 2014 Pope Francis established San Giacomo in Augusta as a new titular church. He appointed as its first Cardinal Priest the Haitian Cardinal Chibly Langlois.

- Chibly Langlois 22 February 2014 – present

== Sources ==
- Rome: A tour of many days : in three volumes, Volume 1. By George Head, p 106. London 1849.
- Titi, Filippo (1763). Descrizione delle Pitture, Sculture e Architetture esposte in Roma. Marco Pagliarini, Rome. pp. 384–385.

== Related pages ==
- San Giacomo degli Incurabili
- Anton Maria Salviati

== See also ==
- 16th-century Western domes
