= Via di Ripetta =

Historic street in Rome, Italy

Coordinates: 41°54′26.02″N 12°28′33.00″E

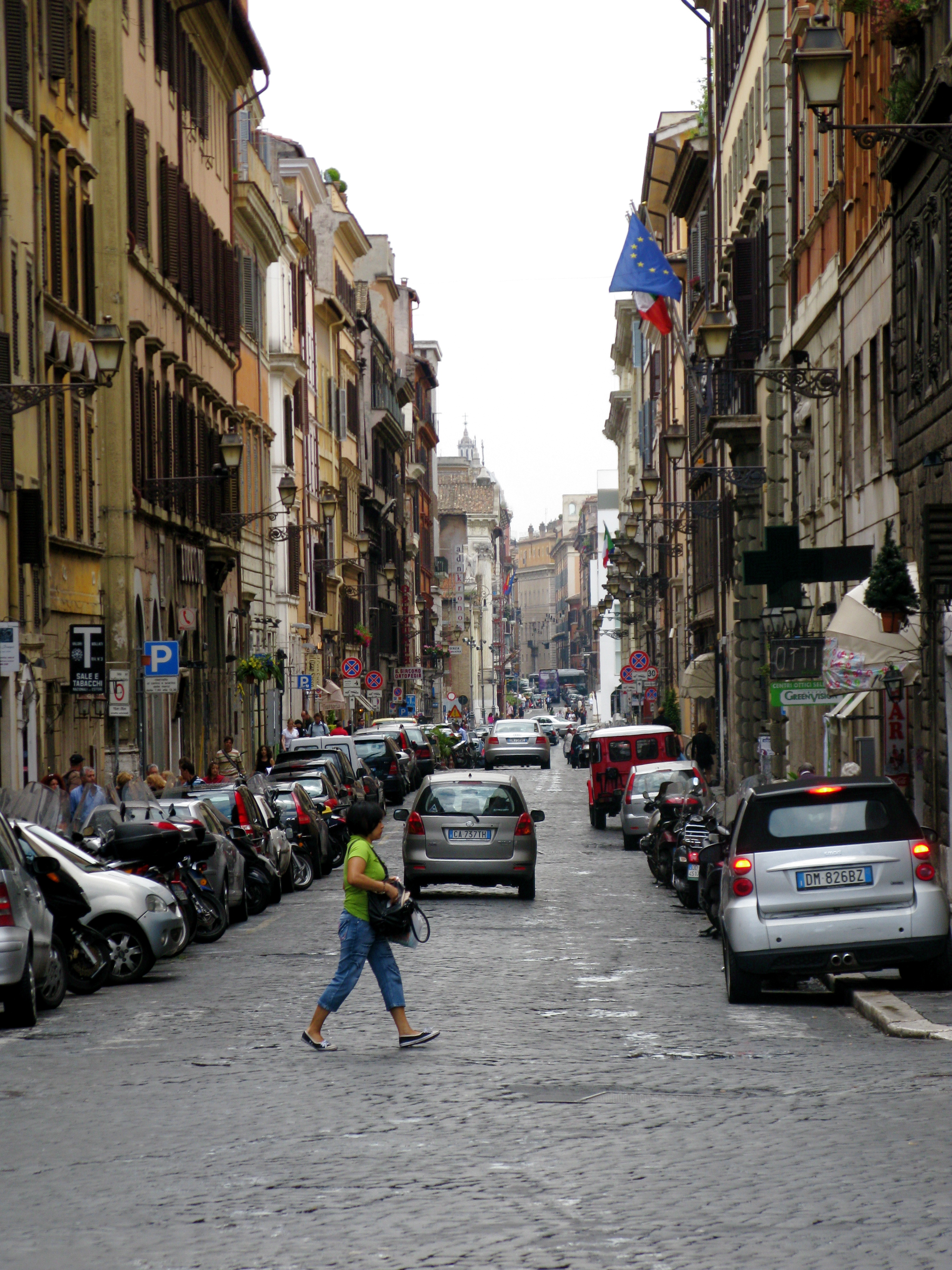
Via di Ripetta

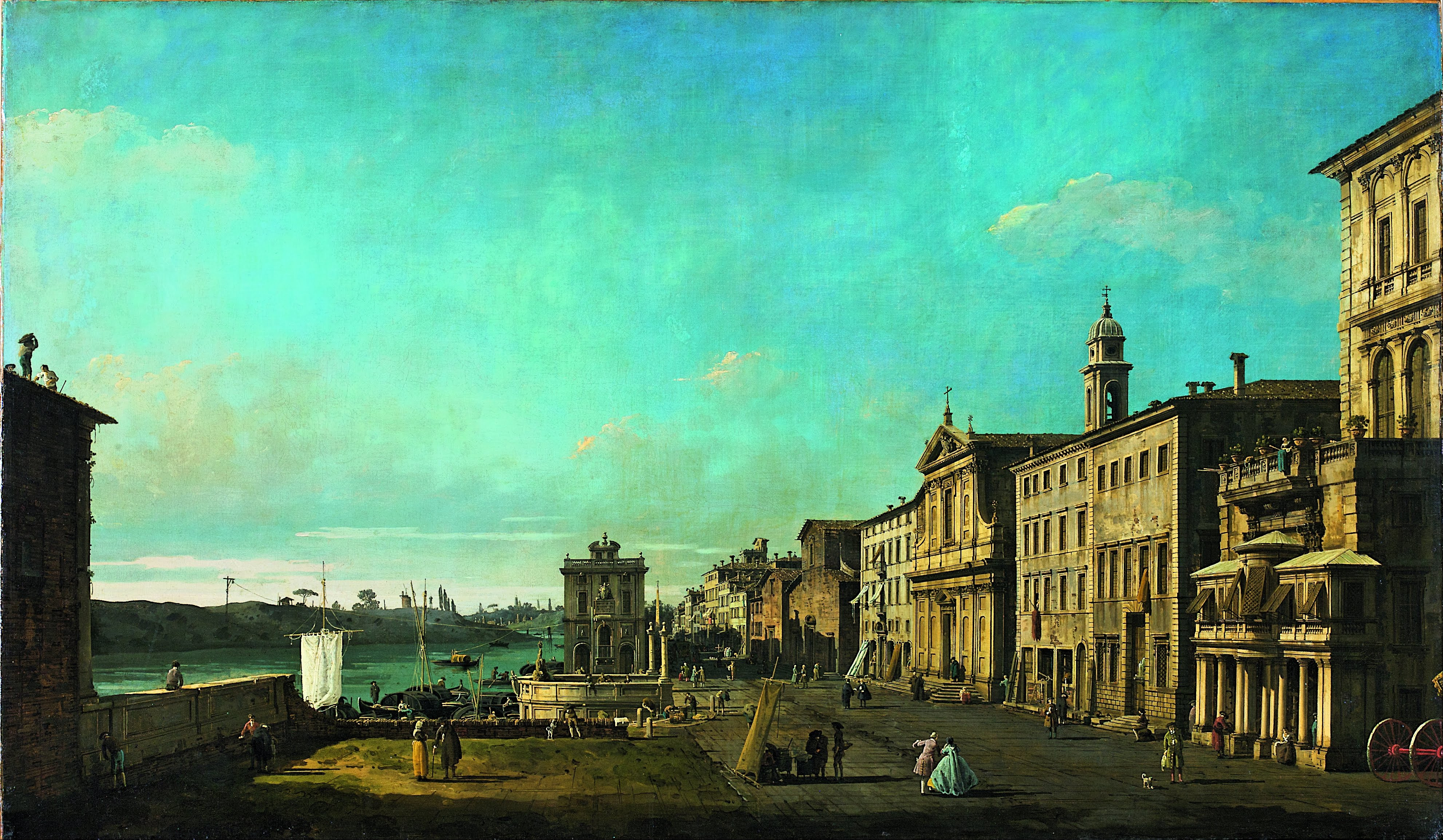
Via di Ripetta in a painting by Bernardo Bellotto (18th century)

Via di Ripetta, also called Via Ripetta, is a street in the historic centre of Rome (Italy), in the rione Campo Marzio, that links Piazza del Popolo to Via del Clementino and, with other toponyms (Via della Scrofa, Via della Dogana Vecchia), reaches the church of Sant'Ivo alla Sapienza, on the back of Piazza Sant'Eustachio and close to the Pantheon. It is part of the complex of streets known as Tridente.

== History ==
The street boasts very ancient origins: in fact it retraces a former road map dating back to the 1st century BC. At the beginning of the 16th century the street was adapted by Pope Leo X, from which it took the name of Via Leonina. The street took the present name in 1704, when the Porto di Ripetta was built: the river harbour was called ripetta ("little bank") in order to distinguish it from the Porto di Ripa Grande in Trastevere. Via di Ripetta is mentioned in the novel "The Late Mattia Pascal" by Luigi Pirandello, as a temporary residence of Adriano Meis / Mattia Pascal.

== Main sights ==
Walking through the street from Piazza del Popolo to Piazza Augusto Imperatore, which holds the ruined Mausoleum of Augustus, the following historic structures can be seen:

- Palazzo Capponi della Palma (16th century)
- Conservatorio della Divina Provvidenza e di San Pasquale (17th century)
- Sala Lancisiana of San Giacomo in Augusta (16th century)
- Chiesa di Santa Maria Portae Paradisi (16th century)
- Accademia di Belle Arti di Roma (19th century)
- Liceo Artistico Ripetta (19th century)

Along the street, commemorative stones signal the birthplaces of Eleonora Fonseca Pimentel and of Angelo Brunetti (1800-1849), Italian patriot known as Ciceruacchio.
