= Conservatore of Rome =

Magistrate in medieval Rome

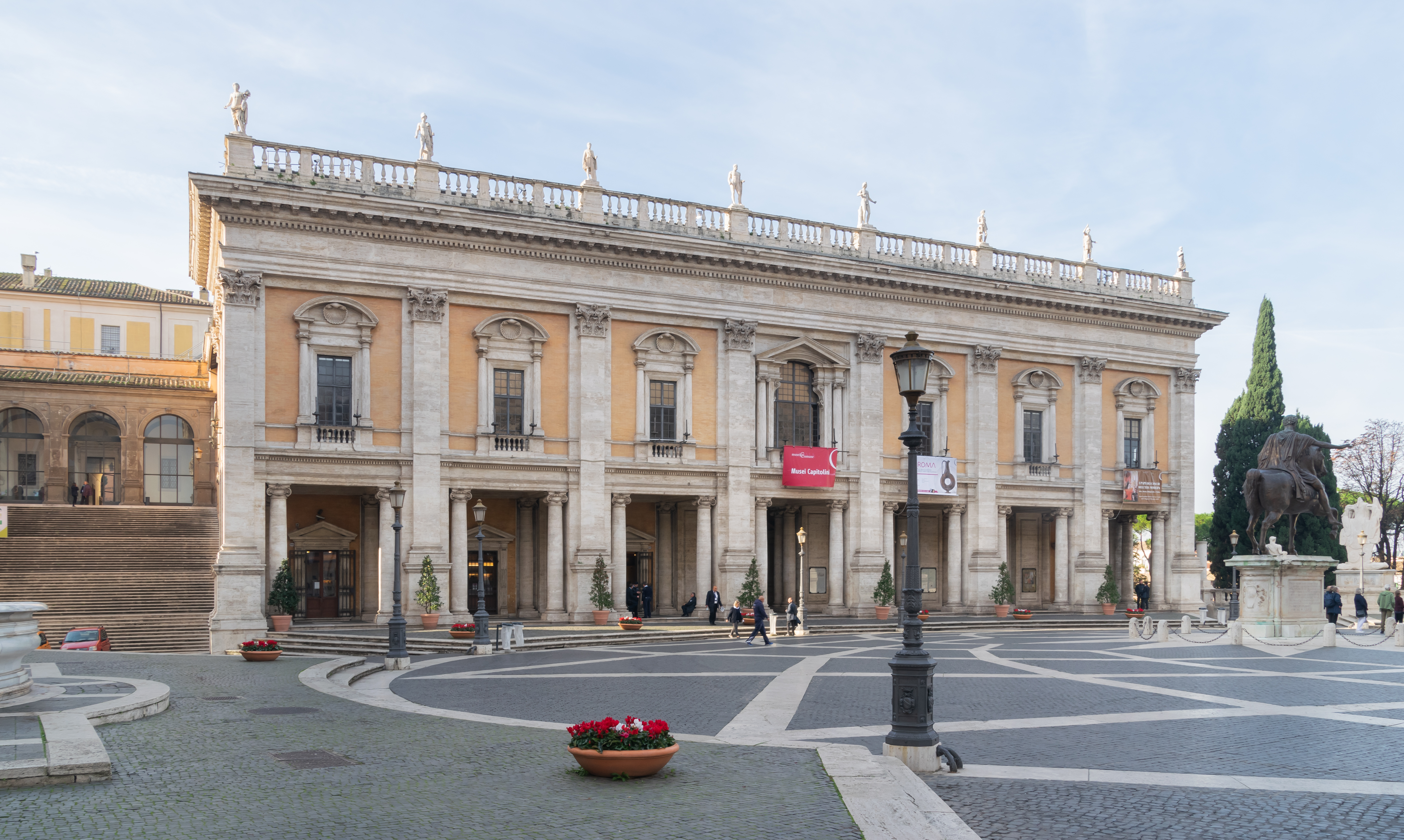
The Palazzo dei Conservatori, named after the conservatori

A Conservatore of Rome (Italian: Conservatore di Roma) (Note: Sometimes also known as a Conservatore of the Capitoline Camera (Italian - Conservatore della Camera Capitolina) or collectively as 'conservatori of the chamber of the mother city (Latin - 'Conservatores Camerae Alme Urbis) or Conservatori of the Roman people (Italian - Conservatori del popolo romano)) was one of three magistrates in medieval Rome, dividing power on the model of the ancient Roman consuls. Together with the Prior of the Caporioni, these three men formed the Roman Magistracy (il Magistrato Romano), the executive power in the city of Rome between the 13th century and the end of the papacy's temporal power in 1870. Their name is referred to the duty they have to overview and "preserve" the law (Statuta) of the city, together with the preservation of the monuments.

The main tasks in which the Conservatori were involved were in accounting supervision of the Comune and to serve a special Tribunal for economic crimes. They have indeed a supervision duties for the public security in the main public ceremonies, like the Carnevale Romano and the proclamation of the new Pope. They were in charge of the decision to confer the Roman citizenship to the newcomers. The Conservatori were elected randomly for their temporary office amongst the Patrizi of the city.

== Bibliography (in Italian) ==
- Michele Franceschini, "I conservatori della Camera Urbis: storia di un'istituzione". Il Palazzo dei Conservatori e il Palazzo Nuovo in Campidoglio: momenti di storia urbana di Roma, edited by M. Tittoni (1996): 19-27.
- Daniela Sinisi, Carmen Genovese, Pro Ornatu et Publica Utilitate. L'attività della Congregazione cardinalizia super viis, pontibus et fontibus nella Roma di fine '500, Gangemi Editore S.p.A., 2011.
- Camillo Re, Statuti della città di Roma, tipografia della pace, 1883.
