= Prior of the Caporioni =

The Prior of the Caporioni (Italian - Priore dei Caporioni; Latin - cap. reg. urbis priore) was the caporione or capo rione of rione I of late medieval Rome.

Each of Rome's rioni was led by a caporione, who was supported in his public-order duties by other local citizens on oath known as constables (constabili or capotori). However, the caporione of Rione I was also ex officio a subordinate magistrate under the Conservatori of Rome. Unlike the other caporioni, he also usually came from the Roman urban nobility (patriziato romano). All the other caporioni were abolished in the mid 18th century, but the post of Prior of the Caporioni was only abolished during the reforms of pope Pius IX via a special motu proprio law entitled Structure and municipal organisation and administrative organisation of the city (Struttura e organizzazione municipale e dell'amministrazione degli uffici) dated 1 October 1847.
