= Antonio Maria Salviati =

Florentine cardinal

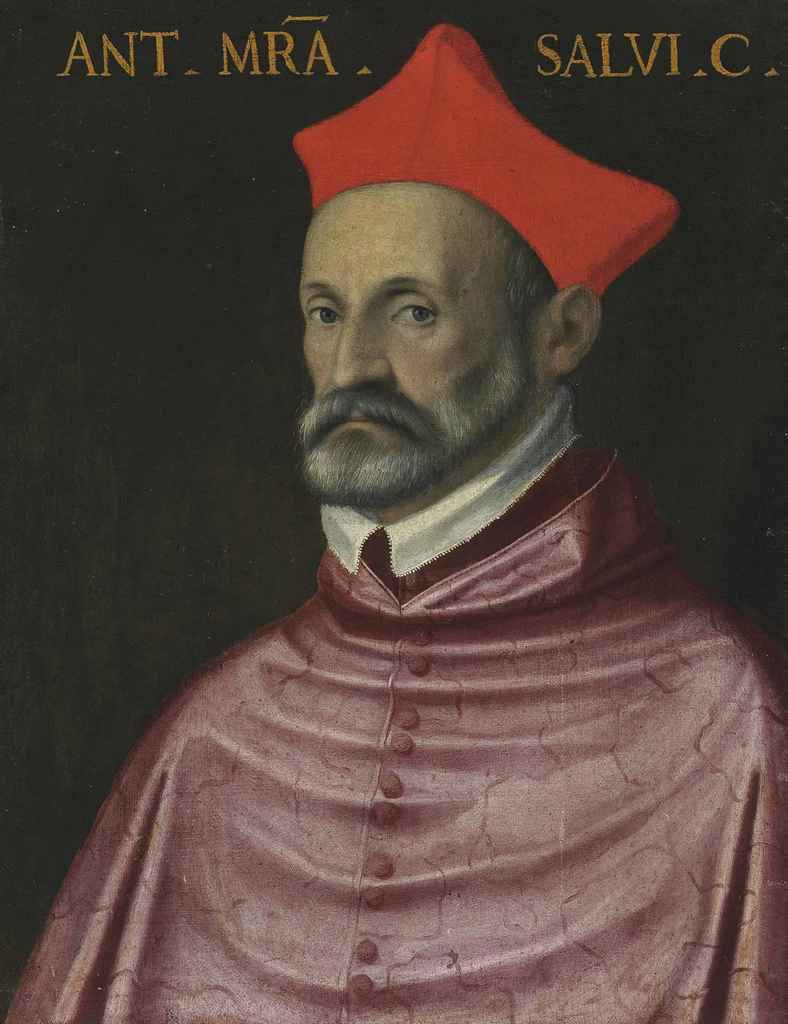
Portrait of Antonio Maria Salviate

Antonio Maria Salviati (21 January 1537 – 26 April 1602) was a Florentine Roman Catholic cardinal.

== Biography ==
Salviati was born in Florence, son of Lorenzo Salviati and Costanza Conti, the nephew of cardinals Bernardo Salviati and Giovanni Salviati. His grandmother was Lucrezia de' Medici, sister of pope Leo X and eldest daughter of Lorenzo il Magnifico.

In 1561 he was appointed as bishop of Saint-Papoul in France, and later was apostolic nuncio in the same country. Pope Gregory XIII created him as cardinal on 12 December 1583. After becoming Cardinal he went in charge of the Ministers to the Sick.

Salviati was mostly known for having been a benefactor. In Rome, he refounded the Arcispedale of San Giacomo degli Incurabili (rebuilding the annexed baroque-style Church of San Giacomo in Augusta) and founded the Collegio Salviati at his own expense at the end of 16th century, then he gifted them to the city of Rome. Other funding from him were towards the Hospital of San Rocco in favor of women in childbirth.

It is notable that Salviati planned a long-term (in his will, forever) financial sustainability of the San Giacomo thanks to the donation from him of a rich property fund. The good properties managing has actually made possible the life of this hospital for centuries.

== Death ==
He died in Rome in 1602 and was buried in San Giacomo in Augusta.

== Bibliography ==
- De Angelis, Pietro (1952). Il Cardinale Antonio Maria Salviati (1536-1602), Benefattore insigne degli Ospedali di San Giacomo in Augusta e di San Rocco. Rome: Ferri. OCLC 14542890.
- Di Castro, Francesca (2009). "L'Ospedale di San Giacomo degli Incurabili". Strenna dei Romanisti. Rome: Gruppo dei Romanisti.
