= Dirk Ameyden =

Journalist from the Low Countries (1586–1656)

Dirk Ameyden or Teodoro Amideno (1586–1656) was a canonist and journalist from the Low Countries who was active in 17th-century Rome.

== Life ==
Ameyden was born in 's-Hertogenbosch, in the Duchy of Brabant, the son of Gerrit Ameyden and Maria a Camper. From 1598, he served as a page to Cardinal Andrew of Austria, in whose entourage he travelled to Constance in 1599 and to Rome in 1600. He returned to Rome in 1604 to study at the Collegium Romanum. His uncle, Christiaan Ameyden, a singer in the Sistine Chapel Choir, died in 1605, leaving Dirk a house on the Via Condotti. Dirk remained a layman and in 1606 married the Roman Barbara Fabrini, later building a family home on Via di Monte Giordano. He graduated in canon law in 1607 and began working as a curial advocate, building up a successful legal practice in the Roman congregations.

Ameyden was closely involved in the Dutch-Flemish community in Rome, especially with the hospital of Santa Maria dell'Anima, a 14th-century Dutch foundation, on the board of which he served. From 1630, he was a legal and political agent of the Spanish crown in Rome. He had a wide circle of friends among writers and artists, giving some of his letters particular interest to art history and literary history.

In 1630, Ameyden became involved in the trial of Orazio Morandi, a personal friend who was imprisoned for having forecast Pope Urban VIII's death in a newsletter. Ameyden himself produced avvisi and became regarded as one of the leading gazzettanti of his day. In 1637, he orchestrated public celebrations in Rome of the election of Ferdinand III as King of the Romans.

In 1654, he printed a book about the Apostolic Dataria without an imprimatur, which led to his being imprisoned by the Roman Inquisition and banished from the Papal States by Pope Innocent X. He was able to return to Rome the following year, after Innocent's death, but he himself died within a year of that, on 30 January 1656. He was buried in Santa Maria dell'Anima.

== Writings ==
Ameyden was a prolific writer, producing numerous manuscripts, letters, and diaries that are preserved in several Italian repositories. Very little of his writing was ever printed. Best known are his Diario della citta e corte di Roma, written under the pen name Deon Hora Temedio and covering the years 1640–1650, and his La Storia delle Famiglie Romane, published in Rome in two volumes in 1910–1914. He also translated a number of plays from Spanish.

His Relazione della città e corte di Roma, written to brief the Marquis of Leganés, Governor of the Duchy of Milan, was later included in Li Tesori della Corte Romana (Brussels, 1672).

- Trattato della natura del vino: e del ber caldo e freddo (Rome, Giacomo Mascardi, 1608)
- Tractatus de officio et jurisdictione Datarii (Venice, 1654)
