= San Giacomo degli Incurabili =

Historical hospital in Rome

Coordinates: 41°54′31″N 12°28′51″E

Ospedale di San Giacomo degli Incurabili
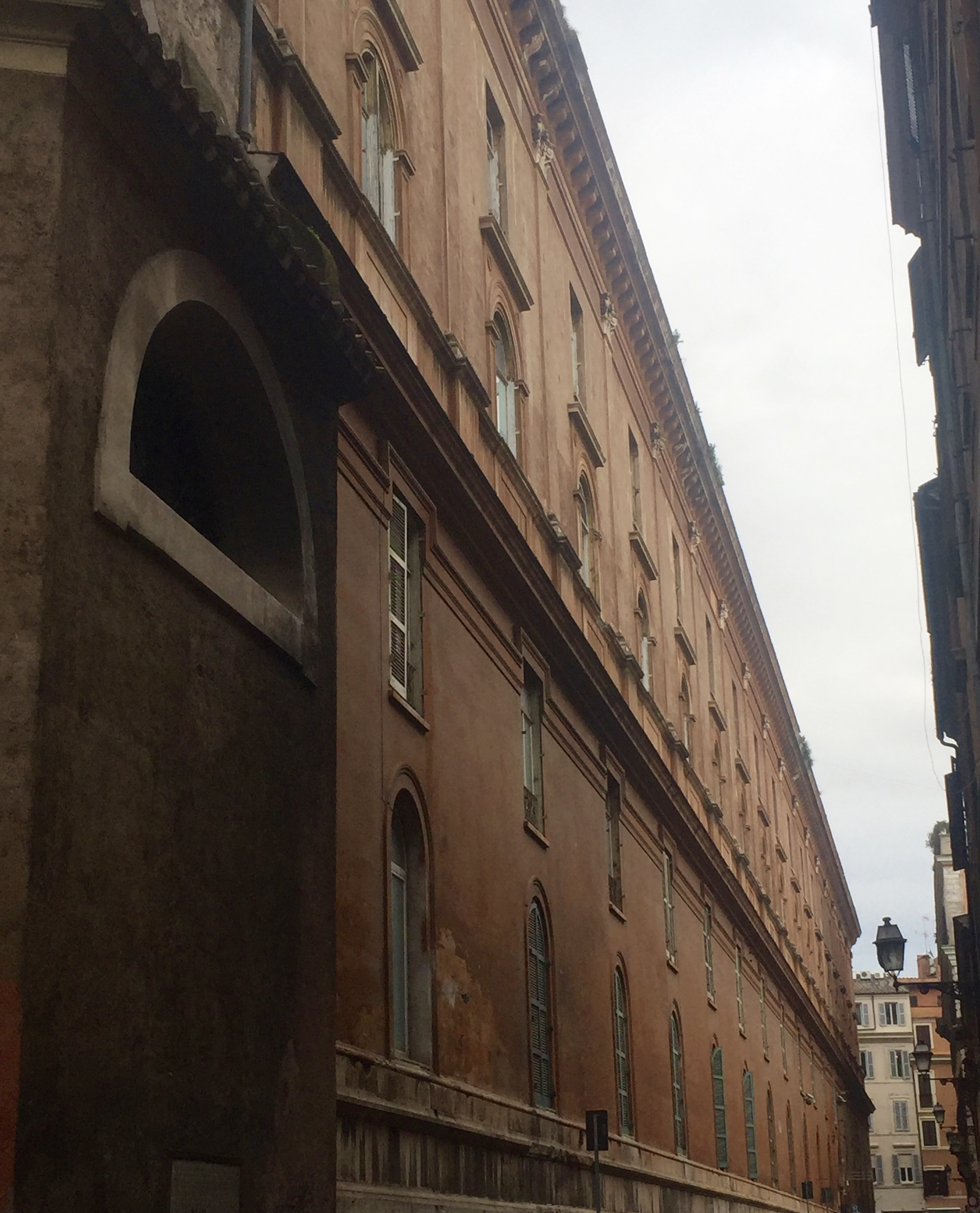
- Southern façade of the Hospital San Giacomo

Geography
- Location: Lazio, Italy, IT

Organisation
- Care system: Sistema Sanitario Nazionale
- Type: General
- Patron: Saint James

Services
- Emergency department: Yes
- Beds: 170 (2008)

History
- Founded: 1338
- Closed: 2008

The hospital of San Giacomo in Augusta (Saint James in Augusta), also known as San Giacomo degli Incurabili (Saint James of the Incurables), was a historic hospital located in Rome.

== History ==
The Hospital was built for the first time in 1349 by the Colonna family for the will of the cardinal Pietro Colonna in honor of his uncle Giacomo Colonna, as stated in a memorial stone in one of the cortili. Leo X expressed in three apostolic letters between 1515 and 1516 his will to rebuild the hospital to help the pilgrims, the poor and especially the "incurables" not accepted from the other hospitals. Leo X mentioned in particular the fight against syphilis as a priority to be set on the hospital's activity. That was a new illness that spread to Europe from the Americas at the end of the 15th century and that was taken to Italy from the troops of the French king Charles VIII of France. In those same years, Girolamo Fracastoro, a pioneer of the modern pathology, proposed a cure for syphilis, the expensive Lignum vitae, that was soon offered to the patients of San Giacomo for free. In fact, the Statuta of San Giacomo was towards receiving patients of all economic conditions of both sexes for free, even for this very expensive cure.

The building activity on the properties of San Giacomo shaped the Tridente. The hospital was rebuilt in the second half of 16th century mainly by the activity of cardinal Antonio Maria Salviati, together with the Church San Giacomo in Augusta, ended in the year 1600. The hospital was starting to be funded by a little percentage from the public fundings, but for the major part from donations by privates: in the 16th century the major donations came from the Pope Paul IV, from cardinal Bartolomé de la Cueva y Toledo with the enormous expense of 80.000 scudi and cardinal Clemente d'Olera with his entire heritage. The donations often consisted in properties, whose incomes were aimed to cover the costs of the hospitality, as done also by Salviati himself with the constitution of a fund bundled to assure incomes to the hospital for the forever future. The condition of the donation of Salviati was confirmed in 1610 by the papal bull in form of motu proprio by the pope Paulus V.

During the 16th century Camillus de Lellis was active in the Hospital. After his conversion to christianity, he reformed the rules of the Hospital itself and established a new religious nursing system, the Order of the Ministers of the Sick also known as "Camillians". After his death, he was declared Saint by the Catholic Church and protector of hospitality. Other notable saints from this century that were also active here were Filippo Neri, Gaetano Thiene and Felice da Cantalice.

During the 17th century was active here also the surgeon Bernardino Genga, tho whom was intitled one Galleria inside the hospital. In 1780 Pius VI built the round-shaped room with Anatomical theatre in the Sala Lancisiana, named after the surgeon Giovanni Maria Lancisi.

In 1815, Pius VII set here the new chair of Surgery of Università La Sapienza. Its first director was the surgeon Giuseppe Sisco. At his death in 1830, Sisco donated his books to the hospital, his surgical instruments and instituted a prize for students. In 1833 Paolo Maria Martinez donated 12 000 scudi to the hospital for sickbeds, as reported on an inscription in the Hospital itself.

In the mid-19th century the Pope Gregory XVI made some major rebuilding work on the hospital structure, with the help of both public and personal economic funding. A number of donors enabled the Hospital to face the strong expenses of public health thanks to the properties they gave it during the centuries. Also in those years, the San Giacomo continued to host patients senza cercarsi l'età, la patria, la condizione, la religione del chiedente (without looking at the age, the country, the status, the religion of the petitioner).

In the years following the Capture of Rome and the union of the City to the Kingdom of Italy in 1870, from 1896, the property of the Hospital was transferred to the Italian state-owned institution Pio Istituto di Santo Spirito e Ospedali Riuniti di Roma, the new owner of all the public Italian hospitals in Rome not owned by the Church.

In the 20th century the hospital was still in full activity. At the end of the century, the building included the biggest Emergency department in the city center of Rome, that server an area of 400.000 residents and people who commute into the city center - but also a large number of tourists out of this number should be taken into account.

On 21 December 1980, the Pope John Paul II visited the hospital.

In October 2008, after 680 years of continuous activity, the hospital was abruptly closed by a regional law issued in August 2008 where the president of the Lazio region Piero Marrazzo was serving as Commissario ad acta. The Lazio region, the new owner of the palace after the city of Rome, is now discussing to open commercial activity in place of public hospitality. Since 2008, the noblewoman Oliva Salviati, descendant of the founder, claims to enforce the testament of his ancestor cardinal Anton Maria Salviati, who donated the building to the city under the strict condition of its use as a hospital: it followed a petition of 60.000 subscribers to keep active the hospital.

== Controversies ==
Starting from the 16th century, the hospital was gifted of a solid property fund by the Roman nobility in order to allow the hospital itself to self-finance and to make the cure available also to the poor. This system has been worked well until the end of the 20th century, but in 2008 the Italian business newspaper Il Sole 24 Ore claimed that between 2004 and 2007 a major part of this fund, consisting of 950 buildings, was sold underpriced in non-transparent process resulting in a damage of the civic health system sustainability, despite the obligations under many donations.

The main building of the hospital is still tied to hospital use, thanks to the claims of the Salviati family.

On October 31, 2008, the closing date, the police came into the hospital, causing 4 people injured.

On April 7, 2021 the Consiglio di Stato (Council of State) sentenced that the closing of San Giacomo was "illegitimate" according to the italian law, as a result of the long legal dispute with Oliva Salviati. On the 13 February 2023 the Supreme Court of Cassation definitively confirmed the previous sentence.

Hospital of St. James of the Incurables (San Giacomo degli Incurabili)
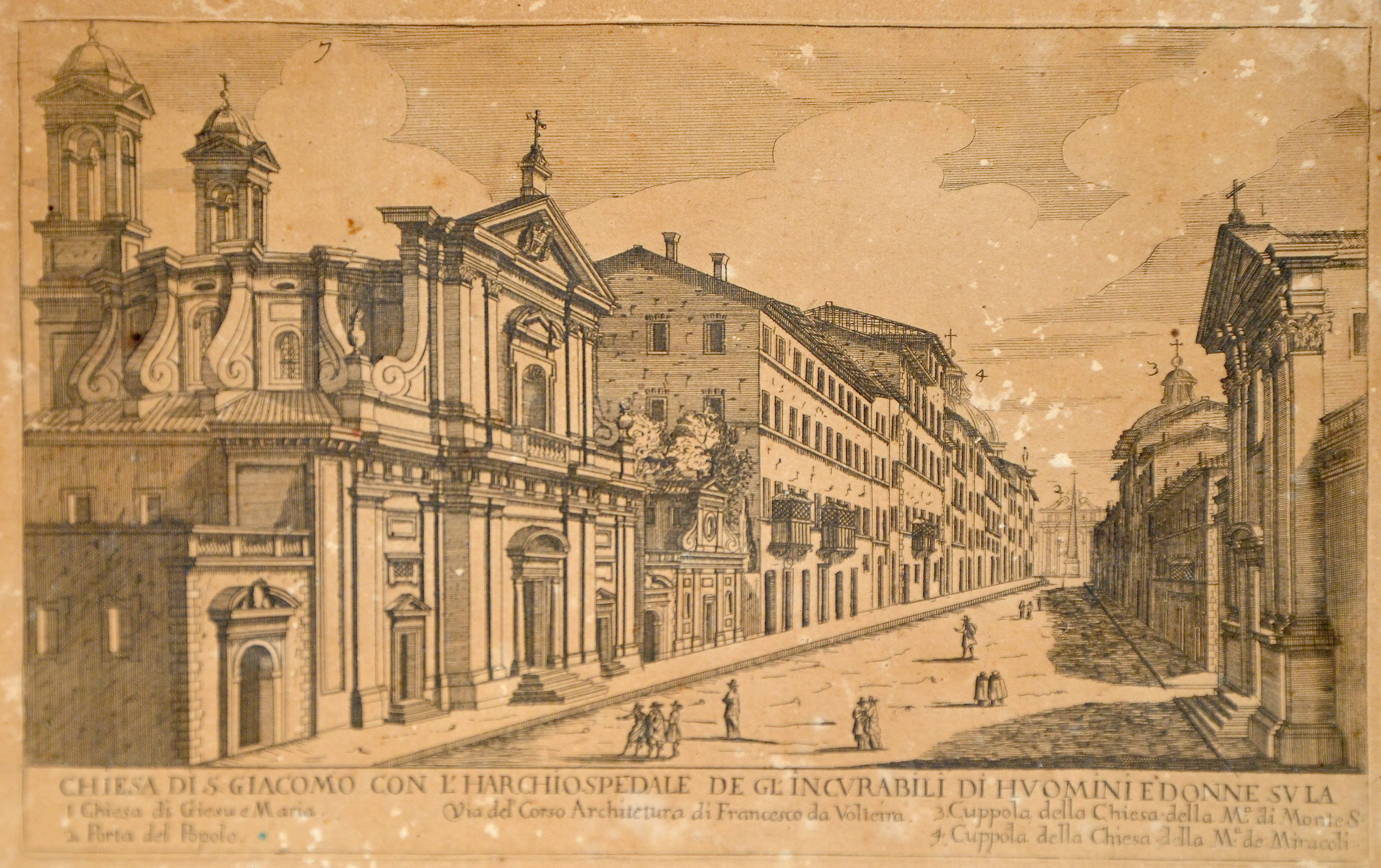
Church and Hospital of San Giacomo on the Corso in the 18th century

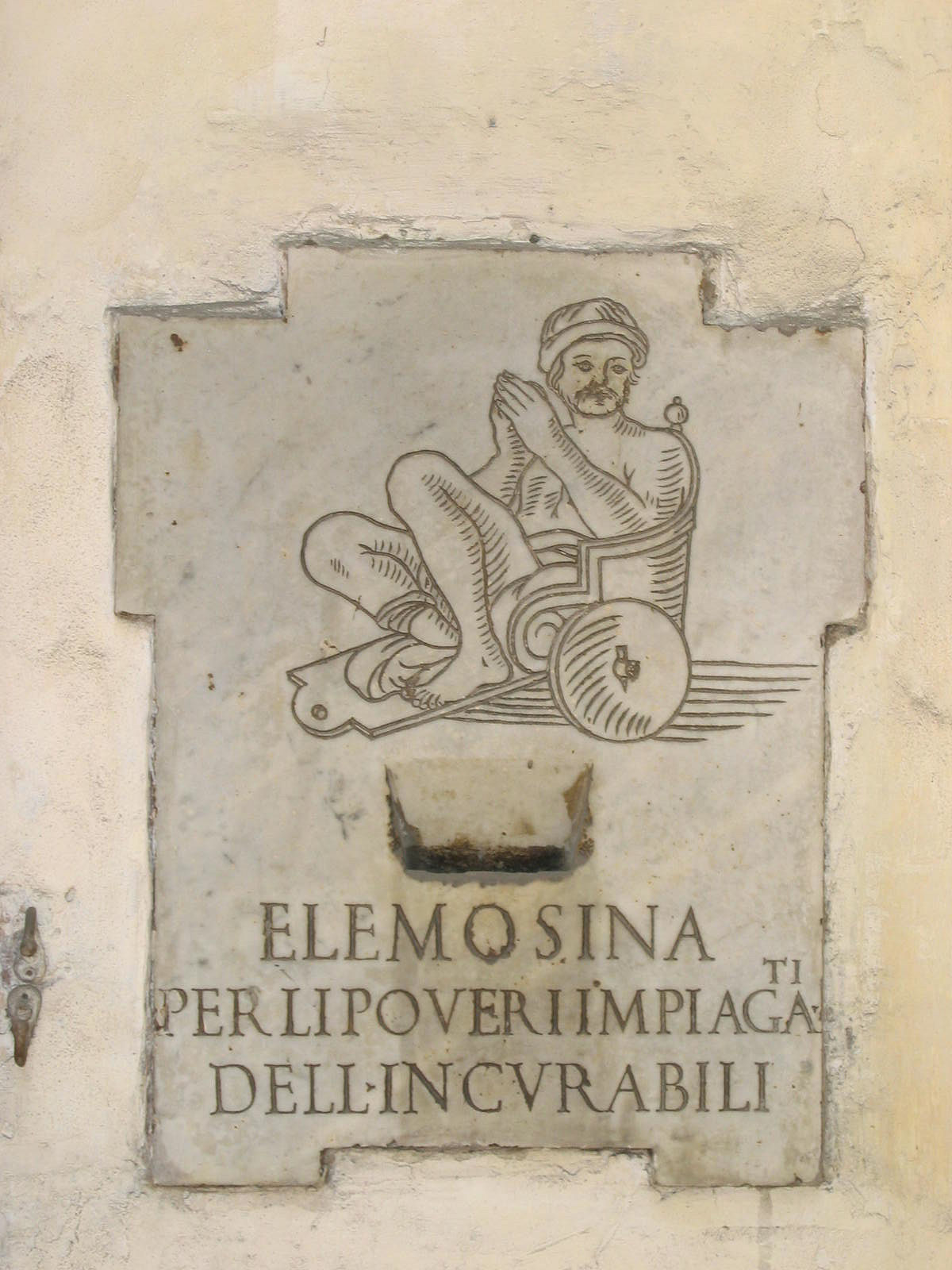
Elemosiniera for public charity

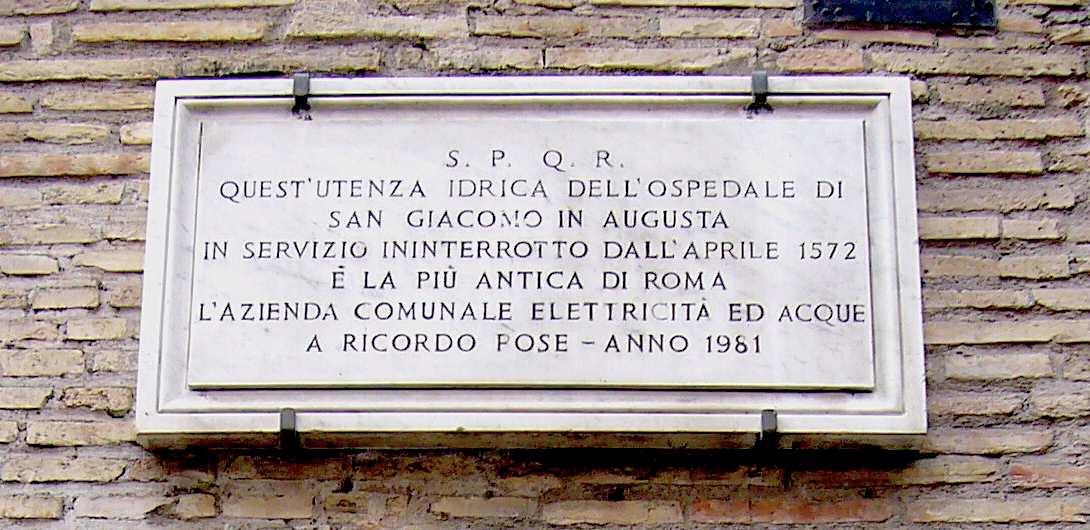
Plaque in honour of the eldest uninterrupted idric service in Rome: 1572 - 1981

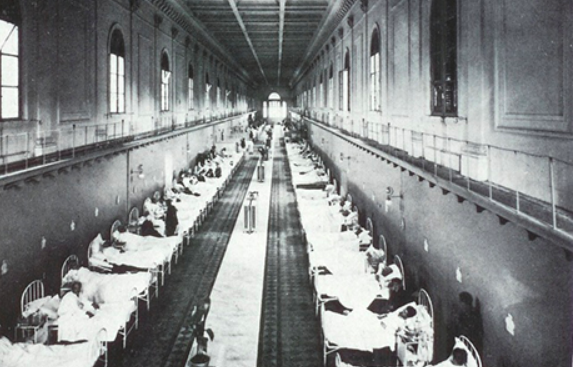
Galleria Genga

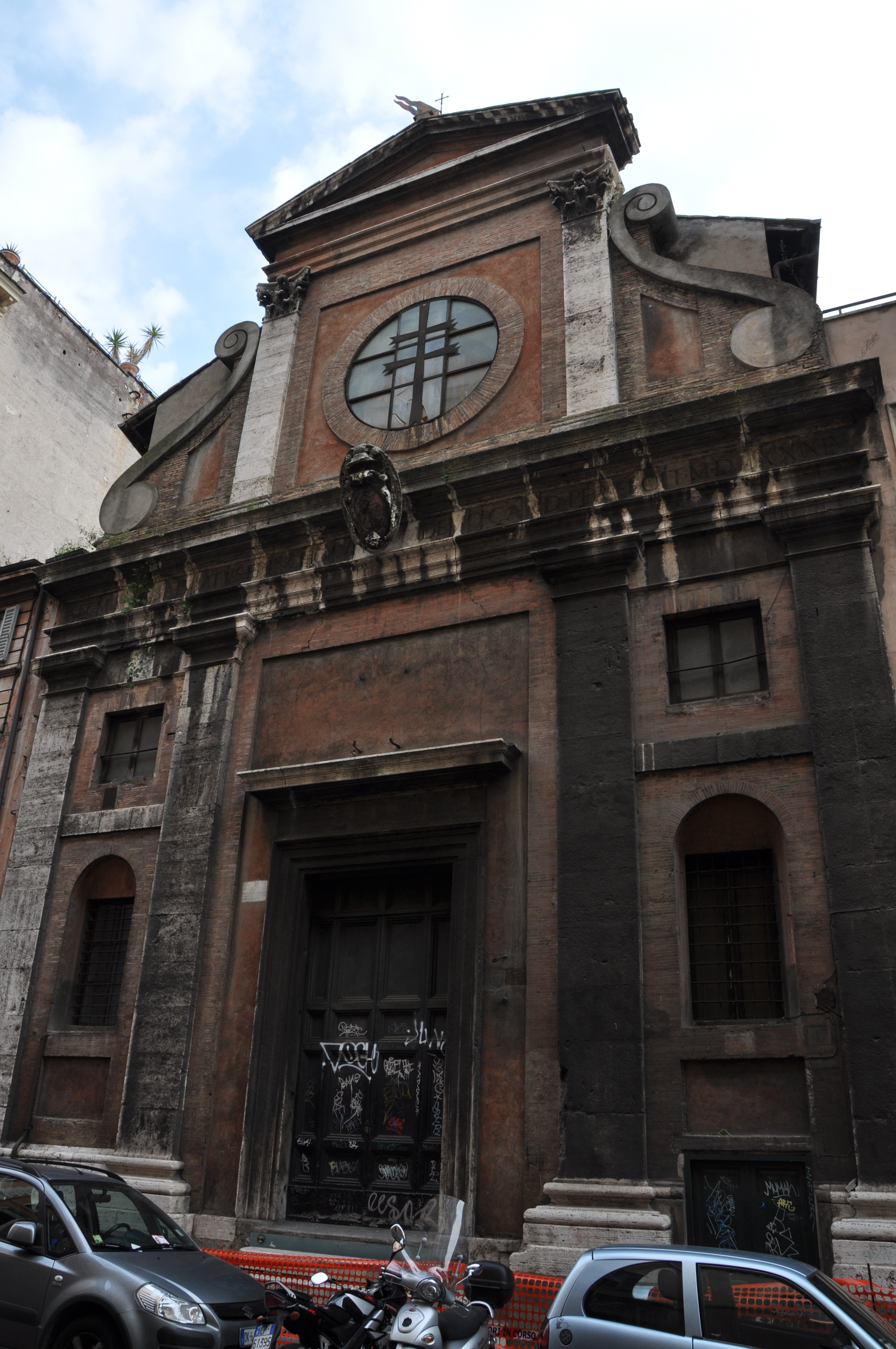
Sala Lancisiana

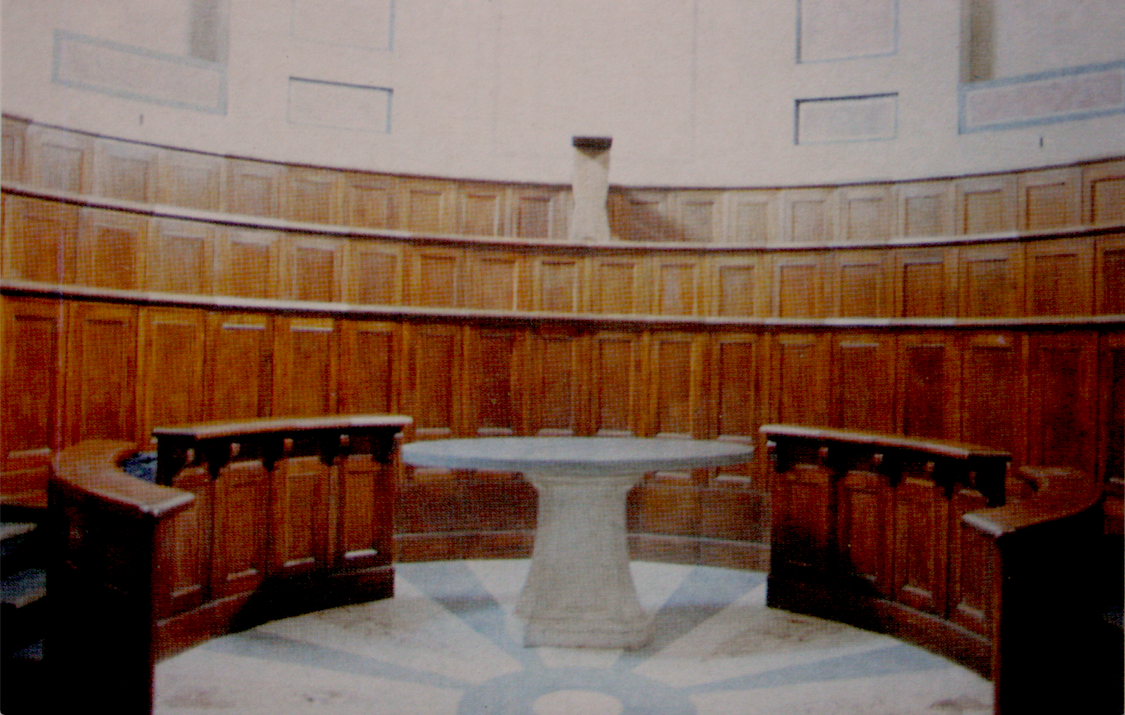
Anatomical theatre

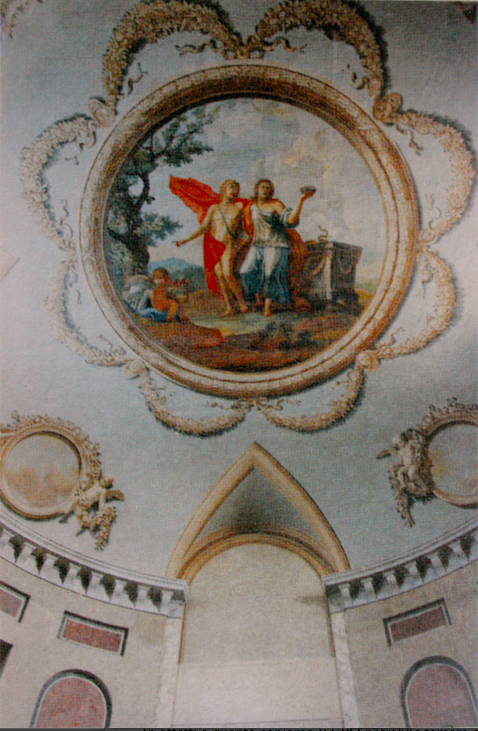
Anatomical theatre: frescos

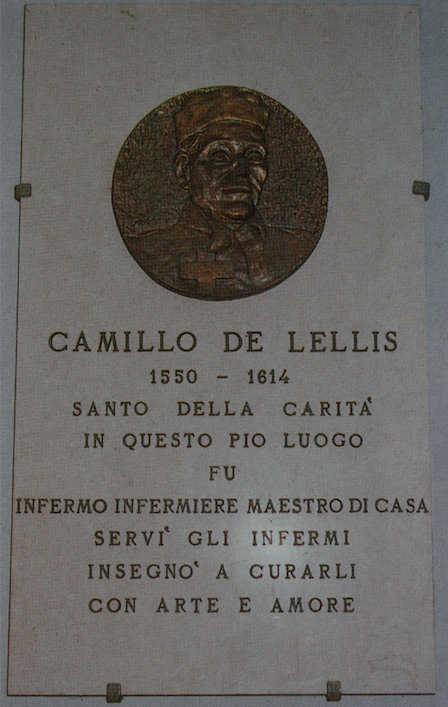
Plaque of Camillo de Lellis inside the hospital
Patrons
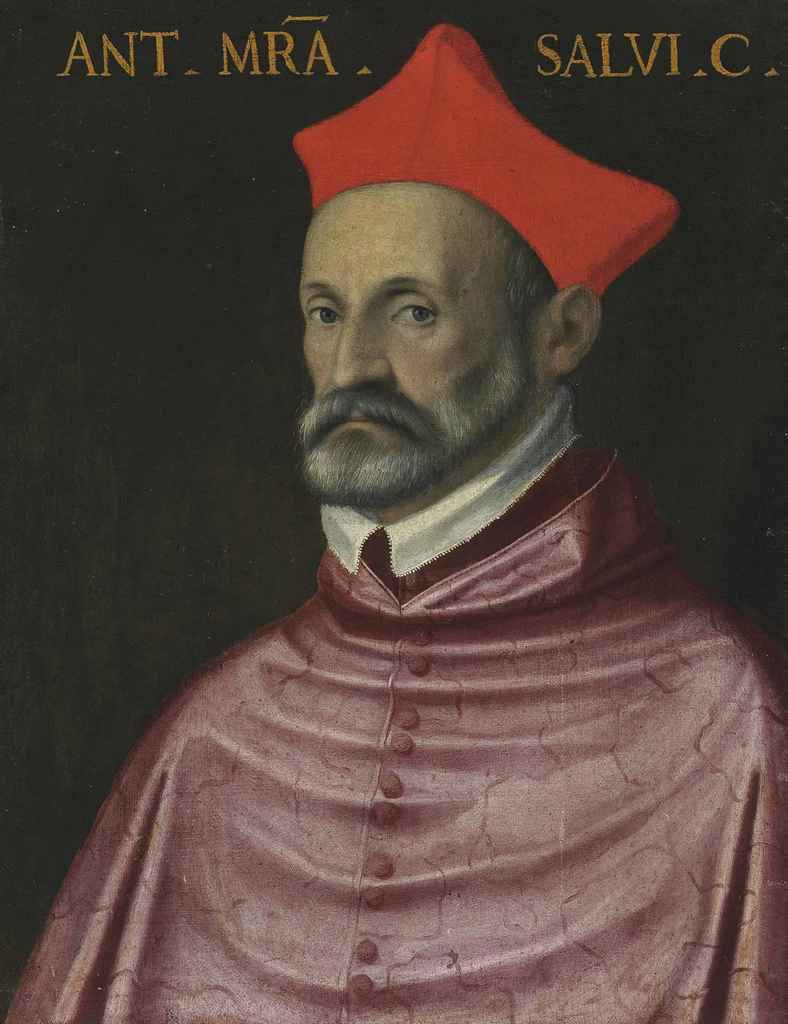
Anton Maria Salviati

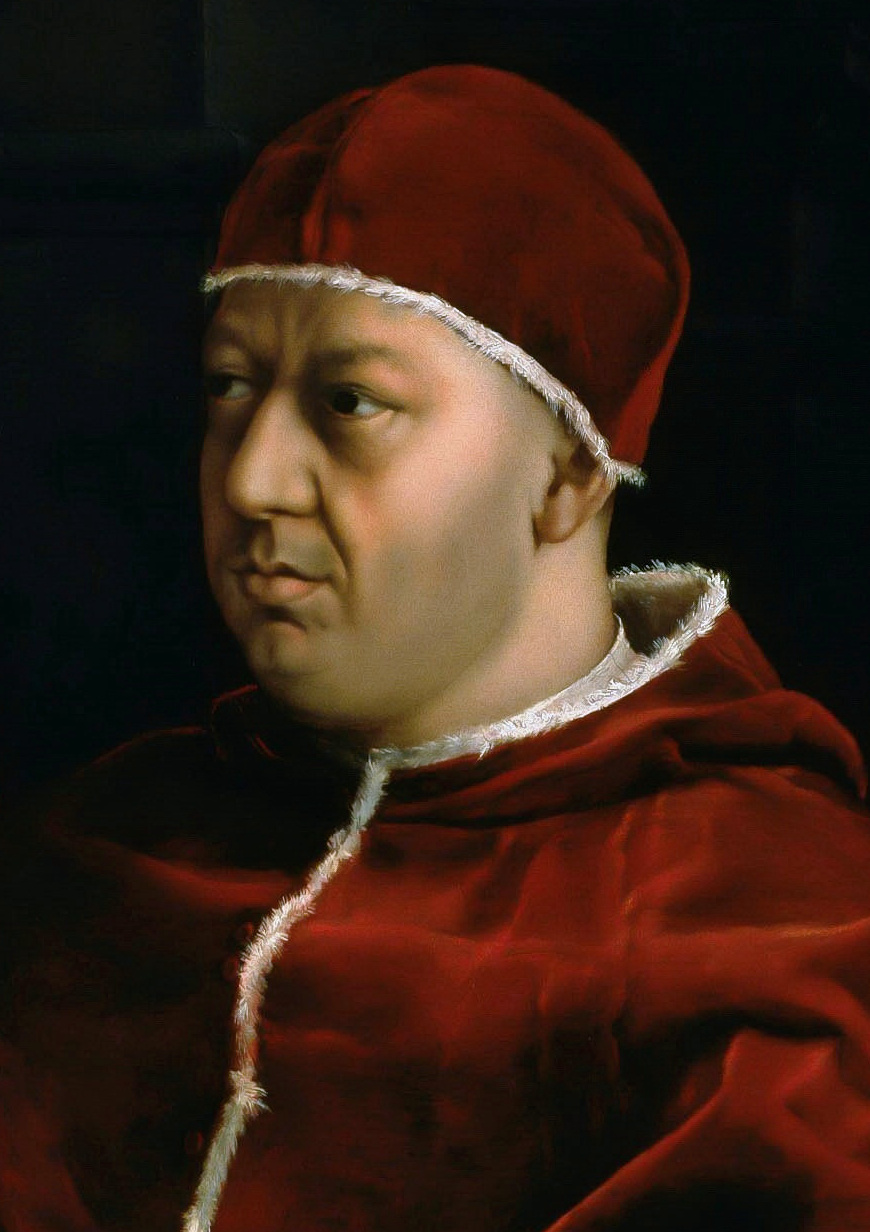
Pope Leo X

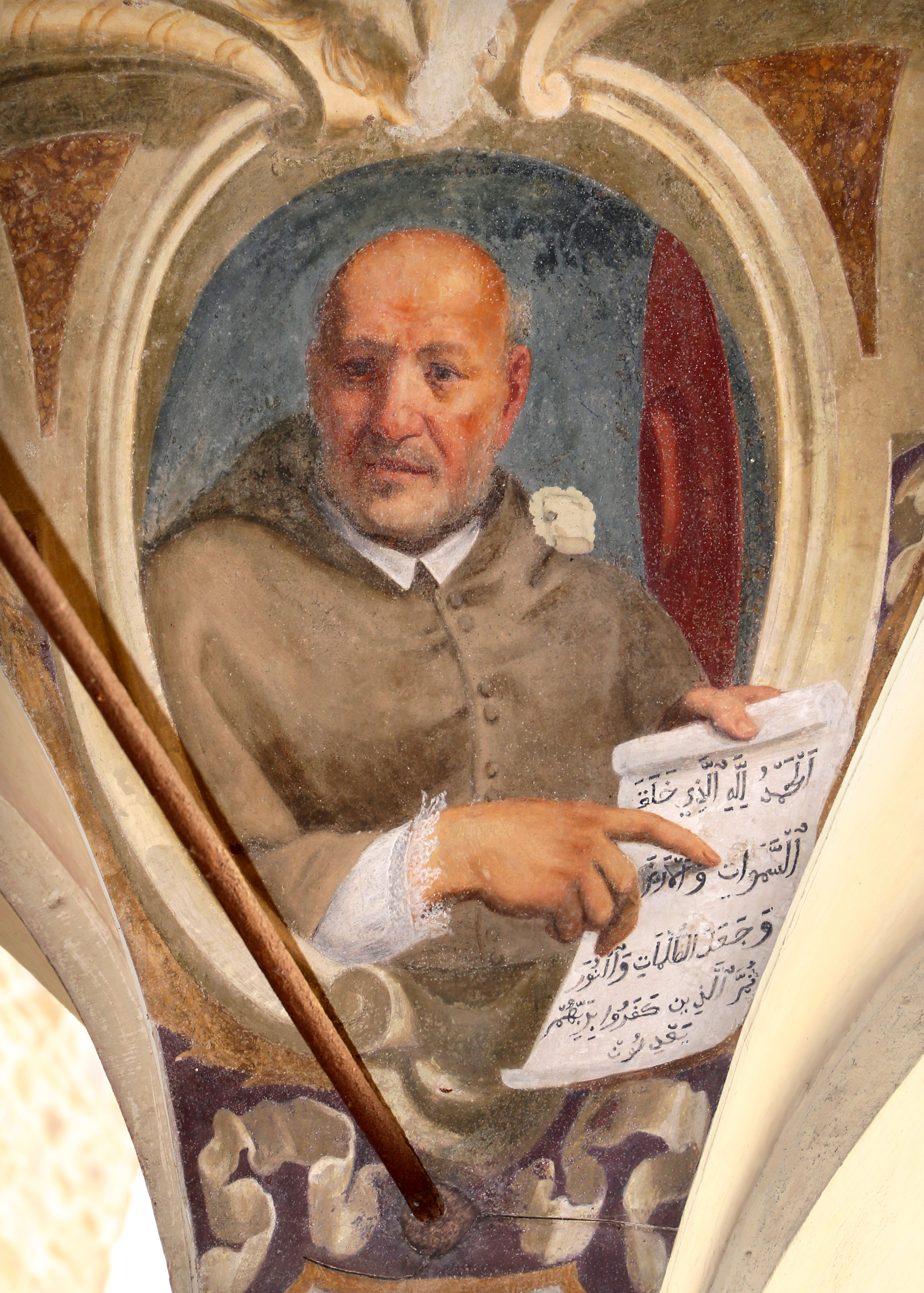
Clemente d'Olera

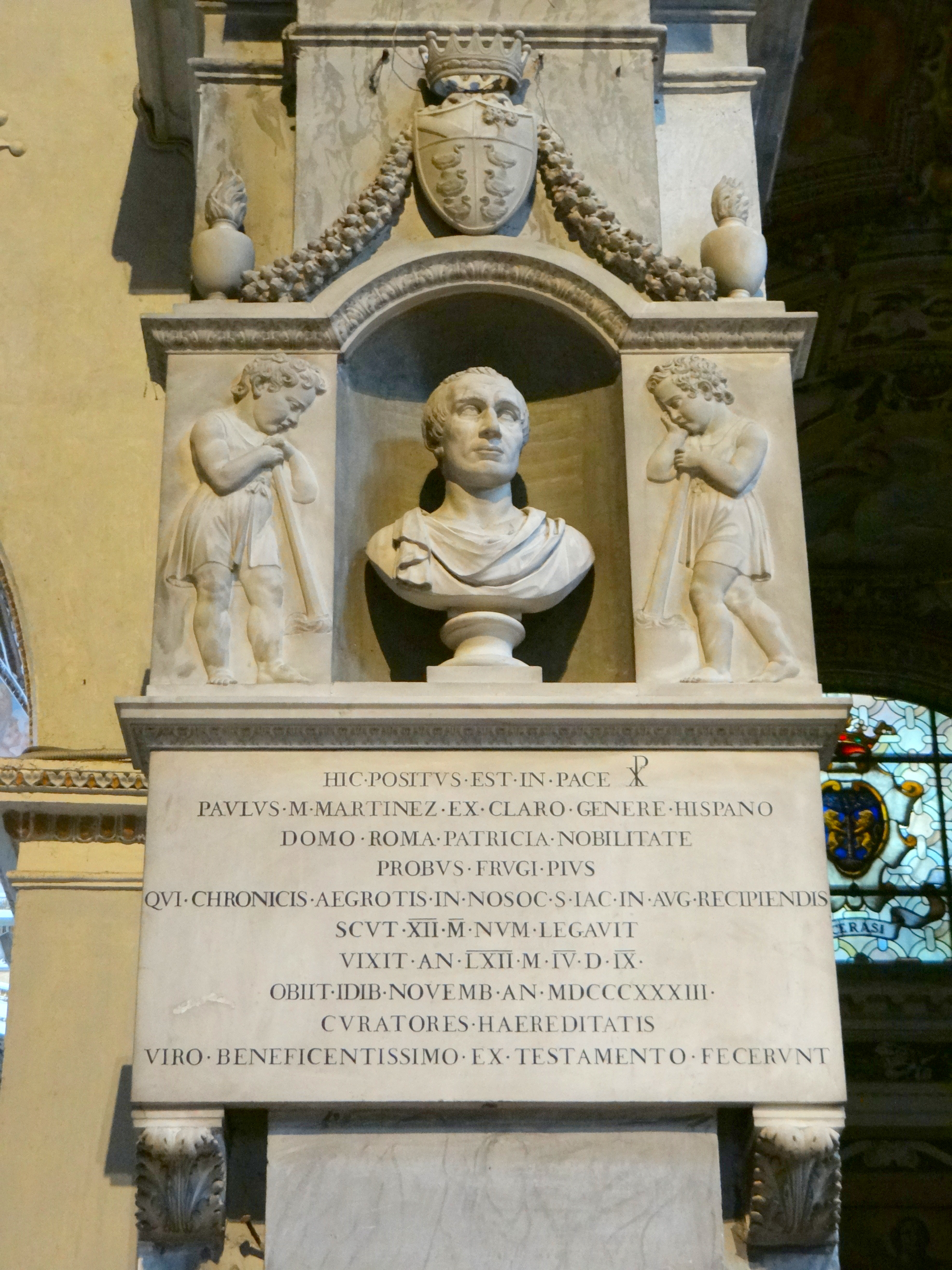
Paolo Maria Martinez

== See also ==
- Sala Lancisiana of Saint James in Augusta
- History of syphilis
- History of hospitals

== Bibliography ==
- Arrizabalaga, Jon; Henderson, John; French, Roger Kenneth (1997). The Great Pox: The French Disease in Renaissance Europe. Yale University Press.
- Statuti del venerabile archiospidale di San Giacomo in Augusta nominato dell’Incurabili di Roma, Roma, 1659.
- Stefano Ciccolini, Le nuove opere dell'archiospedale di S. Giacomo in Augusta: descritte, Tipografia dell Rev. Cam. Apostolica, 1864.
- Carlo Luigi Morichini, Degl'istituti di pubblica carità ed istruzione primaria e delle prigioni in Roma, Volume 1, Marini, 1842 .
- Lia Bonella, Franca Fedeli Bernardini, L'ospedale dei pazzi di Roma dai papi al '900. Volume II, Bari, Edizioni Dedalo, 1994.
- Padre Sanzio Cicatelli, Vita del P. Camillo de Lellis, a cura di P. Piero Sannazzaro, Roma, Curia Generalizia Camilliani, 1980.
- Enrico Fedele, L'Ospedale San Giacomo in Augusta tra storia, assistenza e cultura, in «Bollettino della scuola medica ospedaliera di Roma e della Regione Lazio», anno IV, numero 9, luglio/settembre 1998.
- Fabio Robotti, Le medaglie pontificie dedicate agli ospedali nella Roma del Papa Re. L'Arciospedale di San Giacomo in Augusta detto anche degli Incurabili, in «Panorama numismatico» n. 260, aprile 2011.
- Mario Massani, L'arcispedale di San Giacomo in Augusta dalle origini ai nostri giorni, Roma, Ed. Tipografia Poliglotta Vaticana, 1983.
- Anna Lio, La chiesa di Santa Maria in Porta Paradisi ed il complesso Ospedaliero del San Giacomo, Roma, Ed. Palombi, 2000.
- Padre Mario Vanti, San Giacomo degl'Incurabili di Roma nel Cinquecento - dalle Compagnie del Divin Amore a S. Camillo de Lellis, Roma, Tip. Rotatori, 1991.
- Pietro De Angelis, L' arcispedale di San Giacomo in Augusta, Tipogr. Ed. Italia, 1955
- Alessandra Cavaterra, L’ospedalità a Roma nell’età moderna: il caso del San Giacomo (1585-1605), Sanità, scienza e storia 2 (1986): 87-123.
- M. Valli, San Giacomo degli incurabili di Roma nel '500, Roma, 1938.
- John Henderson, The mal francese in sixteenth-century Rome: the ospedale di San Giacomo in Augusta and the "incurabili", (1998): 483-523., In: Sonnino, E. (ed.) Popolazione e società a Roma dal medioevo all'età contemporanea. Rome, Italy: Il Calamo, pp. 483–523. ISBN 9788886148498.
- M. Heinz, Das Hospital S. Giacomo in Augusta in Rom: Peruzzi und Antonio da Sangallo i. G. Zum Hospitalbau der Hochrenaissance, in: Storia dell'arte, 1981, n. 41, p. 31-48
- Angela Groppi, I conservatori della virtù: donne recluse nella Roma dei papi, Vol. 2. Laterza, 1994.
- Gaetano Moroni, Ospedali di Roma in Dizionario di erudizione storico-ecclesiastica da S. Pietro sino ai nostri giorni, Vol. 49. Tipografia Emiliana, Venezia, 1848.
- John Henderson, The mal francese in sixteenth-century Rome: the ospedale di San Giacomo in Augusta and the'incurabili, (1998): 483-523.
- John Henderson, The Renaissance hospital: healing the body and healing the soul, Yale University Press, 2006.
- Francesca Romana Stabile, L'ospedale di S. Giacomo in Augusta, dall'assistenza alla cura, in "Ricerche di storia dell'arte" 3/2018, pp. 5–17, doi: 10.7374/92086
- Henderson, J. (2024). "The French Disease in Renaissance Italy: Representation and Experience". Cambridge University Press.
