= Giuseppe Valadier =

Italian architect (1762–1839)

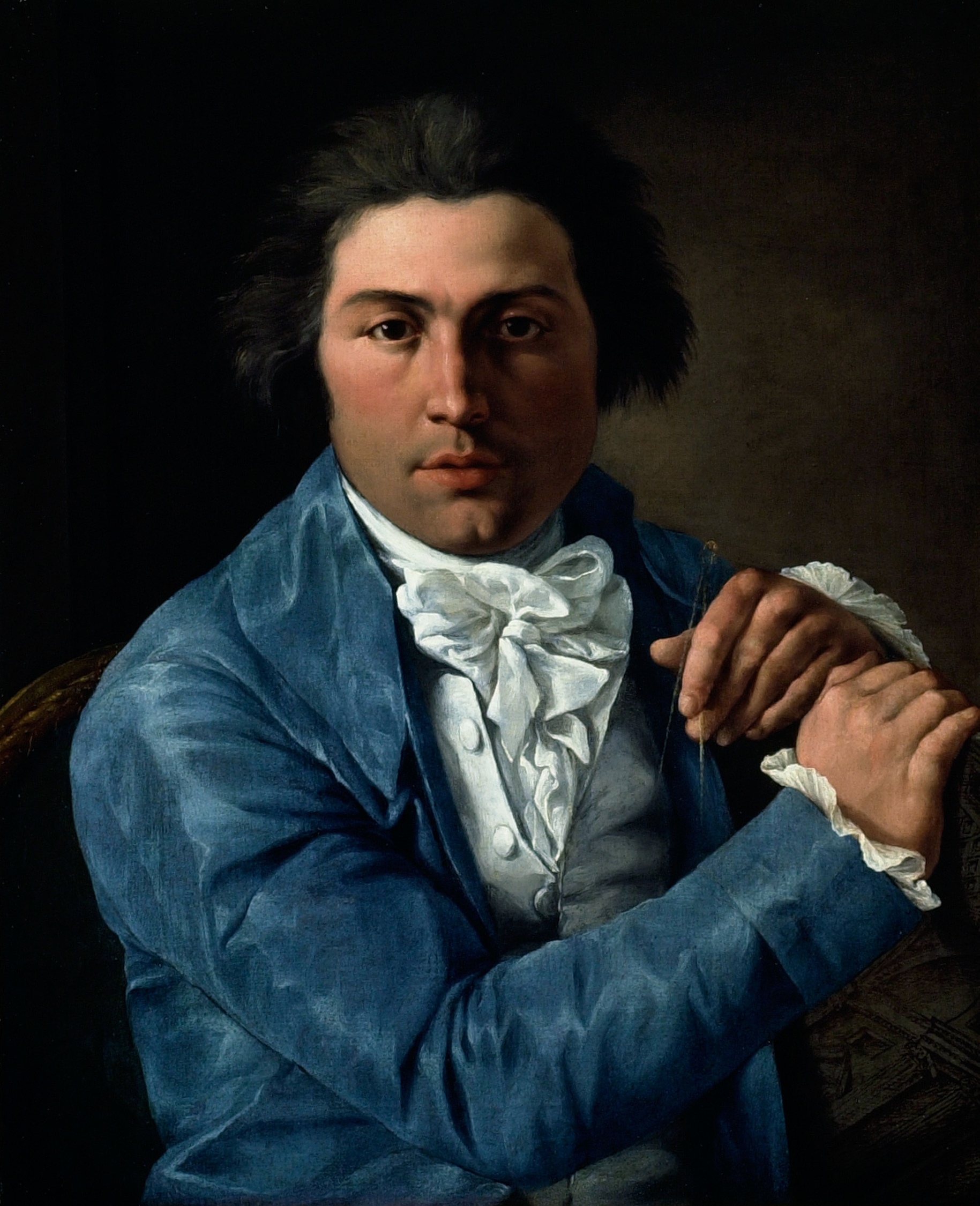
- Pietro Labruzzi, Portrait of the Architect Giuseppe Valadier, Art Institute of Chicago
- Born: April 14, 1762; Rome, Papal States
- Died: February 1, 1839 (aged 76); Rome, Papal States
- Resting place: San Luigi dei Francesi, Rome
- Occupations: Architect; archaeologist
- Movement: Neoclassicism
- Spouse: Laura Campana (m. 1790)

Giuseppe Valadier (Italian pronunciation: [dʒuˈzɛppe valaˈdje]; April 14, 1762 – February 1, 1839) was an Italian architect and designer, urban planner and archaeologist and a chief exponent of Neoclassicism in Italy.

A teacher of architecture at the Accademia di San Luca, Valadier was a pioneer archeologist and a restorer of monuments, such as the Milvian Bridge (1805) and the Arch of Titus in Rome, (1819–21). He retraced the ancient line of the Via Flaminia (1805) and restored Giacomo Barozzi da Vignola's neglected Church of Sant'Andrea in Via Flaminia, which influenced his own Church of Santa Maria della Salute in Fiumicino, the newly-established port for Rome.

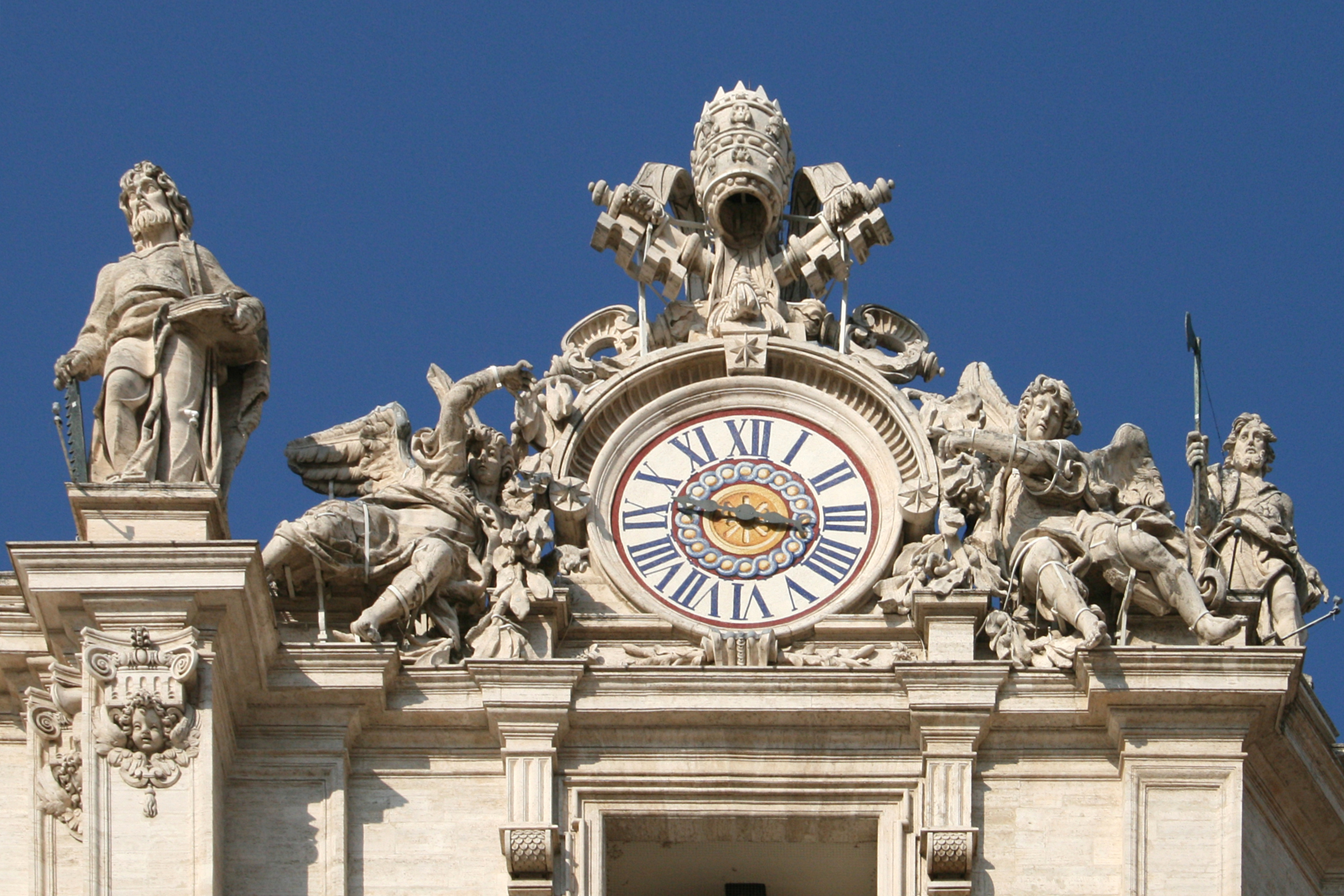
Clock adorning the right side of the front of the St. Peter's Basilica in the Vatican.

== Biography ==
=== Early life and education ===
The son of a goldsmith, Giuseppe Valadier was born in Rome on April 14, 1762. Although he was expected to follow his father’s profession and indeed subsequently took over the family workshop, he pursued his own vocation from an early age. In 1775 he won a prize at the Concorso Clementino of the Accademia di San Luca with a design for a façade for the church of San Salvatore in Lauro, Rome, and two years later, still aged only 15, he won the Concorso Balestra for architecture.

=== Early career ===
In 1781, before he was 20, he was appointed Architetto dei Sacri Palazzi, no doubt assisted by the influence of his father, who enjoyed papal patronage. In the same year he embarked on a study tour that took him north to Milan and France, although it seems he went no further than Marseille. Valadier’s first architectural commission (1784) was from the nobleman Alessandro Pinciani, for a villa and separate chapel at Spoleto. Following the death in 1786 of Carlo Marchionni, Valadier was promoted to the post of Architetto Camerale and coadjutor to St, Peter’s, Rome. He was immediately given the responsibility of overseeing reconstruction following an earthquake in the homeland of Pope Pius VI in the Romagna. The most important of these projects was the rebuilding of Urbino Cathedral, undertaken in collaboration with Camillo Morigia, whose buildings in Ravenna are thought to have had some influence on the young Valadier.

At Urbino, a façade type used several times by Valadier made its first appearance: with its monumental double gable, it was derived from Palladio’s San Giorgio Maggiore (1566), Venice. The large coffers of the interior vault followed the more recent precedent of Giacomo Quarenghi’s internal reconstruction of Santa Scolastica (1771–7) at Subiaco.

In the same period ( 1788–90 ), Valadier submitted designs for the Palazzo Braschi, Rome, to be built on a triangular site that had been acquired by Pope Pius VI. Valadier’s solution to the irregularity of the site was to arrange three blocks at tangents to a central circular courtyard. The less spatially dramatic design of Cosimo Morelli proved a cheaper alternative, however, and was chosen in preference to that of Valadier.

In the 1790s Valadier undertook some religious commissions in the Marche, including the enlargement of the church of Santi Paolo, Pietro e Donato at Mont’Olmo (now Corridonia) and the collegiate church at Monte Sann Pietrangeli, near Macerata. In 1796 he was involved in the first of his numerous publications; he supplied eight designs for a Raccolta di diverse invenzioni, mostly of small churches and villas aimed at an international clientele.

=== Napoleonic period ===
The occupation of Rome by the French from 1798 and the death in 1799 of Pius VI resulted in a loss of secure patronage for Valadier, who was forced briefly to leave the city. In 1800, however, he began a 17-year association with Prince Stanisław Poniatowski with the building of the Villa Poniatowski on the Via Flaminia, Rome. The villa, which was partly rebuilt in the 19th century, is an important example of Neoclassical Italian villa architecture.

Soon after the election in 1800 of Pope Pius VII, Valadier was put in charge of works on the River Tiber, including the restoration of the Milvian Bridge, a symbolic monument for the papacy as it was the scene of Constantine’s great victory over Maxentius. The decayed bastion was turned into a monumental gateway with severe rustication, reminiscent of Claude Nicolas Ledoux’s Barrières (1784–9) in Paris. Similar rustication completely covers the narrow but monumental façade of San Pantaleo, Rome, which Valadier executed for the Torlonia family from 1806. The two-storey façade is articulated to suggest a pair of massive pilasters supporting an arch that embraces a thermal window. The two storeys are divided by a deep sculpted frieze, the whole façade being surmounted by a shallow pediment.

Following the annexation of the papal states by the French in 1809, Valadier was appointed Direttore dei Lavori Pubblici di Beneficenza, in which capacity he investigated the navigability of the Tiber and produced proposals for the restoration of the antiquities of Rome.

=== Piazza del Popolo ===
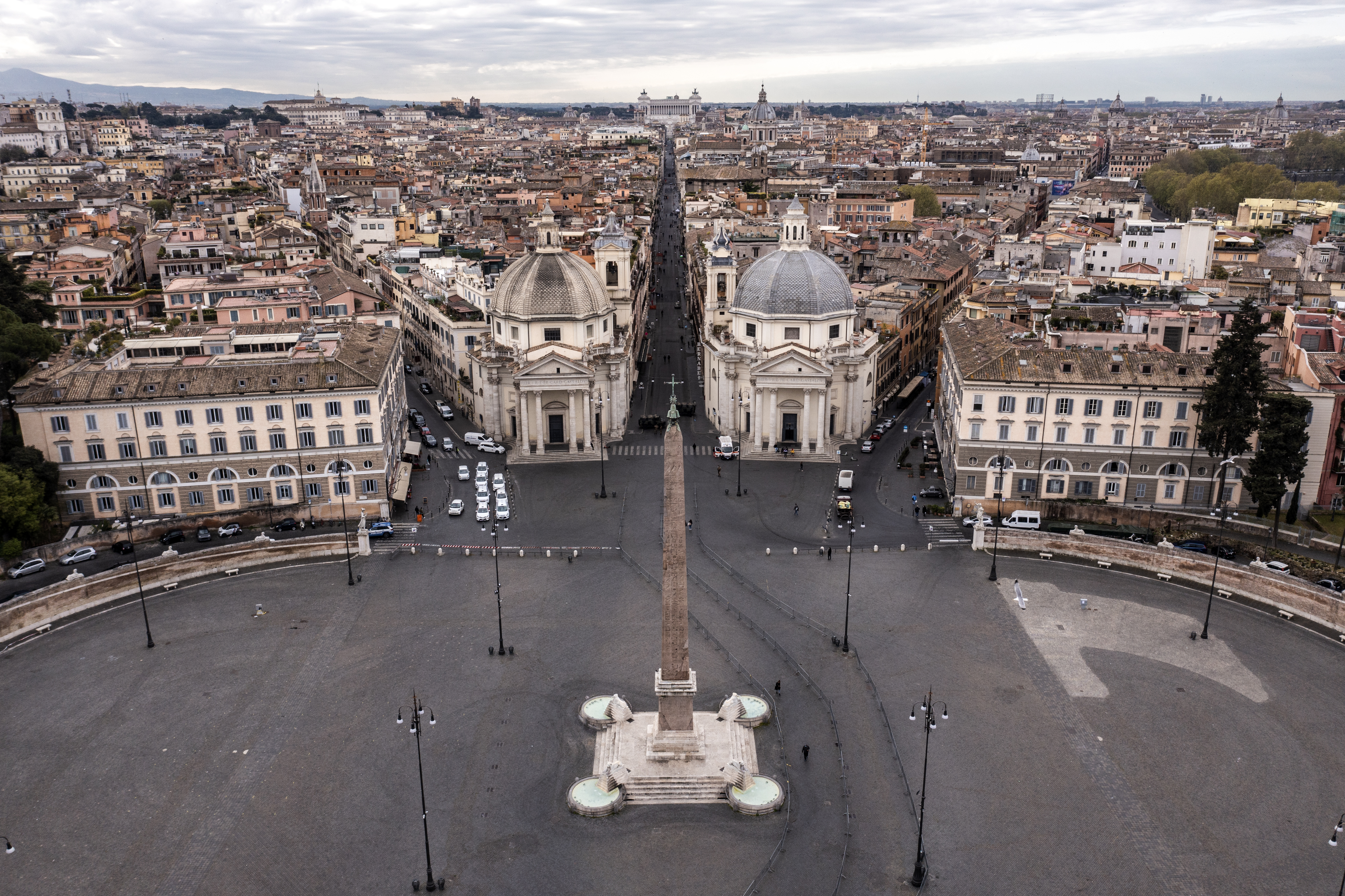
Piazza del Popolo, Rome

Of greater significance, however, was the project to ennoble the Piazza del Popolo, Valadier’s triumphant experiment in urban design. As early as 1793 Valadier had considered the problem of unifying the various elements of this incoherent ensemble: the 15th-century church of Santa Maria del Popolo, the 16th-century Porta del Popolo and the twin churches by Carlo Rainaldi, Gian Lorenzo Bernini and Carlo Fontana that had been commissioned by Pope Alexander VII and built in the 1660s. Valadier originally proposed a treatment not unlike Michelangelo’s Piazza del Campidoglio (1539–64; completed in the 17th century by others), with two long columnar façades converging towards the Porta del Popolo to produce a trapezoidal piazza. The schemes he drew up from 1812, however, were much more ambitious, involving the demolition of a large area to the west of the piazza and the laying out of extensive gardens. The trapezoidal form was initially retained, although flanked by semicircular areas. In later projects, the semicircles were further emphasised until the piazza itself took on the oval form that was finally adopted. To the east, a series of ramps lead up the Pincian Hill to a formal garden of some complexity. Many different schemes exist for the siting of a monumental building on this hill, but all that was finally built was a coffee house, the Casina Valadier. In the piazza itself, the four corners were anchored by two speculative residential blocks to the south, a barracks to the north-west and a monastery adjoining Santa Maria del Popolo. The asymmetrically placed 16th-century fountain was replaced by four stone lions spouting water at the four corners of the existing obelisk.

=== Later works ===
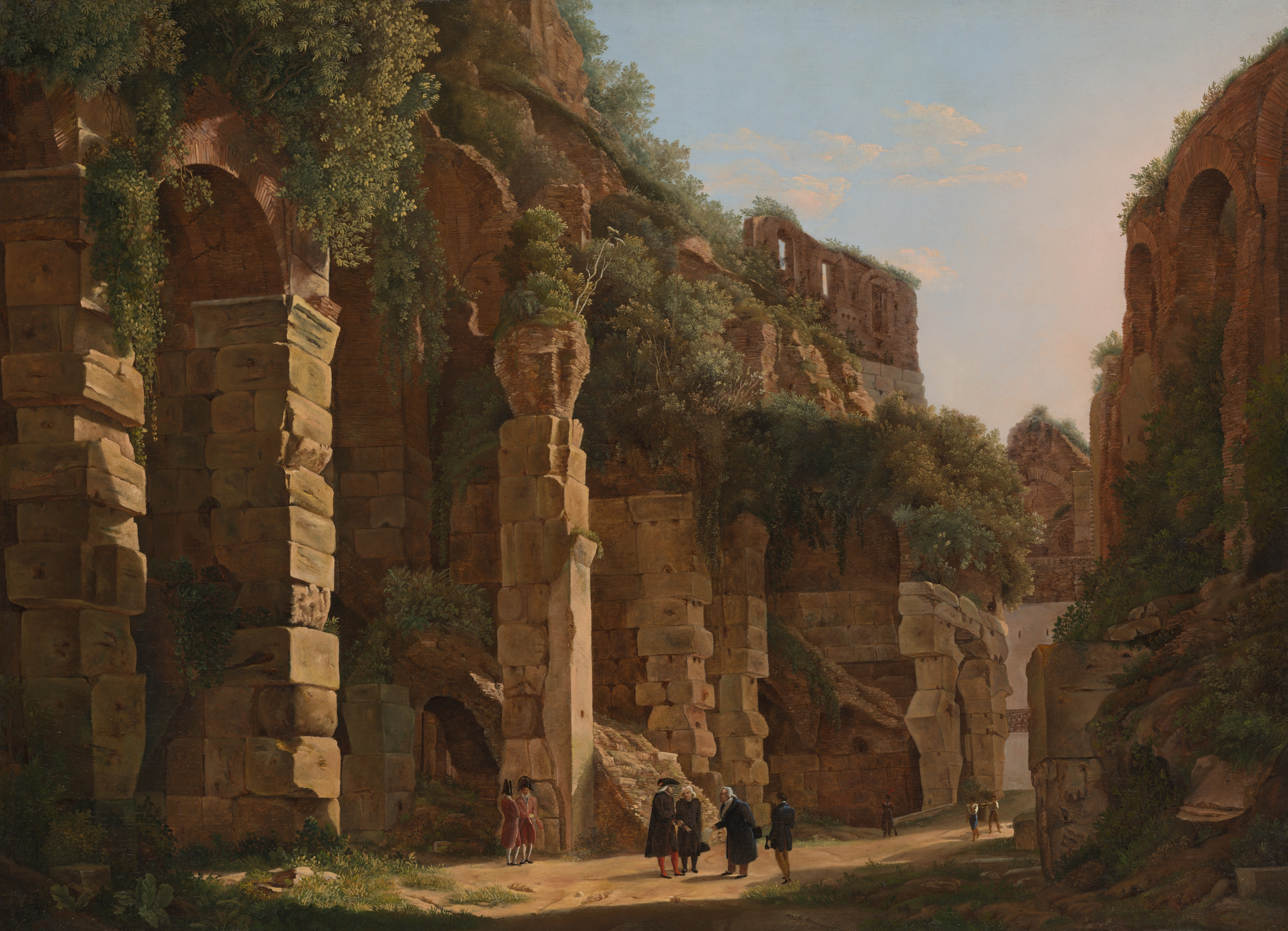
Inside the Colosseum (c. 1823), by Franz Ludwig Catel (Art Institute of Chicago). In the center foreground, Valadier (second from right) presents plans for the restoration of the Colosseum to Cardinal Ercole Consalvi (left).

The work was approved by Pope Pius VII in 1816 and completed in 1824. Pius VII also engaged Valadier for the construction of a church (1814–25) in his home town of Cesena, dedicated to Saint Christina. Externally unpretentious, the circular church has a brick façade with an unpedimented Tuscan Doric portico. The interior features a coffered dome supported by coupled Ionic columns. Valadier subsequently worked on the tomb of Pius VII in St Peter’s, Rome.

Valadier then became embroiled in the controversy that raged over the rebuilding of the church of the Basilica of Saint Paul Outside the Walls, destroyed by fire in 1823. He proposed rebuilding the church along the axis of the old transept, thus considerably reducing its size. This was opposed by Angelo Uggeri and the church architects, one of whom, Pasquale Belli, finally received the commission.

In the last two decades of his life, Valadier became increasingly involved in restoration work, most notably of the Arch of Titus (1819–21), remarkable for the care taken to distinguish the new work from the original by using travertine rather than marble, and the Temple of Portunus (1829–35).

Valadier was professor of architectural theory (1821–37) at the Accademia di San Luca, later publishing his lectures. He also occasionally provided designs for silver, such as the "York Chalice" for the Cardinal Duke of York (1800–01), the grand silver table service for Monsignor Antonio Odescalchi (1795–97) and the similar Rospigliosi-Pallavicini service, begun in 1803 which he partly produced in the silver workshop he directly oversaw and partly sub-contracted to other Roman silversmiths. Valadier also designed some furniture and other decorative arts, such as the rock crystal and silver reliquary for relics of the Holy Crib in Santa Maria Maggiore, for Pope Pius IX.

== Major works ==
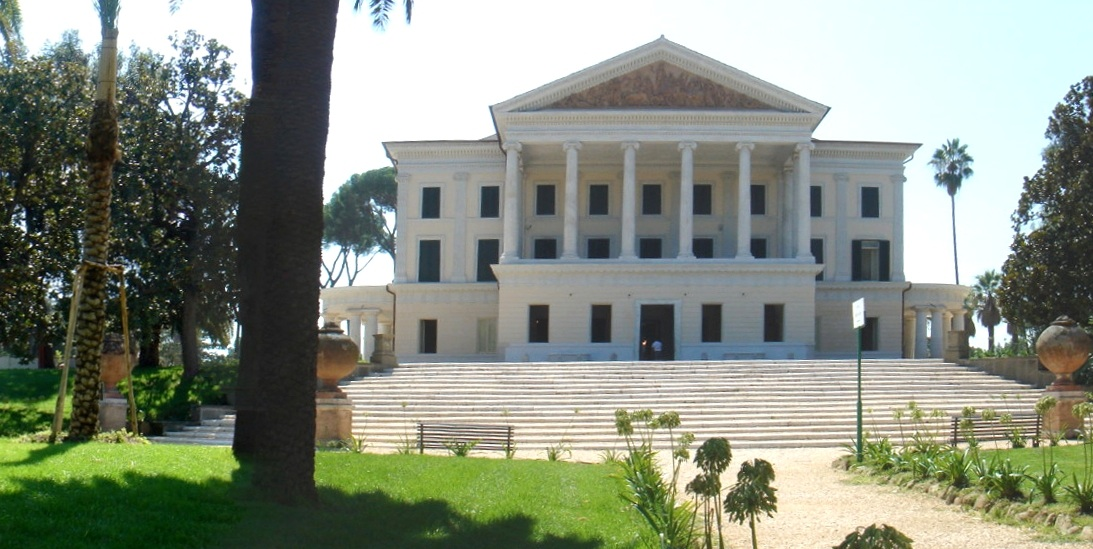
Villa Torlonia, Rome

- Villa Pianciani, Spoleto;
- Clocks with mosaic faces on top of the façade belltowers, Basilica of Saint Peter (1786–90);
- Villa Torlonia, Rome (1806 onwards);
- General plan for access to the Imperial Forums (1811);
- General plans for Piazza del Popolo (first plans, 1793; final plans executed 1816–20), creating its elliptical plan and linking it via stairs and terraces with the Pincio, including the Casina Valadier (1816 onwards) in the Borghese Gardens;
- Teatro Valle (1819);
- Fiumicino (1822); the first planned suburb of modern Rome (1823–28);
  - Church of Santa Maria della Salute, Fiumicino
- Restoration of the Arch of Titus, including the outer portion of the arch, and exterior columns)(1821-1822)
- opening of Via di Ripetta, Rome, via del Babuino, and via della Caserma (1822);
  - Church of San Rocco, façade, in Ripetta (1831)
  - Palazzo Nainer, via del Babuino (1819–21), now a hotel.
  - 79, via del Babuino (1826); the architect's own home.
- General plan for the piazza of St John Lateran;
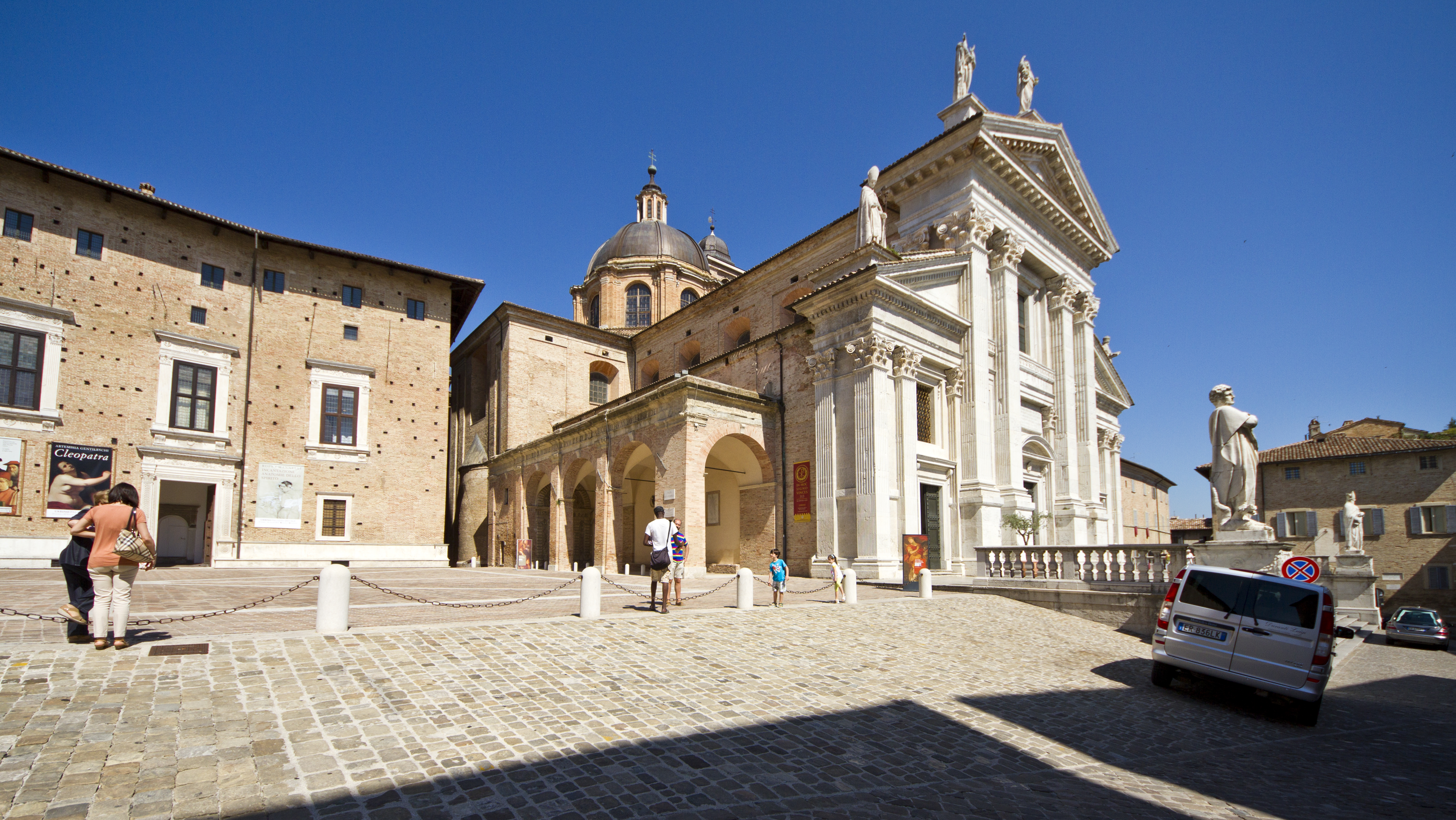
Façade of Urbino Cathedral

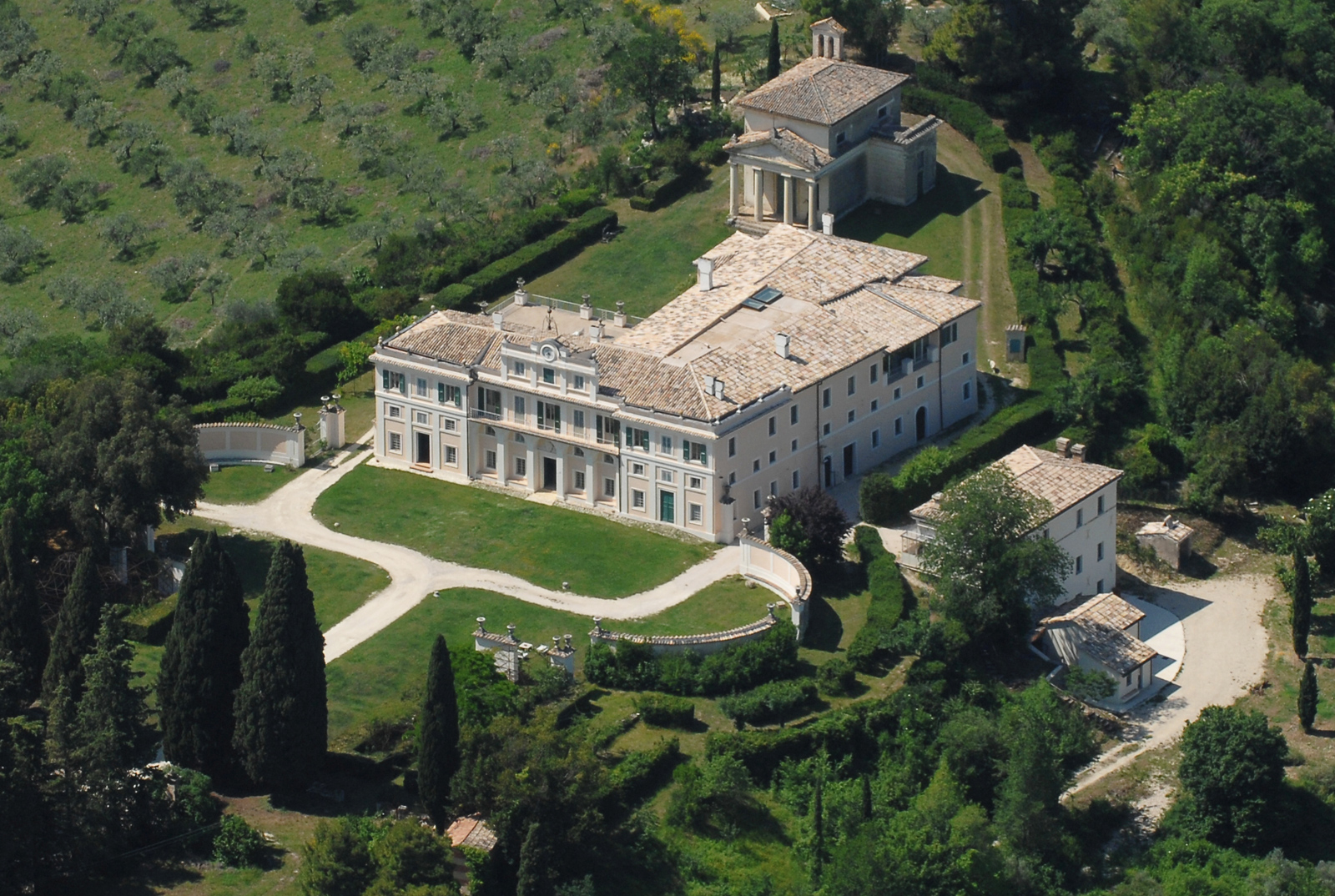
Villa Pianciani, Spoleto

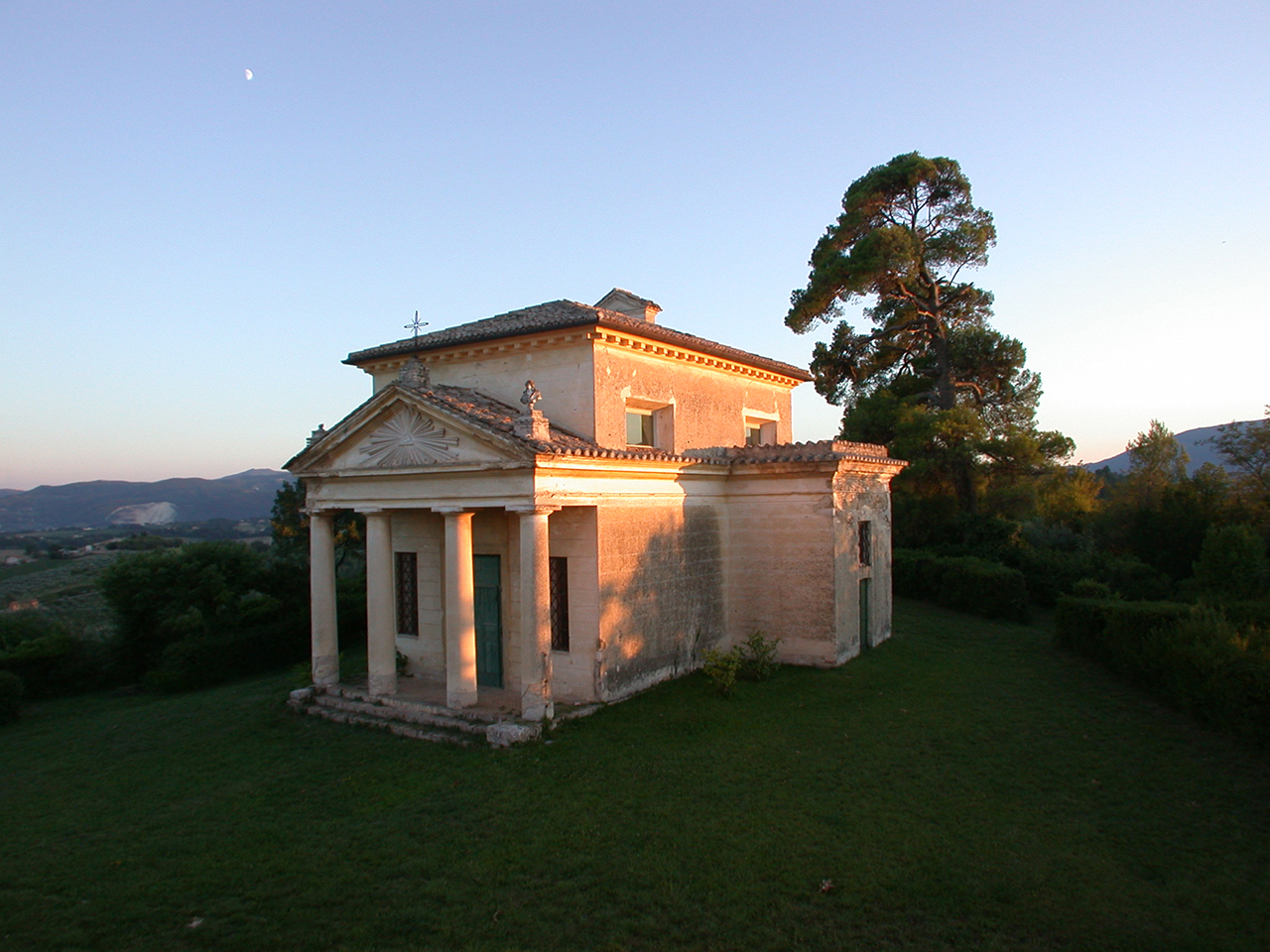
Chapel of the Villa

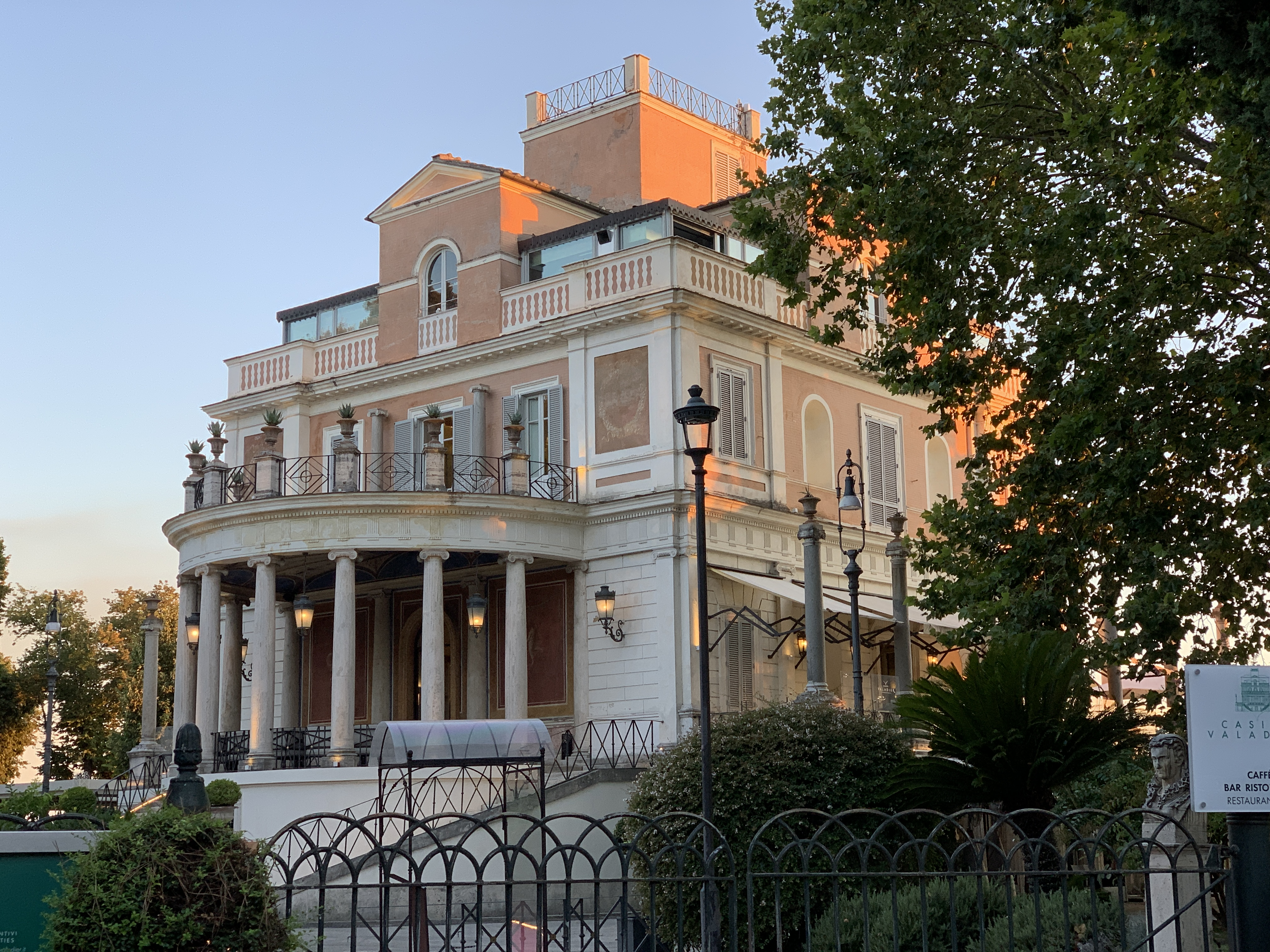
Casina Valadier, Rome

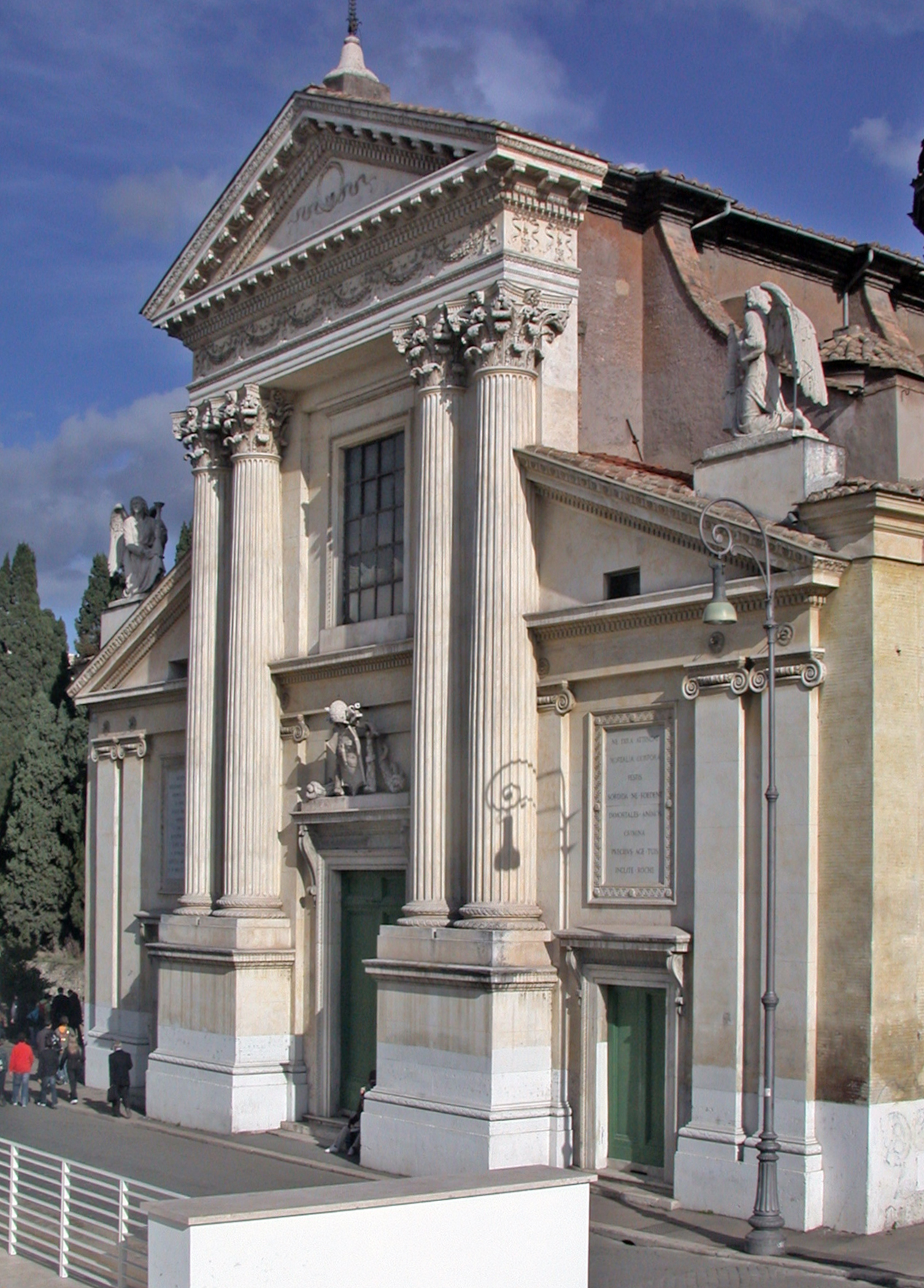
Façade of San Rocco all'Augusteo, Rome

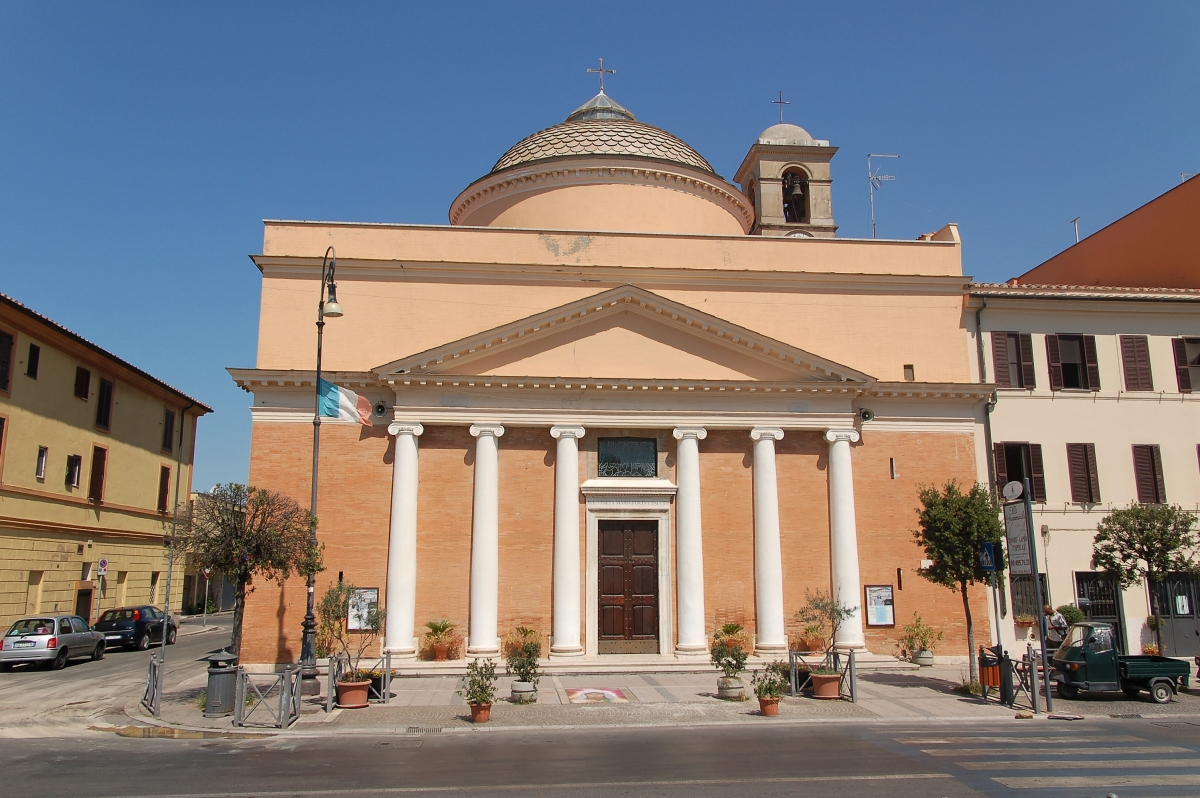
Santa Maria della Salute, Fiumicino

Valadier published collections of his designs and drawings:

- Giuseppe Valadier, Progetti architettonici (Architectonic projects), Rome 1807;
- Giuseppe Valadier, Raccolta delle più insigni fabbriche di Roma antica, Rome 1810;
- Giuseppe Valadier, L'Architettura pratica: dettata nella Scuola dell'insigne Accademia di San Luca, 5 vols, Rome 1828– 1834.
