= Uggeri =

Uggeri is a surname. Notable people with the surname include:

- Angelo Uggeri (1754–1837), Italian abbot
- Barthelemy Uggeri (died 1479), Roman Catholic prelate
- Mario Uggeri (1924–2004), Italian comic artist
