= Villa Archinto Pennati, Monza =

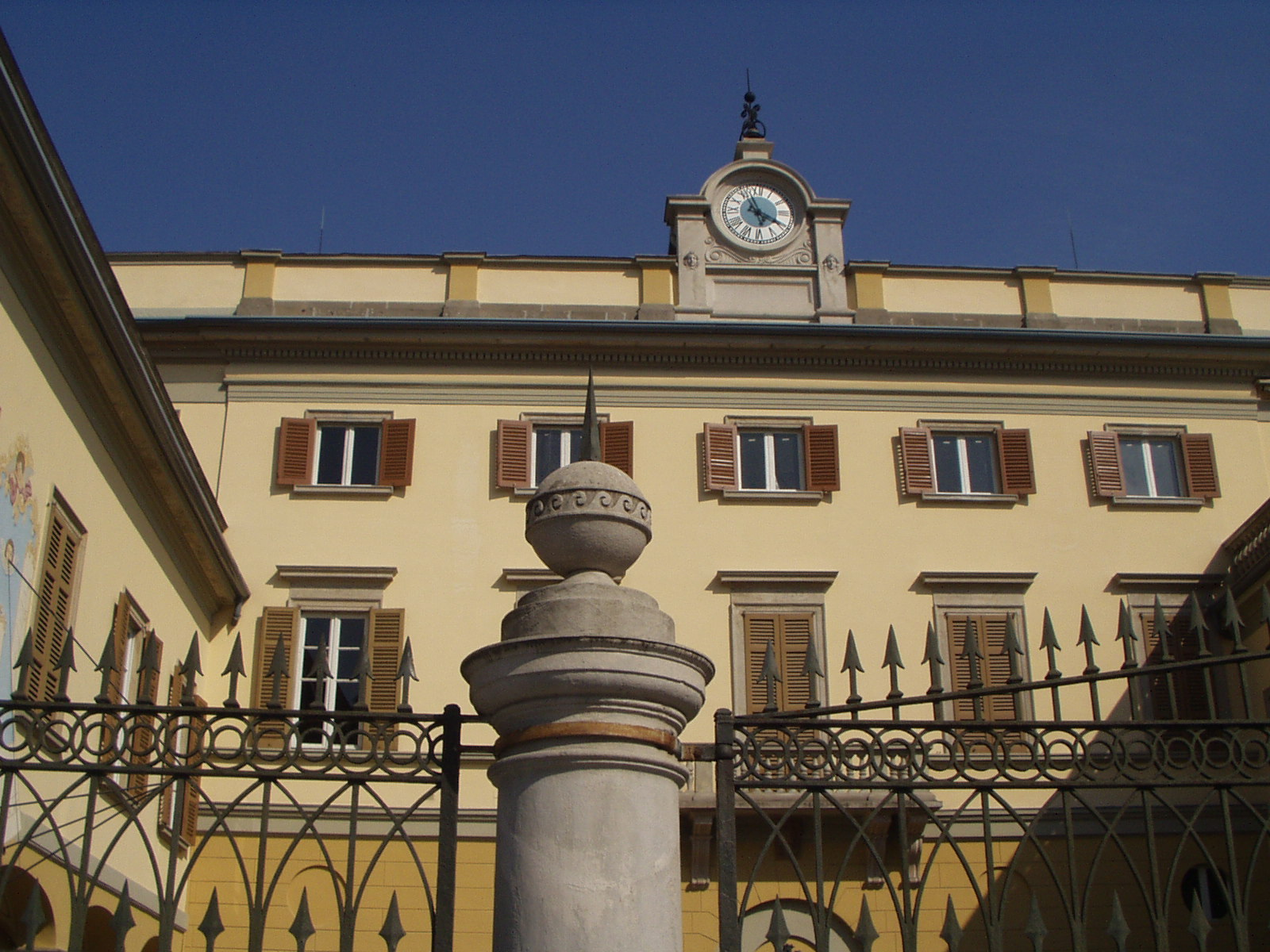
- Interactive map of the Villa Archinto Pennati, Monza area

General information
- Type: palace
- Architectural style: Neoclassical
- Location: Region of Lombardy
- Coordinates: 45.5896°N 9.2782°E

The Villa Archinti Pennati is a Neoclassical style rural palace outside of the town of Monza, in the Region of Lombardy, Italy.

== History ==
The villa's design is indebted to Luigi Canonica and was built for Count Archinto, beginning in 1829. A 16th-century palace once stood at the site. Canonica also designed the surrounding landscaped gardens, adjacent to those of the Royal Villa of Monza and bordering the Lambro river. In 1862, the Archinto family sold the property to the Barnabite Order, who converted the property in to a school for boys. In 1873, the institute was suppressed and the villa acquired by Filippo Pennati. It remains a private residence of his descendants, and is now subdivided into apartments. Much of the movable interior decoration was sold by the Barnabite Order.

The gardens contain two small temples, a pseudo-medieval tower, and an artificial lake, as well as other decorative architectural objects.

== Other sources ==
- La Villa Archinto a Monza. Analogie con alcuni esempi d'architettura neoclassica in Lombardia. by Silvia Guagliumi. Thesis from 1982-1983, published by Silvia editrice. Milan (2014). Relatore : Prof.Arch.Carlo Perogalli
