= Villa Pianciani =

Complex of the late 18th century

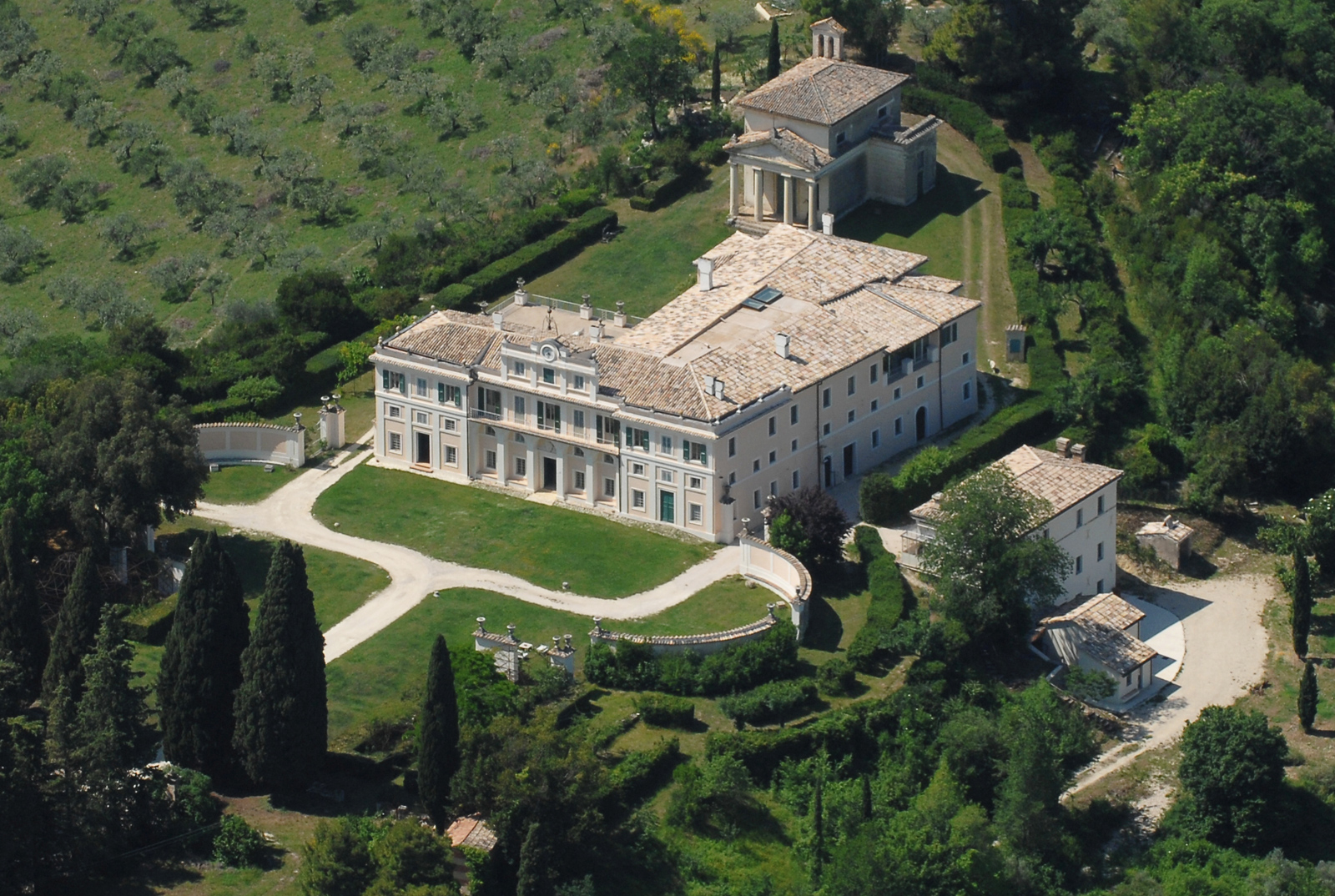
- Villa, annex and chapel
- Interactive map of the Villa Pianciani area
- Former names: La Delizia Dei Pianciani

General information
- Type: villa
- Architectural style: Baroque/Neoclassic
- Location: Spoleto, Italy
- Coordinates: 42.785694°N 12.693209°E
- Renovated: 2010
- Owner: private

Design and construction
- Architect: Giuseppe Valadier

Villa Pianciani is a complex situated a hill that overlooking the Spoleto Valley in Umbria, Italy. The complex is the work of architect Giuseppe Valadier and comprises five buildings and a historical park.

== History ==
The illa complex was built by the Pianciani family, an ancient and noble family that played a significant role in Spoleto’s history. The family transformed a pre-existing building into the ‘Delizia dei Pianciani’ (The Piancianis’ Delight). The work was designed by the young architect Giuseppe Valadier. It was initiated at the request of Count Alessandro Pianciani to celebrate his marriage with Costanza Collicola, a member of a noble family of Spoleto.

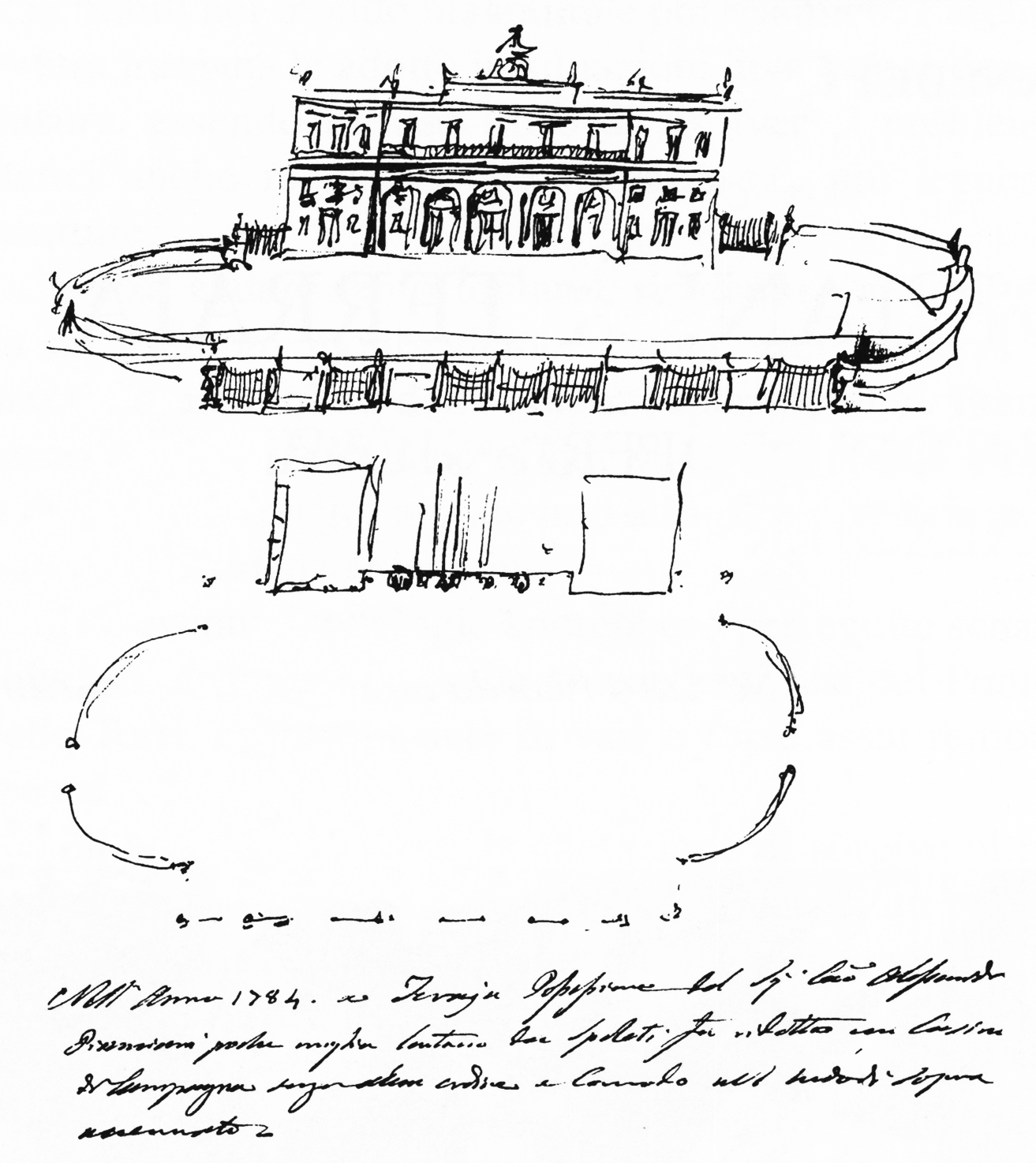
Original Sketch of the Villa by G. Valadier

The villa, an addition to the family's other properties in Pianciano and Lake Trasimeno, became a summer estate for the family. Vincenzo Pianciani moved to Rome to become the Director of Finance of the Papal States, where he founded The Savings Bank of Rome.

His marriage with Amalia Ruspoli allowed him to enter the Roman aristocracy. Among his children, Giambattista Pianciani was a physicist, a professor in the Roman College (where he wrote his famous essay ‘Dogmatica’) and then a professor at Georgetown University in Washington, D.C. When he returned to Rome, he became the General Prefect of Studies.

Luigi Pianciani was a patriot who was exiled to England until 1860, then returned to Italy to become the first elected Mayor of Rome, Deputy, and Senator of the Kingdom of Italy. The importance of the Pianciani family reached its peak during the time of Luigi Pianciani. The family's financial fortunes weakened over the following generations.

Vincenzo had seven children, but Carlo only had one child, a girl named Matilde Pianciani. The current owners of the Villa are the descendants of Matilde.

== Architecture ==
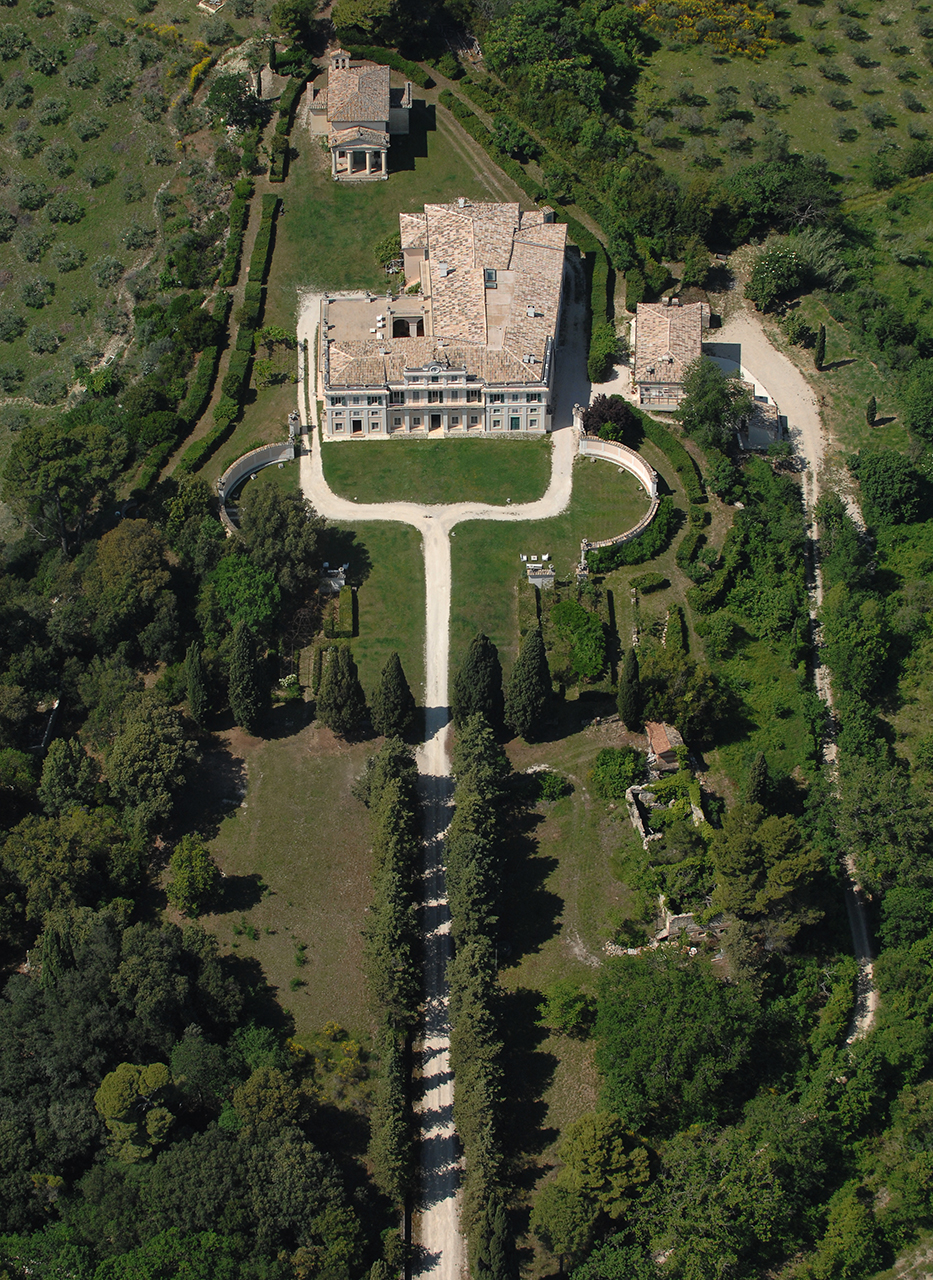
Villa Pianciani Complex

The complex was designed by Giuseppe Valadier, a designer, urban planner, and restorer. He is mainly recognised for the layout of Piazza del Popolo in Rome (from 1793 to 1815) with its emphasis on a harmonic and functional layout of buildings and external spaces. He built Villa Pianciani on an existing medieval structure creating a spectacular residence. It is one of the very few villas designed by a distinguished architect.

Within the historical Park are:

- the ‘Villa’ originally called ‘Casino Principale’ (main house)
- the ‘Cappella’ (chapel)
- the Old Kitchens, a three-story house connected to the main Villa
- the ‘Rudere’ (an actual ruin)
- the ‘Casale Dei Rombi’, a large two-story building once used as stables and for storage

In the past, there were two buildings symmetrical to the access axis. The park, also designed by Valadier, is distinguished by various architectural elements. The Secret Garden, a large elliptic esplanade in front of the facade, is encircled by a two-wall portico that opens to two opposite, open-sided galleries with panoramic views and two vast symmetrical Gazebos (pavilions) in wrought iron decorated with roses. The geometric and symmetric character of the layout adheres to traditional Italian gardens, combining decorative elements, comfort, and nature. All architectural elements of style, character, and complementary functions, give the structure unity and artistic value.

== The Buildings ==
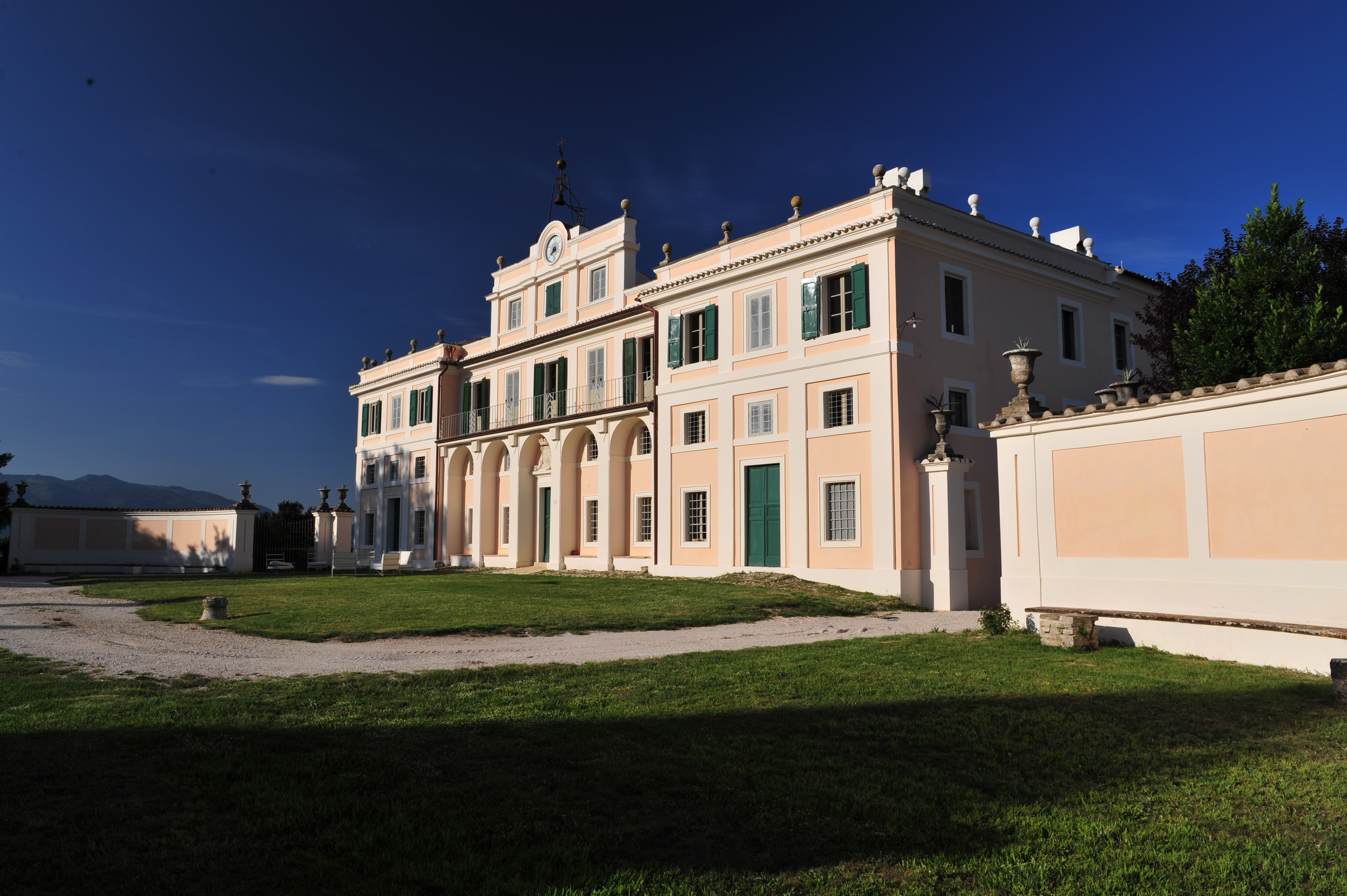
Villa Pianciani

=== The Main House ===
Also known as ‘La Delizia dei Pianciani’ (The Piancianis’ Delight), the spacious central construction of the Villa is characterised by the panoramic scene. It was conceived by Valadier as an elongated facade of 11 openings spatially extended within the exedra of the square. The main house is typical of the Roman baroque style of French contemporary buildings at the time the Villa was built.

The construction expands towards the top of the hill and towards the rear of the chapel in the direction of the sunset. Pietro Ferrari (1762–1825), an architect from Spoleto, took over the completion of the works and finished the east wing of the house. Inside the building, there are three levels: the ground floor, the mezzanine, and the noble level. The ground floor has huge halls and a wide patio. The mezzanine level holds a small library and service rooms and runs through the northwest side of the Villa. The noble level has rooms with balconies on both sides and a vast terrace overlooking Spoleto and the valley below.

Villa Pianciani has preserved the decoration and furniture of the century: ceiling panels, paintings on the walls with eloquently painted landscape scenes, door frames and framed displays, faux marble, and chiaroscuro with small floral elements or with small figures. The decorative elements are mainly handworks by unknown craftsmen, dating back to the years following the construction until the first decade of the 19th century. The techniques used were water paintings for plaster and for canvas, tempera paintings, and decorative carvings on paper using the technical skills of the local workers of the era.

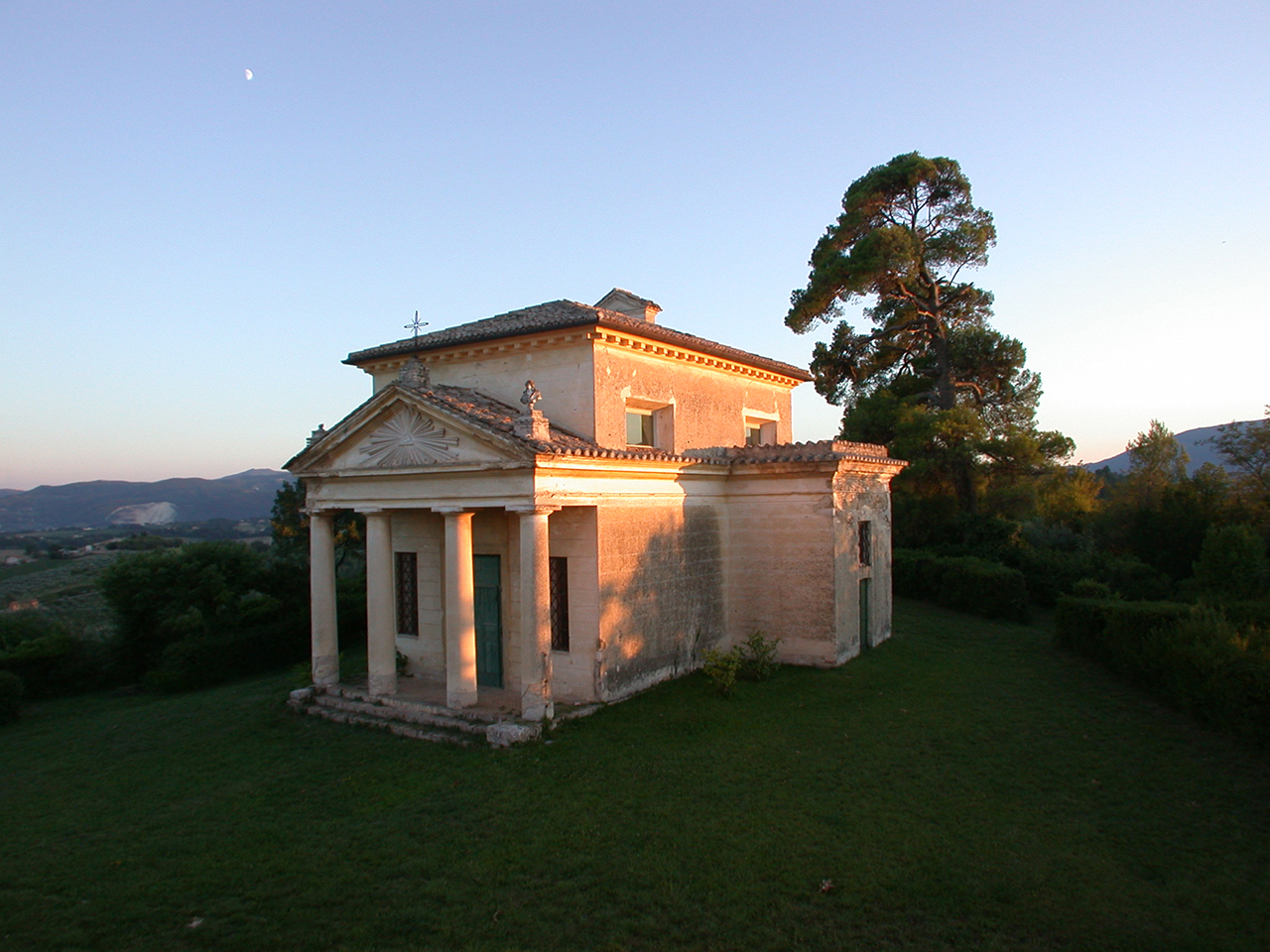
Chapel

=== The Chapel ===
The chapel is also the work of Valadier and is situated behind the main house, on the highest point of the hill. The triangular tympanum, the four columned doric porch, the symmetric structure of the barrel-vaulted isle, and the two lateral sacristies show strong ties to Palladian architecture. However, the inside, decorated with precious decorations of the decade, is unrestored.

=== The Secret Garden ===
When entering the property, there is a small forest on the left where the Neoclassical style of the Secret Garden is visible. Designed by Valadier as an entity that unites with the rest of the Villa, the Secret Garden is composed of an elliptic wall, cobbled stairs, a shrine arch and the remains of a fountain and a sundial. Roman statues and iron banisters were characteristic in this period and used to adorn the garden. The influences of the Enlightenment are also evident, with a passageway and fake ruins to create a space in which to wander and dream.

=== The Annex ===
The Annex is traditionally called the ‘Casino delle Vecchie Cucine’ (a lodge of the Old Kitchens). It is an independent building close to the Villa with three levels that originally housed the kitchen and the majority of the services. This building, more linear than the Main House, is on the northwest side of the hill and offers a magnificent view of the valley in the direction of Montefalco and Assisi. The third floor is on the same level as the main entrance of the Villa and overlooks the park. The second floor is internally connected to the ground floor of the Villa via an underground tunnel excavated into the hillside. The two bottom floors of the Annex follow the natural height difference of the hill and stop at the independent and spacious garden of the ‘Piazzale del Tramonto’ which can also be reached by a separate driveway (‘Viale dei Gelsi’).

=== Building in the park ===
An additional building, recognizable today only as a ruin, represents the unique survivor of two symmetric artifacts originally set at the sides of the main avenue of entry and named barracks’. These buildings, located at the sides of the path to the main house and inclined parallel to the axis, guided the gaze of the visitor along the entrance to focus the attention on the facade of the main building.

=== The Park ===
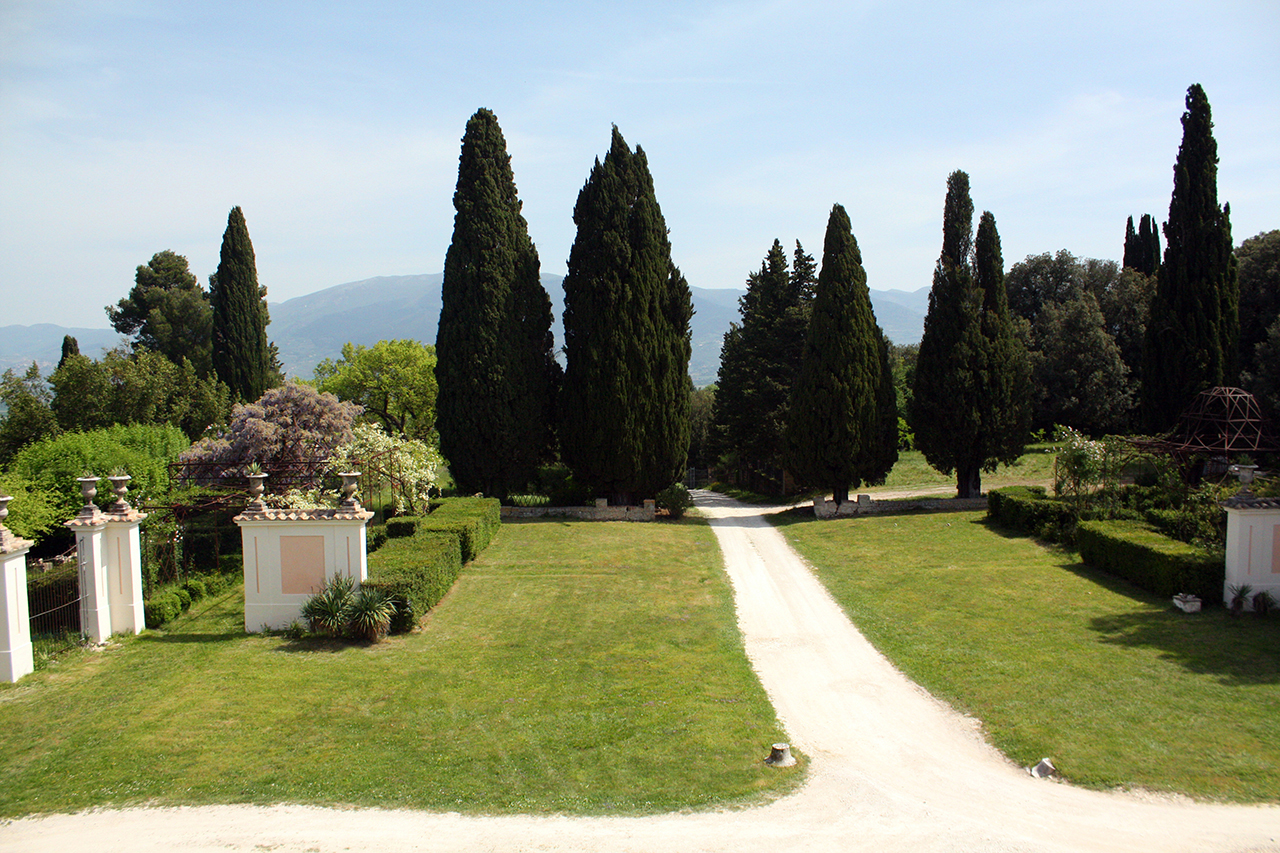
Park

Giuseppe Valadier also designed a large park around the Villa. Across from the entrance surrounded by oaks, is a 2000 m2 park where cypress trees lead to the peak of the hill with two lateral paths that guide the way along the property. The central axis continues through a geometric square that contains two large pavilions made of wrought iron and decorated with roses ending in an elliptical square limited by exedras. The layout is in the geometric and symmetric lines of traditional Italian gardens, while the park as a whole follows the contour of the land in the style of English naturalism with hundreds of box hedges that create shaded winding walkways called ‘Cocchi’, bounded by pergolas and flowers.

== The restoration ==
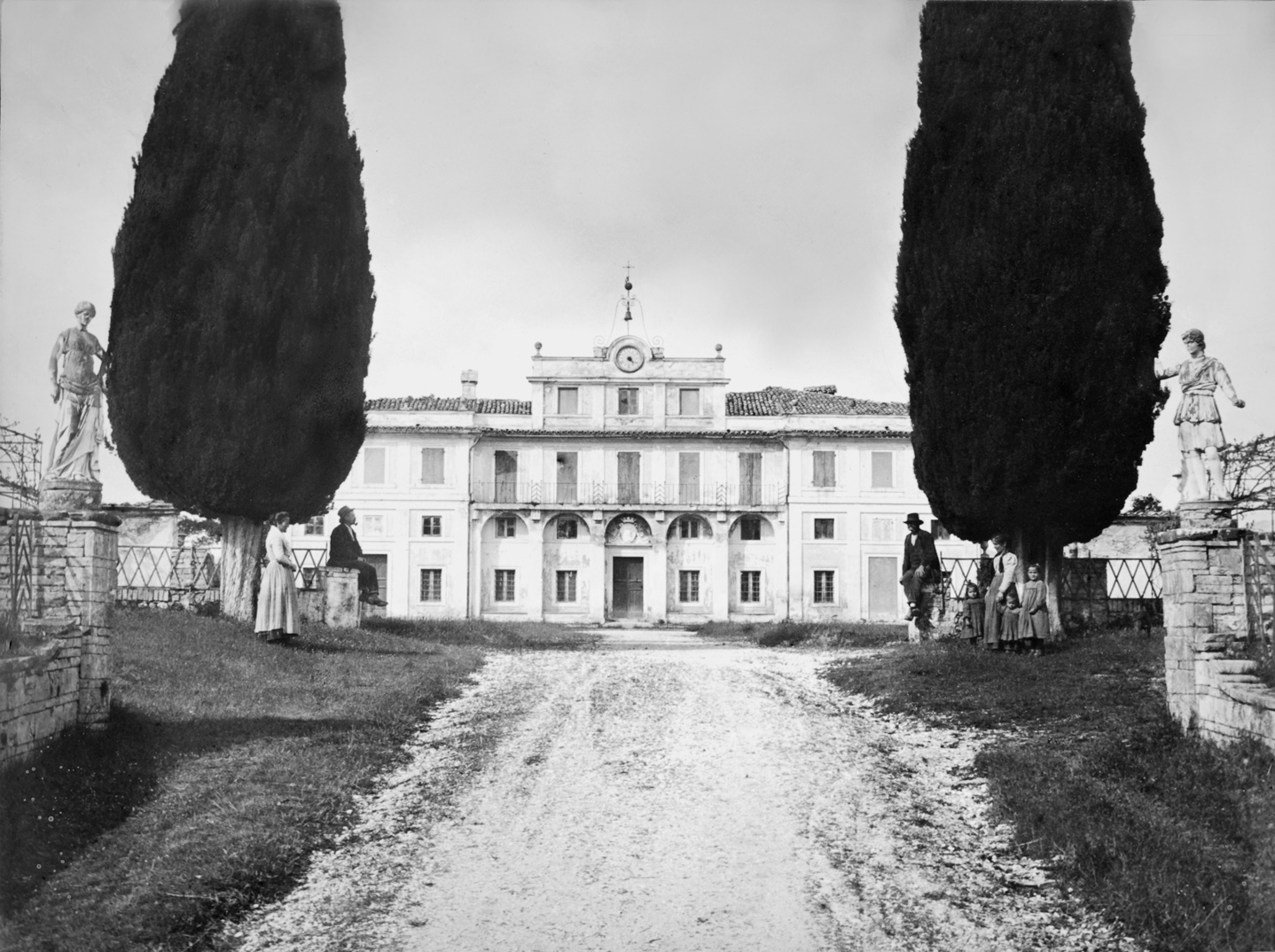
Villa Pianciani

Over the centuries, the furnishings and Roman statues that decorated the Villa and the Park deteriorated. After the 1990s, the line of the family that inherited one part of the Villa Complex − the descendants of Matilde Pianciani − were able to buy back the other half. In the first decade of the 21st century, working with the Soprintendenza alle Belle Arti of Umbria, a part of the Ministry of Cultural Heritage and Activities, and with the support of the Italian government, important work, restoration, and architectural improvement were carried out to recover the original designs. Contemporary art is also featured in the final decoration of the complex.

=== Historical site ===
The site is a National Monument, a member of the Dimore Storiche Italiane (Italian Historic Houses) and a landmark for the territory.

== The Association ==
The Matilde Pianciani Cultural Association (a non-profit organization) was created to protect, promote, and develop the Monumental Complex of Villa Pianciani, including the obligation to manage and endorse annual programs. Villa Pianciani in Terraja also aims to raise awareness of the rich artistic and cultural heritage of Umbria. The Association organizes art and language courses, hosts events, and welcomes volunteers and tourists from around the world.

== See also ==
- Umbria
- Spoleto
- Luigi Pianciani
- Giuseppe Valadier
- Mayor of Rome
- Italian traditional gardens
- Italian neoclassicism
