= Palazzo Brentani =

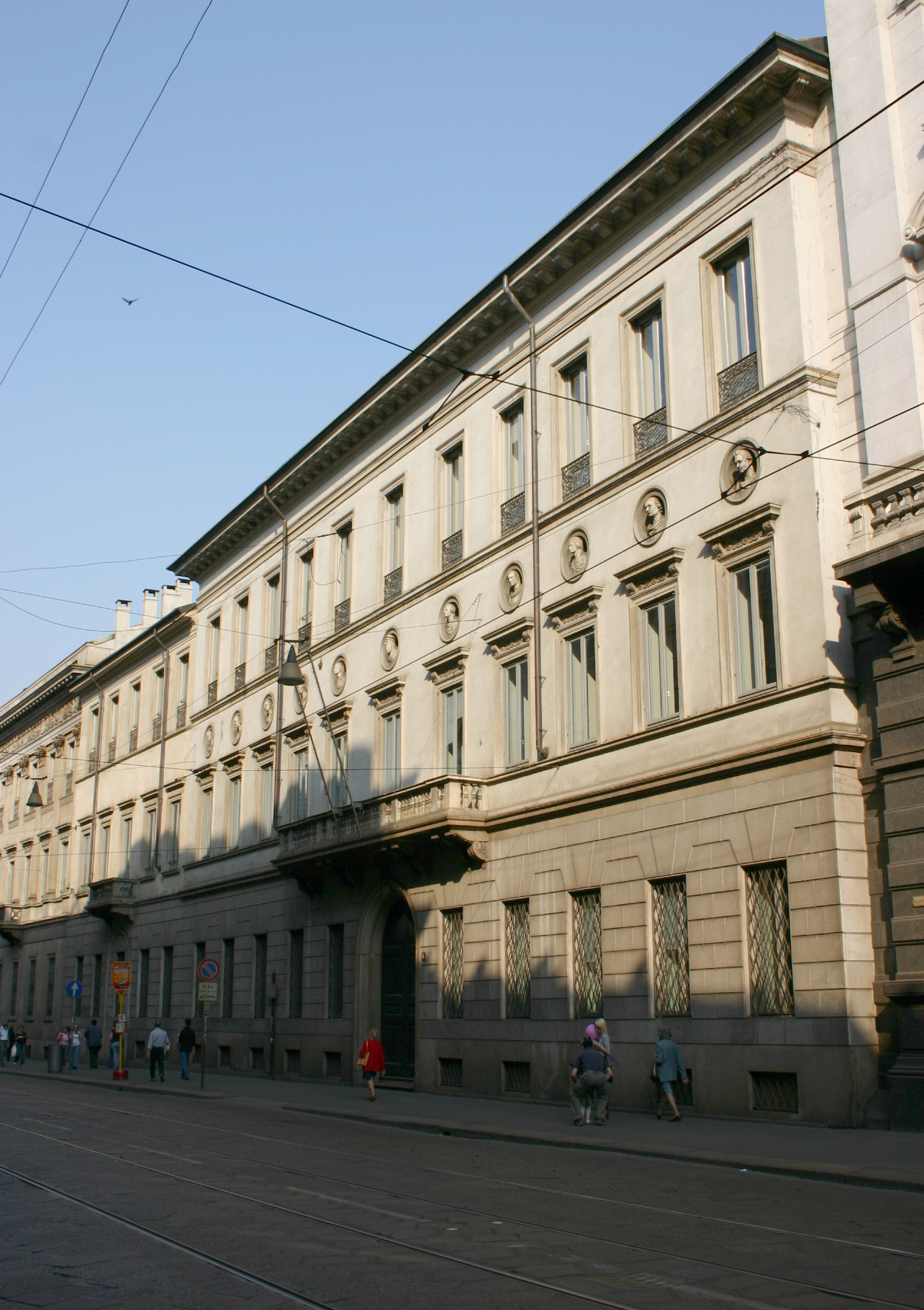
- Palazzo Brentani in Milan
- Click on the map for a fullscreen view

General information
- Architectural style: Neoclassical
- Location: Milan, Italy
- Coordinates: 45°28′04.21″N 9°11′26.51″E

The Palazzo Brentani is a monumental Neoclassical palace, located on Via Manzoni #6, in the centre of Milan, region of Lombardy, Italy. Both this palace and the adjacent Palazzo Anguissola Antona Traversi have sober academic facades, designed by Luigi Canonica in 1829.

== History ==
The building's rather straightforward appearance is the result of Canonica's restructuring in 1829 when he added a facade divided into three bands by cornices. Between the first and second floors, the building is decorated with medallions of distinguished Italian figures including Alessandro Volta, Leonardo da Vinci, Canova, Pietro Verri, Cesare Beccaria, and Giuseppe Parini. The door is surmounted by a balcony for viewing street processions.

On 4 August 1848, the residence was the scene of the attempted assassination of Charles Albert, king of Sardinia. Standing on the balcony while trying to appease a crowd protesting an imminent armistice with the Austrian army, he was just missed by a rifle shot.

Today, following renovation by Giuseppe De Finetti in 1935, the palace and the adjacent Palazzo Anguissola is home to the Gallerie di Piazza Scala.

== Gallery ==
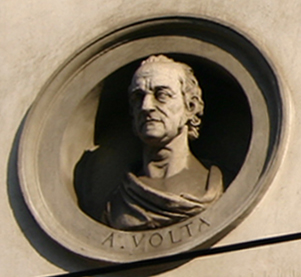
Alessandro Volta

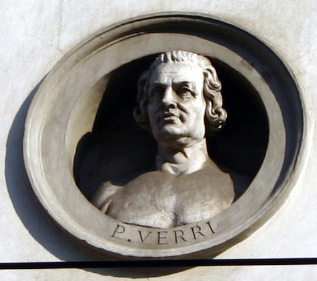
Pietro Verri

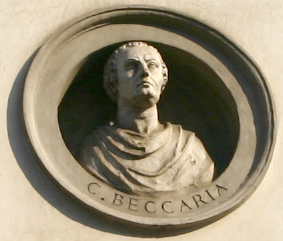
Cesare Beccaria

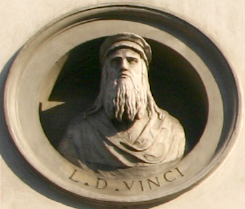
Leonardo da Vinci

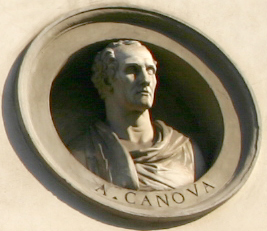
Antonio Canova

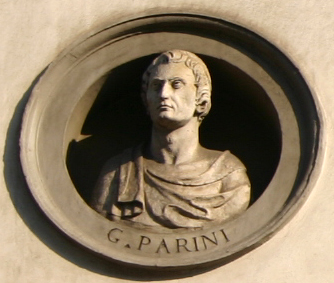
Giuseppe Parini

== See also ==
- Neoclassical architecture in Milan
