= Palazzo Anguissola Antona Traversi =

Palace in Milan, Italy

Coordinates: 45.468302°N 9.190898°E

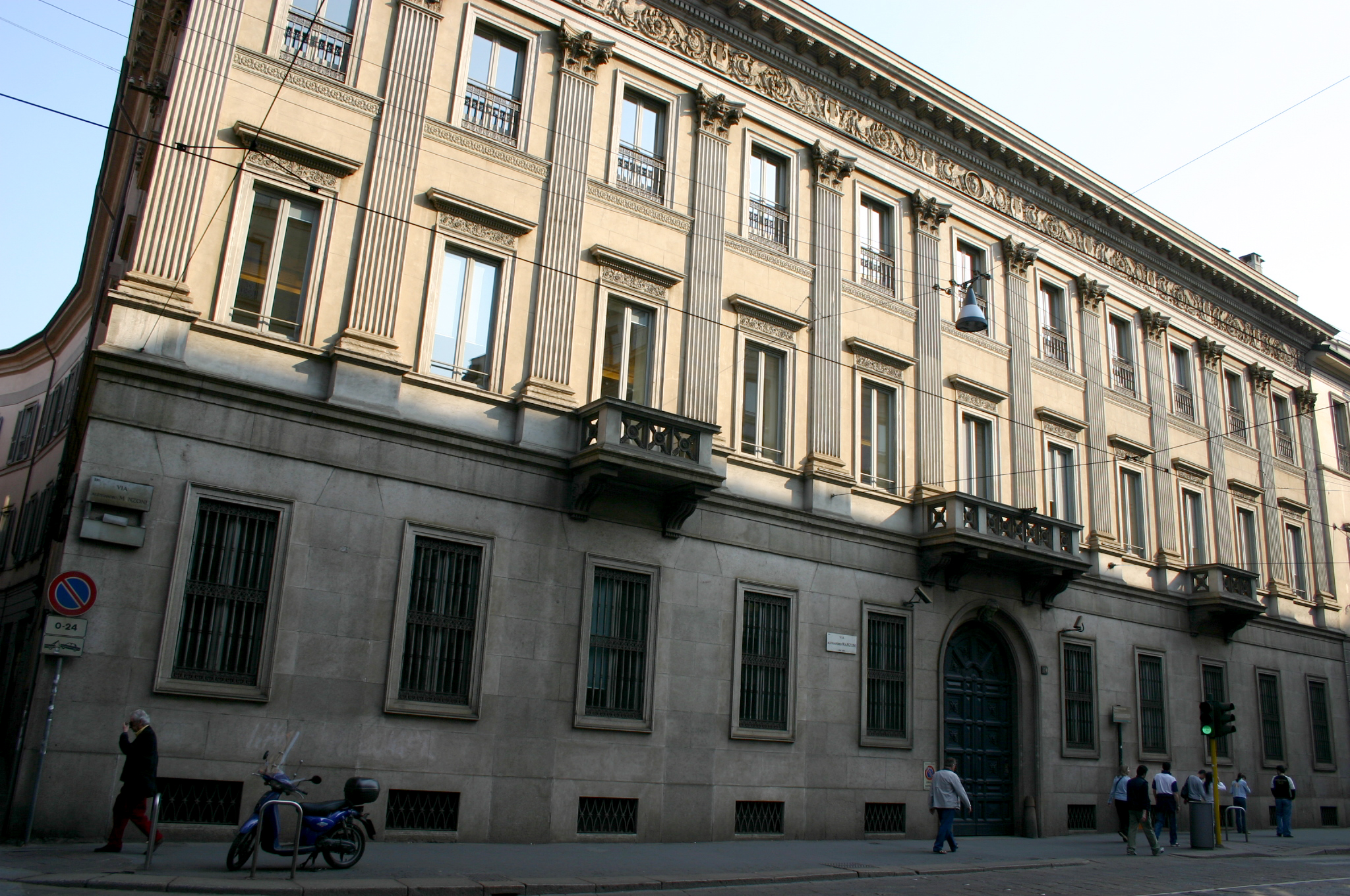
Palazzo Anguissola, Milan

The Palazzo Anguissola Antona Traversi is a palace located at Via Manzoni number 10, in central Milan, a city in the northern Italy. Construction began in 1778, and its Neoclassical facade, designed by Luigi Canonica, was added in 1829.

The inner core of the building was constructed between 1775 and 1778 under the supervision of Carlo Felice Soave from Lugano with particular attention to the interior garden. The building soon changed hands and in 1829 the exterior was reworked by Luigi Canonica who gave it the finish it maintains today. More ornate than most Milanese Neoclassical buildings, the facade consists of Corinthian pilasters terminating in a frieze with a musical relief clearly inspired by the nearby Scala. The ground floor is however faced with smooth blocks of granite rather than with the more common bugnato finish.

Today, together with adjoining Palazzo Brentani the building houses the Gallerie d'Italia - Milano.

== See also ==
- Neoclassical architecture in Milan
