= Teatro Amilcare Ponchielli =

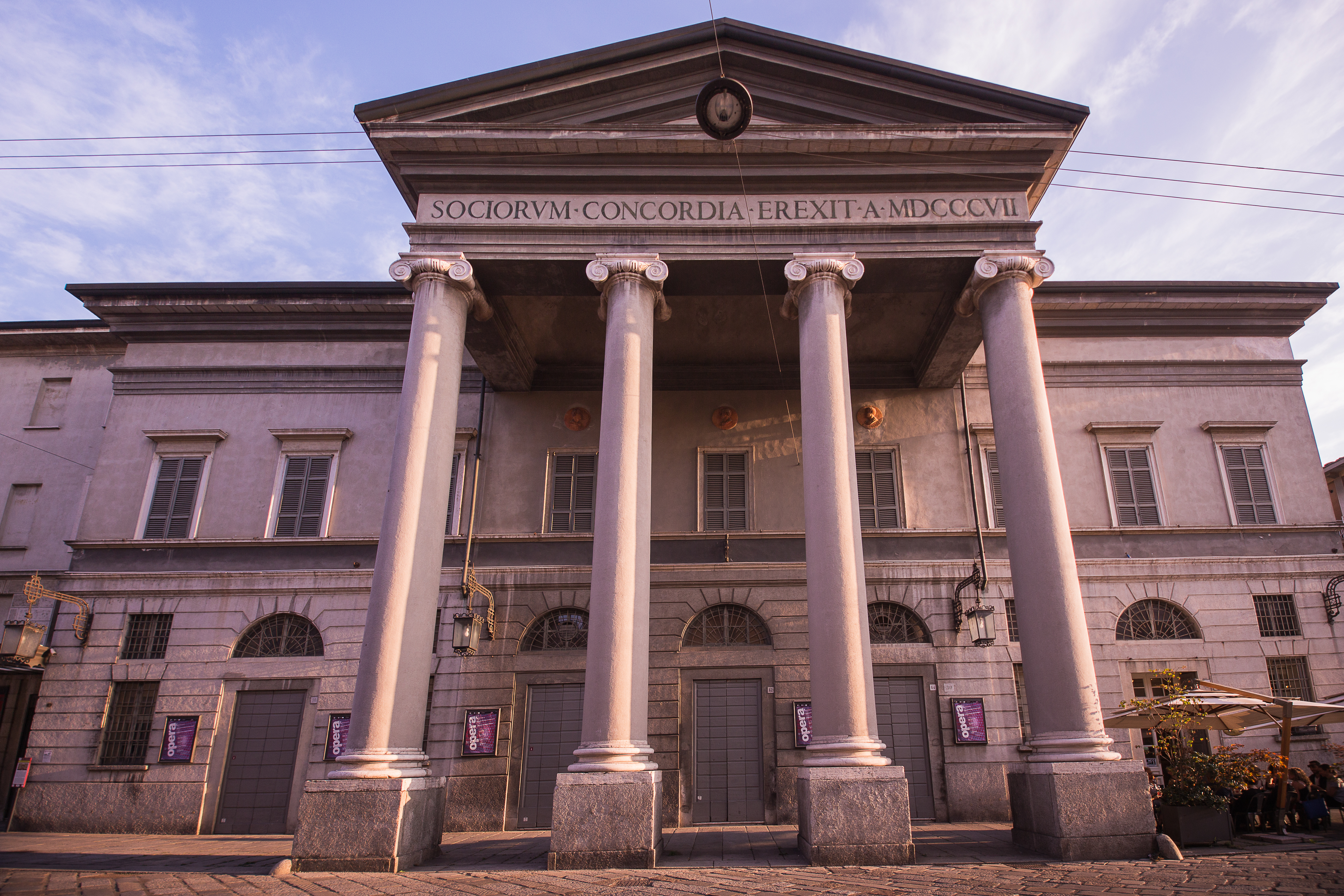
- Exterior of Teatro Amilcare Ponchielli
- Interactive map of Teatro Amilcare Ponchielli
- Former names: Teatro Nazari (1747–1785); Teatro della Società, Nobile Associazione (1785–1806); Teatro della Concordia (1808–1907)
- Address: Corso Vittorio Emanuele II, 52; Cremona; Italy
- Coordinates: 45°07′56″N 10°01′08″E
- Owner: City of Cremona
- Capacity: 1,249

Construction
- Opened: 1747; 279 years ago
- Rebuilt: 1808
- Architect: Luigi Canonica

Website
- www.teatroponchielli.it

The Teatro Amilcare Ponchielli is an opera house located in Cremona, Italy. For more than 250 years it has been that city's primary venue for opera and other theatrical presentations.

The original theatre, built in 1747, was named the Teatro Nazari, but it was renamed as the Teatro della Società in 1785. It was sometimes referred to as the Nobile Associazione. After the original theatre burned down in 1806, construction began on the present theatre soon after. The current theatre was designed by Luigi Canonica and it opened in 1808 under the name the Teatro della Concordia. Its name was changed again to the Teatro Ponchielli in 1907 after the famous native of Cremona, Amilcare Ponchielli.

In 1986 the theatre was purchased by the city of Cremona which renamed it once again as it is known today. The opening performance took place on 4 October and featured performances on the city-owned Stradivarius "Il Cremonese" and Guarneri "del Gesù" violins of 1715 and 1734 respectively.

With its original horseshoe-shaped auditorium, the theatre was remodeled in 1989 to create three box tiers and two galleries with a total of 1,249 seats.
