= Luigi Canonica =

Swiss architect and urban planner

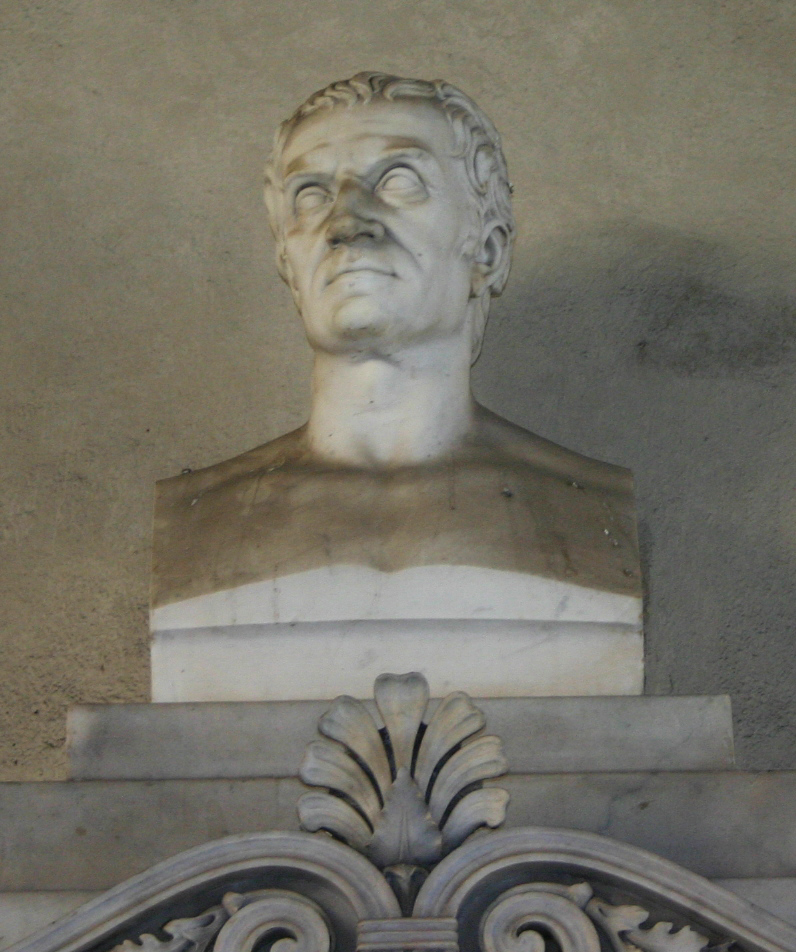
- Bust of Canonica at the Palazzo Brera, Milan
- Born: Cristoforo Maria Luigi Canonica; 9 March 1762; Tesserete, Canton Ticino
- Died: 7 February 1844 (aged 81); Milan, Kingdom of Lombardy–Venetia
- Occupation: Architect
- Movement: Neoclassicism
- Buildings: Arena Civica; Palazzo Brentani; Palazzo Anguissola Antona Traversi

Luigi Canonica (9 March 1762 in Tesserete, Canton Ticino – 7 February 1844 in Milan) was a Swiss architect and urban planner whose prominent career as an exponent of Neoclassicism was spent largely in Milan and Lombardy. He was the designated architect of the short-lived Cisalpine Republic, and, following the fall of the Napoleonic empire, of the kings of Sardinia. In Milan he was assigned to modify Giovanni Antonio Antolini's ambitious project for the Foro Buonaparte and the Arena.

== Biography ==
=== Early life and education ===
Luigi Canonica was a pupil of Giuseppe Piermarini at the Brera Academy, Milan, and later his assistant and collaborator. After the establishment of French rule in 1796, Canonica was appointed State Architect of Milan, replacing Piermarini who was too closely identified with the previous Habsburg regime. He was influenced by contemporary work in France and produced designs conforming closely to the directives of the French administration in Milan under Eugène de Beauharnais. He was not interested in the political and moral aspects of his work but designed formal and functional Neoclassical buildings.

=== State Architect: 1800-1814 ===
In 1800 Canonica made a plan for a ‘Città Bonaparte’ to be built on an area to be made available by the demolition of parts of Milan’s Sforza Castle. This was the first idea for the ‘Foro Bonaparte’, a new administrative centre for the city, for which Giovanni Antonio Antolini also submitted a proposal that was initially accepted but subsequently rejected (1802) on grounds of cost. In 1805 Canonica submitted another design for the area, which responded more effectively to the prevailing economic and political circumstances.

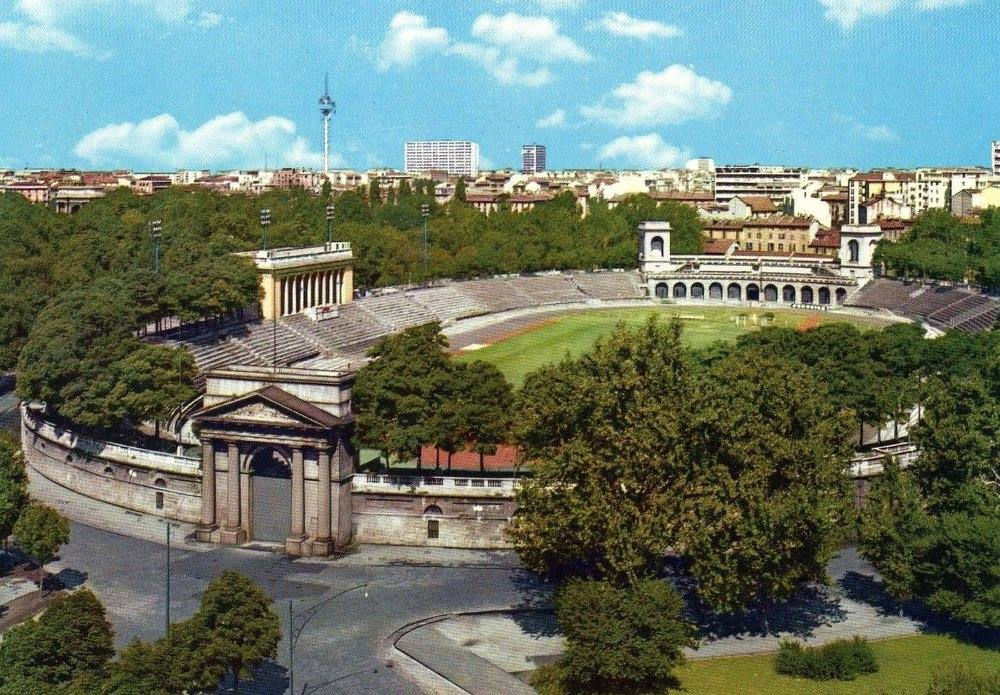
The Arena Civica

His plan differed from Antolini’s in its ‘liberal’ character: it was concerned only with the general layout of the urban area and the façades of the buildings, behind which people could build their living quarters and shops according to their needs. The scheme was never completely realized and parts of the site were simply laid out as wooded landscape; the main work carried out involved the enlargement of the Piazza d’Armi at the castle and construction of the Arena Civica, public gardens and tree-lined avenues.

The triumphal arch planned for the end of the road to Paris, the Strada del Sempione, at the convergence of the avenues following the city walls, was built as the Arco della Pace by Luigi Cagnola. In designing the Arena (1805; completed 1813) Canonica studied the surveys and the ideal reconstruction of the Circus of Caracalla made by Angelo Uggeri for Giovanni Ludovico Bianconi’s Descrizione dei circhi particolarmente di quello di Caracalla (Rome, 1789), and as a result it was strongly imitative of ancient arenas.

As State Architect, Canonica supervised all the decorations erected in Milan for Napoleon’s coronation as King of Italy in 1805. In preparation, he first visited Fontainebleau and Saint-Cloud. His designs included decorations, furnishings, furniture, illuminations, a covered walkway from the Royal Palace of Milan to the cathedral, and the uniforms of the dignitaries present at the ceremony; he thus acted as court architect, decorative designer and costume designer. The decorative structures included a number of temporary triumphal arches: of these, the one built at the Porta Vercellina was later re-erected in stone, the first permanent triumphal arch to be built during the Neoclassical period in Milan.

Following the success of the Arena, Canonica was commissioned to build a series of theatres. He used as his model the tradition of the tiered auditorium, of which the unsurpassed example was La Scala, Milan, built by Piermarini. Canonica’s theatres included the Teatro Carcano (1803), Milan; Teatro della Concordia (1808), Cremona; Teatro Grande (interior, 1811), Brescia; Teatro Re (1813), Milan; and Teatro Sociale (1820–24), Sondrio. At La Scala he enlarged the stage and the adjacent areas (1814). His theatres were designed on a horseshoe plan, with tiers of private boxes placed directly one above the other and a relatively small entrance lobby.

=== Austrian rule ===
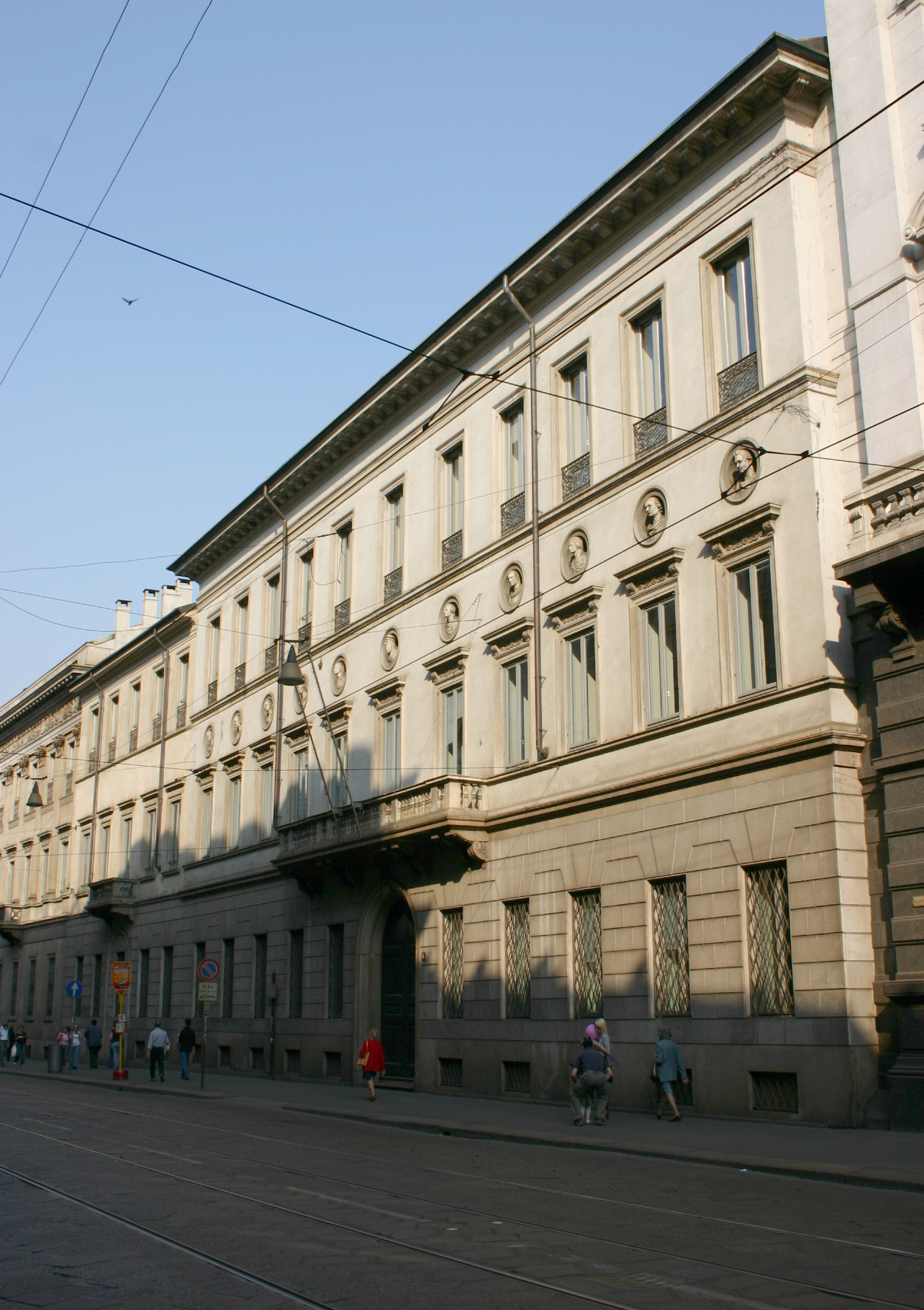
Palazzo Brentani, Milan

When the Austrians returned to Milan, Canonica’s public commissions were cancelled and in 1817 he was dismissed from his post as State Architect. From then on he worked mainly for private or religious patrons and built mostly villas and town houses, such as his own house in Via Sant'Agnese (c. 1815); the Casa Porro-Lambertenghi in Via Monte di Pietà (before 1816); Palazzo Brentani in Via Manzoni (1829–31; now the Banca Commerciale Italiana); and Palazzo Anguissola Antona Traversi (1829–31), all in Milan.

For these buildings he worked to a format consisting of a ground floor with smooth rustication, an optional mezzanine floor and two more floors divided by a string course and a balcony with an iron parapet. This approach produced façades that could be inserted into the most diverse environments. It also created continuous and uniform surfaces that threw into relief their few decorative details. It was immediately imitated and so widely diffused that it gave a characteristic look to the Neoclassical cityscape, which can be considered Canonica’s most significant legacy.

== Gallery ==
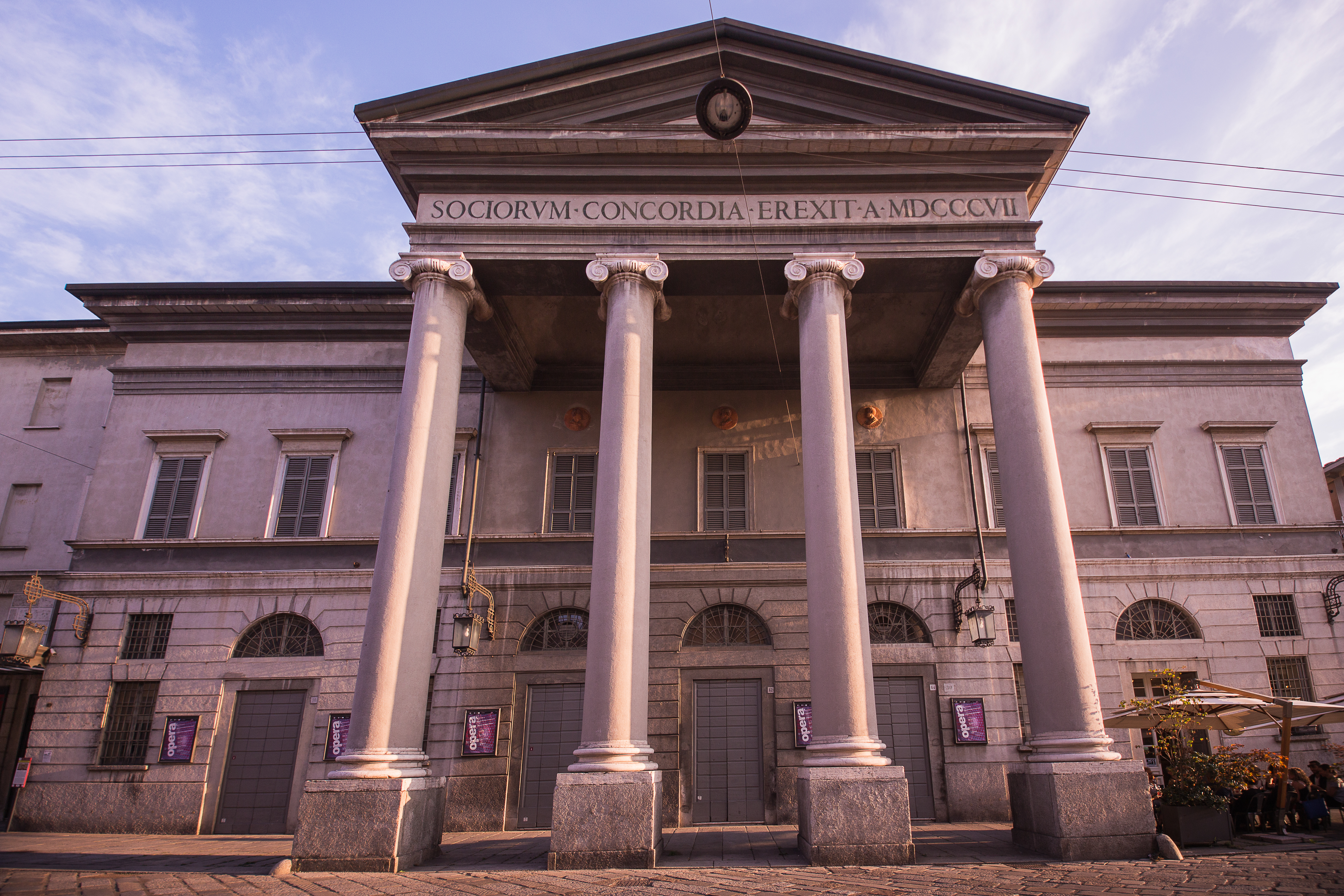
Teatro della Concordia, Cremona

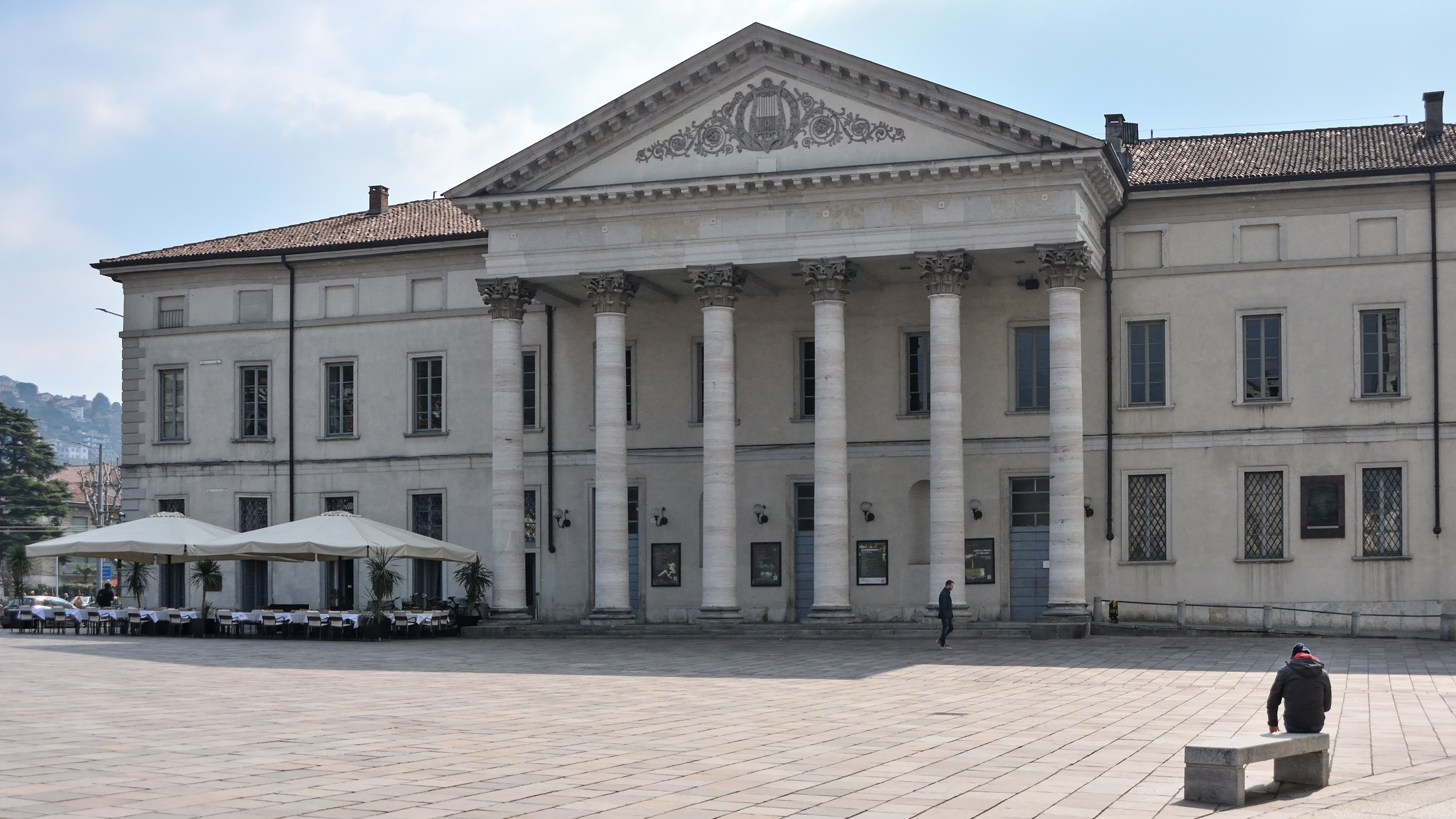
Teatro Sociale, Como

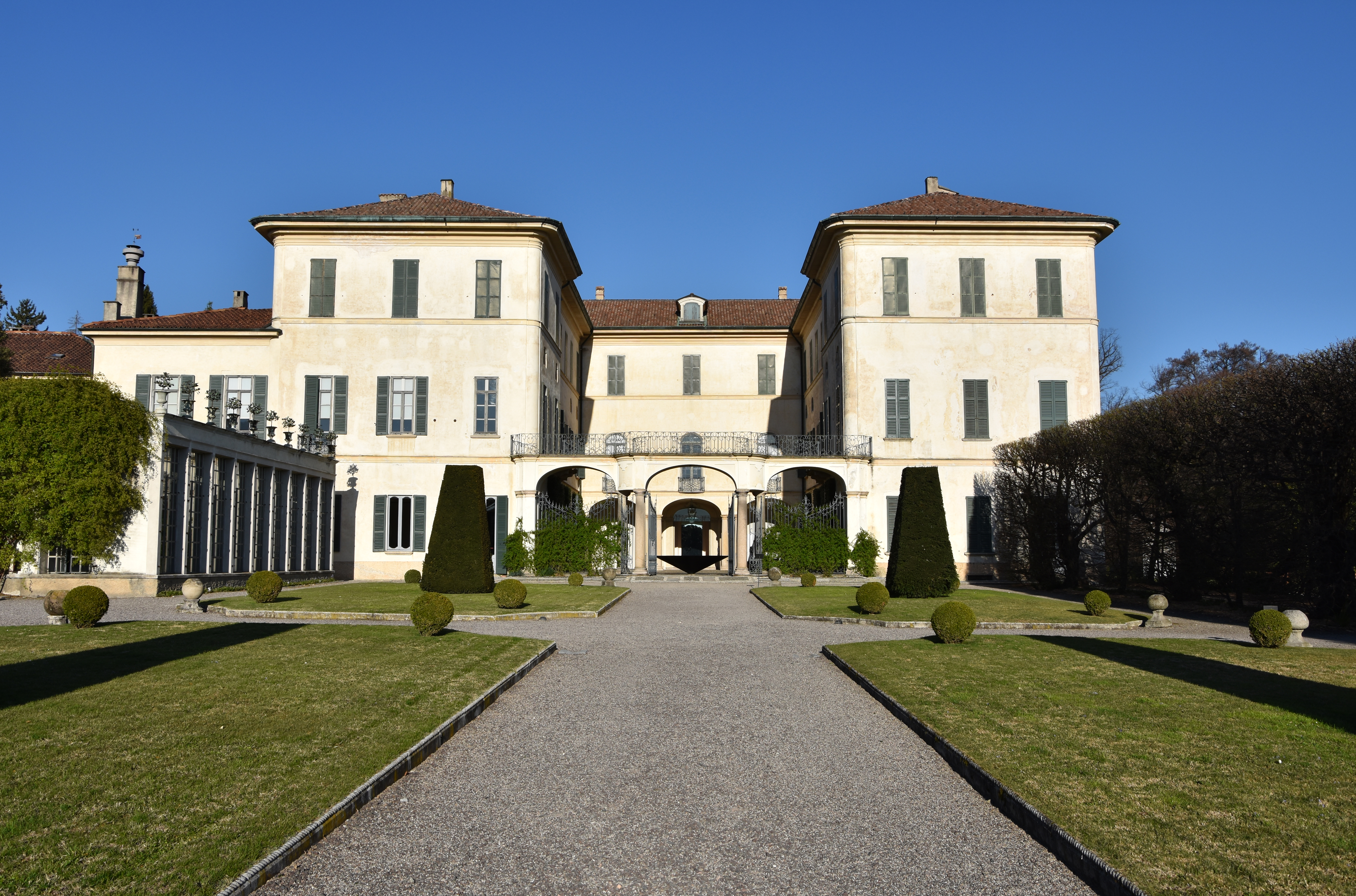
Villa Panza, Varese

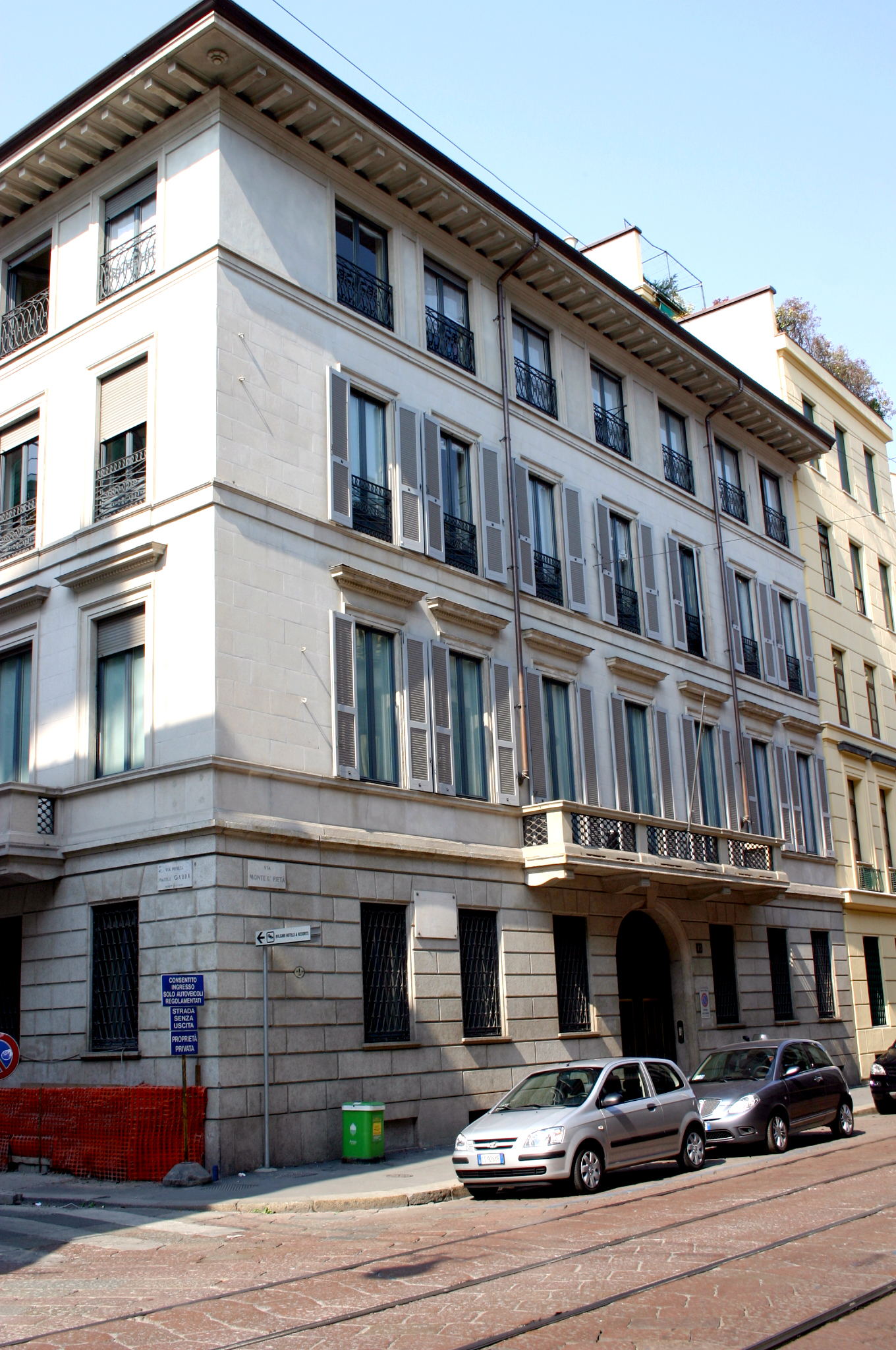
Palazzo Porro-Lambertenghi, Milan

== Bibliography ==
- Gallo, Paola (1996). "Luigi Canonica. Un professionista al servizio dello Stato nella Milano neoclassica". Arte Lombarda. 117 (2): 91–98. JSTOR 43106958.
