= Angelo Uggeri =

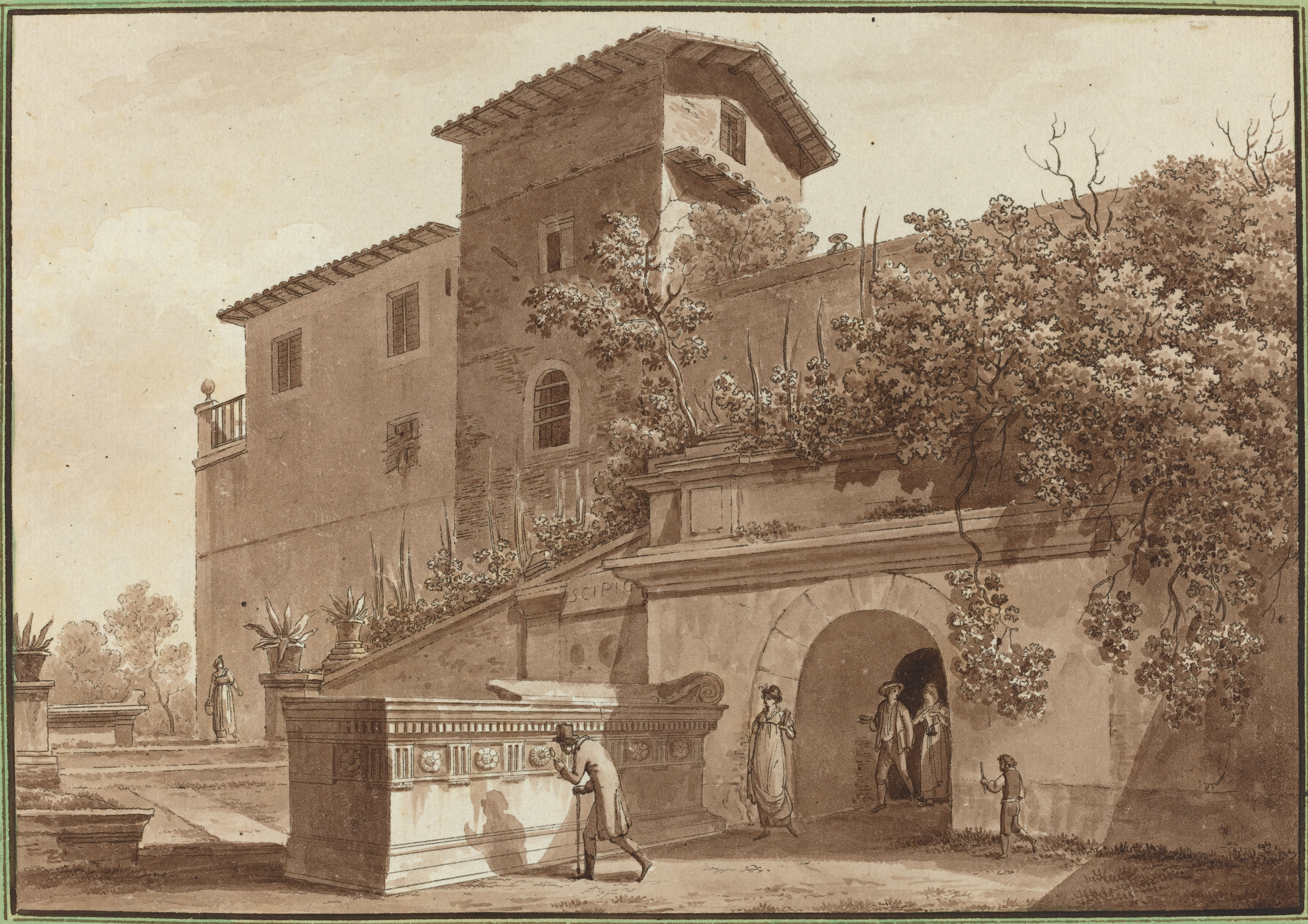
Tomb of the Scipios by Angelo Uggeri, ink drawing at the National Gallery of Art, Washington DC

Angelo Uggeri (1754–1837) was an Italian abbot, graphic artist, and antiquarian.

He was born in Lombardy. He studied art and architecture at Cremona; but joined the ecclesiastical profession. from 1788 worked in Rome. In 1823, Pope Leo XII named him as secretary to the commission planning reconstruction of the Basilica of Saint Paul Outside the Walls. In 1800 while in Rome, he published Giornate pittoreschi degli edifici antichi di Roma e dei contorni.
