= Ignazio Jacometti =

Italian sculptor (1819-1883)

Ignazio Jacometti (16 January 1819 in Rome – 22 April 1883 in Rome) was an Italian sculptor. He was a professor of sculpture at the Accademia di San Luca.

== Biography ==
He was born the third of five children to Antonio and Anna Maria Lang. His family was linked to the ancient aristocratic family of the Orsini. His parents initially wanted him to study law, but in 1835, Ignazio abandoned the Collegio Nazareno, where he had enrolled in 1828, and attended instead the Accademia di San Luca in Rome.

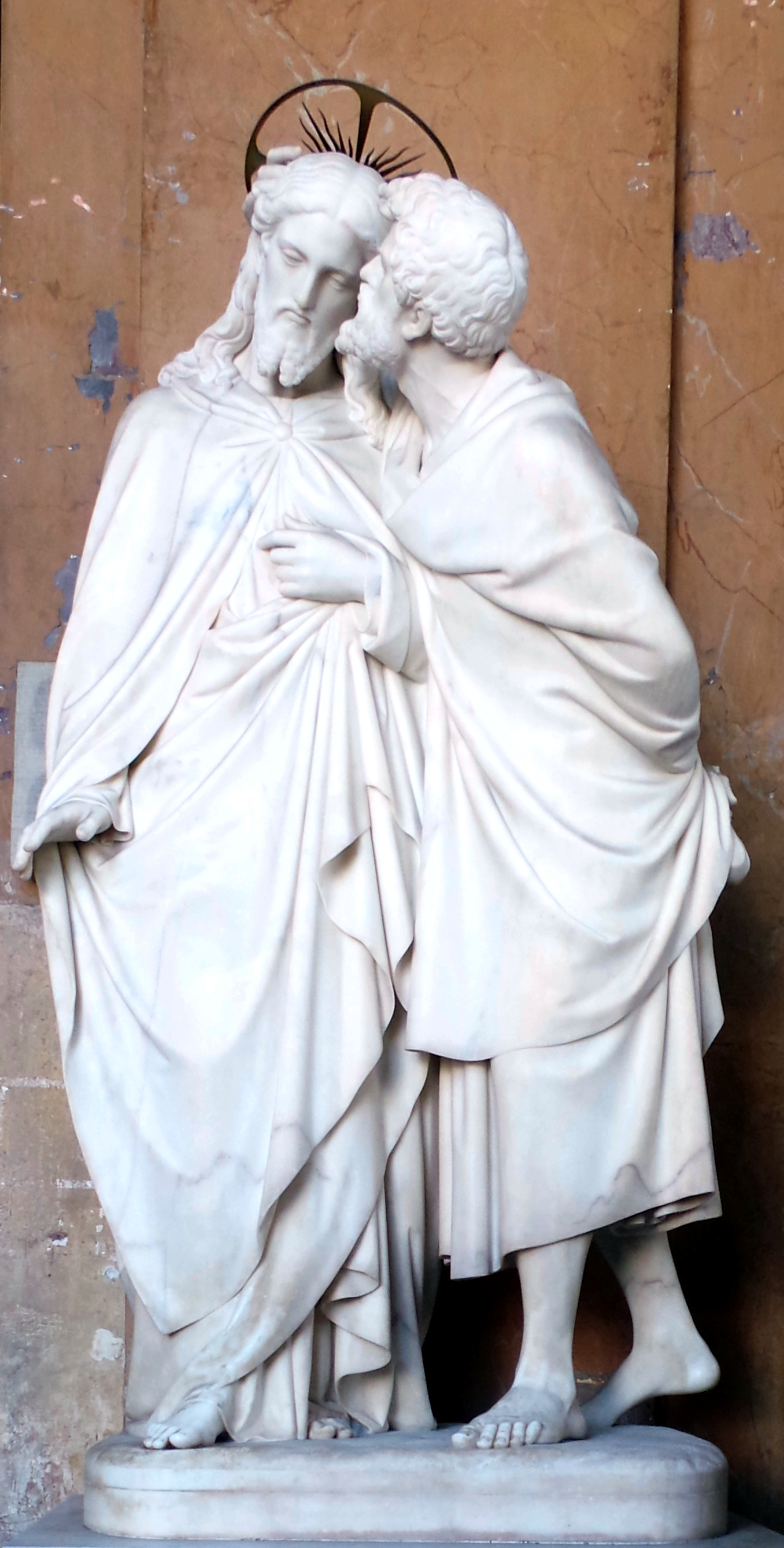
Bacio di Giuda

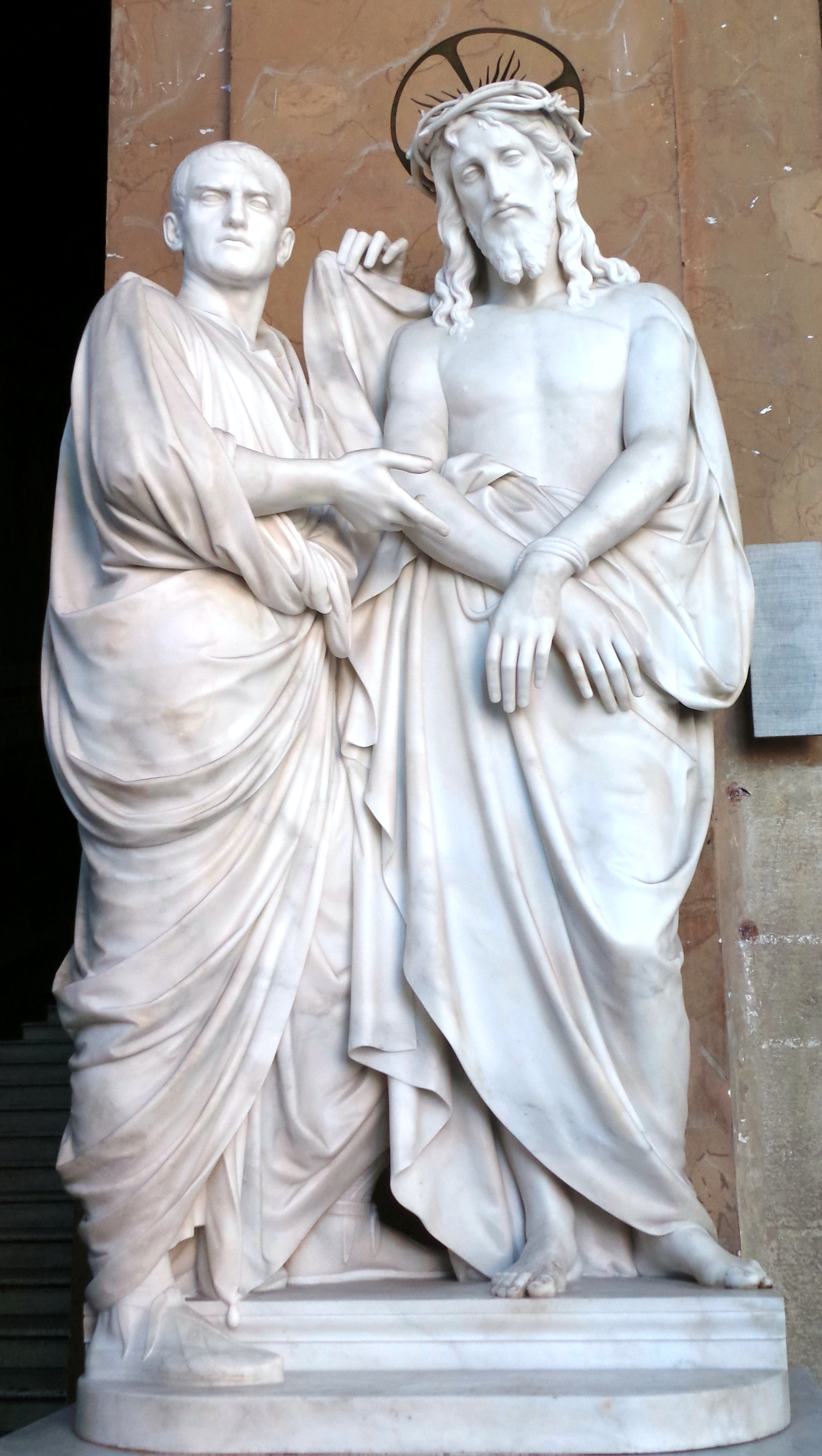
Ecce Homo

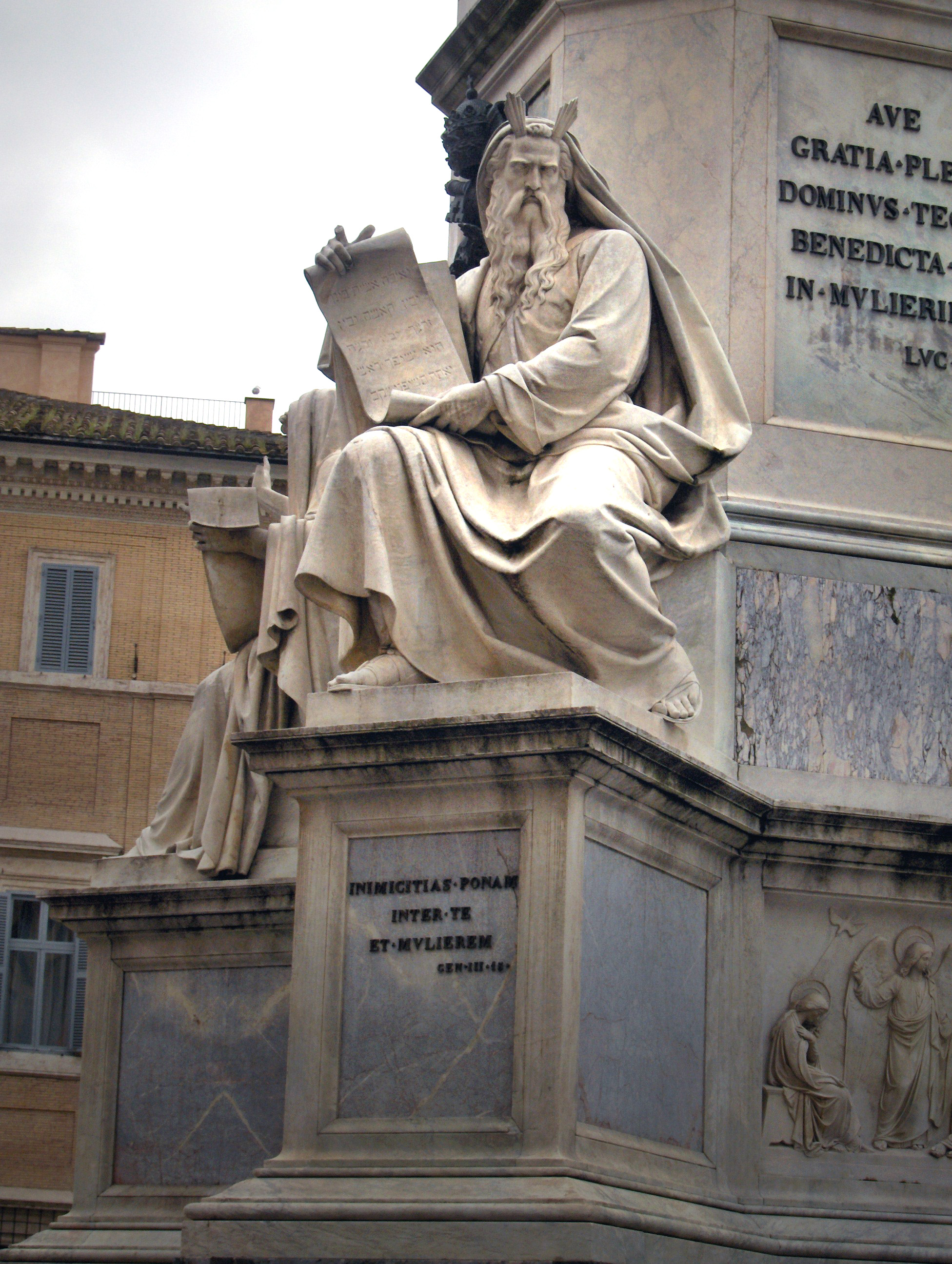
Statue of Moses

By 1850, he had a studio in Piazza Barberini, just below where he lived, where he sculpted the statue of Bacio di Giuda (Kiss of Judas), encouraged by the painter Tommaso Minardi, professor in the Accademia di San Luca. When Pope Pius IX visited the studio in August 1852, he decided to acquire the sculpture and place it on 6 December 1855, flanking the atrium at the base of the Scala Santa at San Giovanni in Laterano. In 1854, the secretary of the Papal state, Giovanni Antonelli, commissioned the statuary group of Ecce Homo, which now stands across from the Bacio group.

Ignazio completed a statue of Moses (1857) for the Column of the Immacolata that was erected in 1856 in front of the palace of Propaganda Fide in Piazza di Spagna. It is on one of the four pedestals upholding the column, along with statues of David, Ezekiel, and Isaiah.

In 1855 he was resident professor at the Accademia di S. Luca, then in 1861, chair of nude sculpture at the Accademia di San Luca. That same year he became councillor of the institute and secretary of the academic council until 1863. In 1879 he was elected president but his office lasted only a year.

In 1857, he completed the stucco model of the Deposition; a marble counterpart was never completed. In the Basilica of San Paolo fuori le Mura, which had been recently been rebuilt after a fire in 1823, Jacometti completed the angels that hold the heraldic shield of Pius IX that found over the entrance doorway. The shield was carved by Giovanni Meli. He also made the statue of St Peter at the end of the nave, flanking the entrance to the tomb of Paul. Alessandro Revelli completed the paired St Paul with the sword inside the church.

In the center of the piazzetta before the church of San Bartolomeo all'Isola is a four-sided guglia (pyramidal shape) with saints in niches, erected here in 1869.

In 1870, he was nominated director of the Papal Galleries and Museums, and was influential in compiling an inventory of the possessions. In the year, Pius IX named him knight, then commendatore of the Order of St Gregory the Great. In 1879 he was president of the Academy of St. Luke for a year. His son, Francesco, published a biography of his life.

== Works ==
He also completed numerous funereal and other monuments. Among those are the monuments for:

- Count Luigi Pelagallo in San Bartolomeo della Pietà a Fermo (1854)
- Luigi Lezzani in the church of San Girolamo degli Schiavoni (1862)
- Cardinal Gaspare Bernardo Pianetti di Jesi, bas-relief of the Madonna and four angels for the funereal monument in the church of San Salvatore in Lauro (1862)
- Abbot Pigiani in the church of Santa Maria sopra Minerva (1863)
- Countess Piccolomini Moroni Mozzi in the church of Santa Maria sopra Minerva (1866).
- Monument to Pius IX in the piazza of the church of San Bartolomeo all'Isola (1869)
- St Paul of the Cross one of the 39 Founders statues in St Peter's Basilica (1876)
- Statue of Pius IX in prayer (1880), commissioned by Pope Leo XIII for the crypt of the basilica di Santa Maria Maggiore.
- Madonna with four angels for the monument of the Immaculate Conception in Santiago, Chile
- Design for Monument to the Immaculate Conception was commissioned for Dublin in 1881.
