= 2018 Rome escalator accident =

2018 escalator accident in Rome, Italy

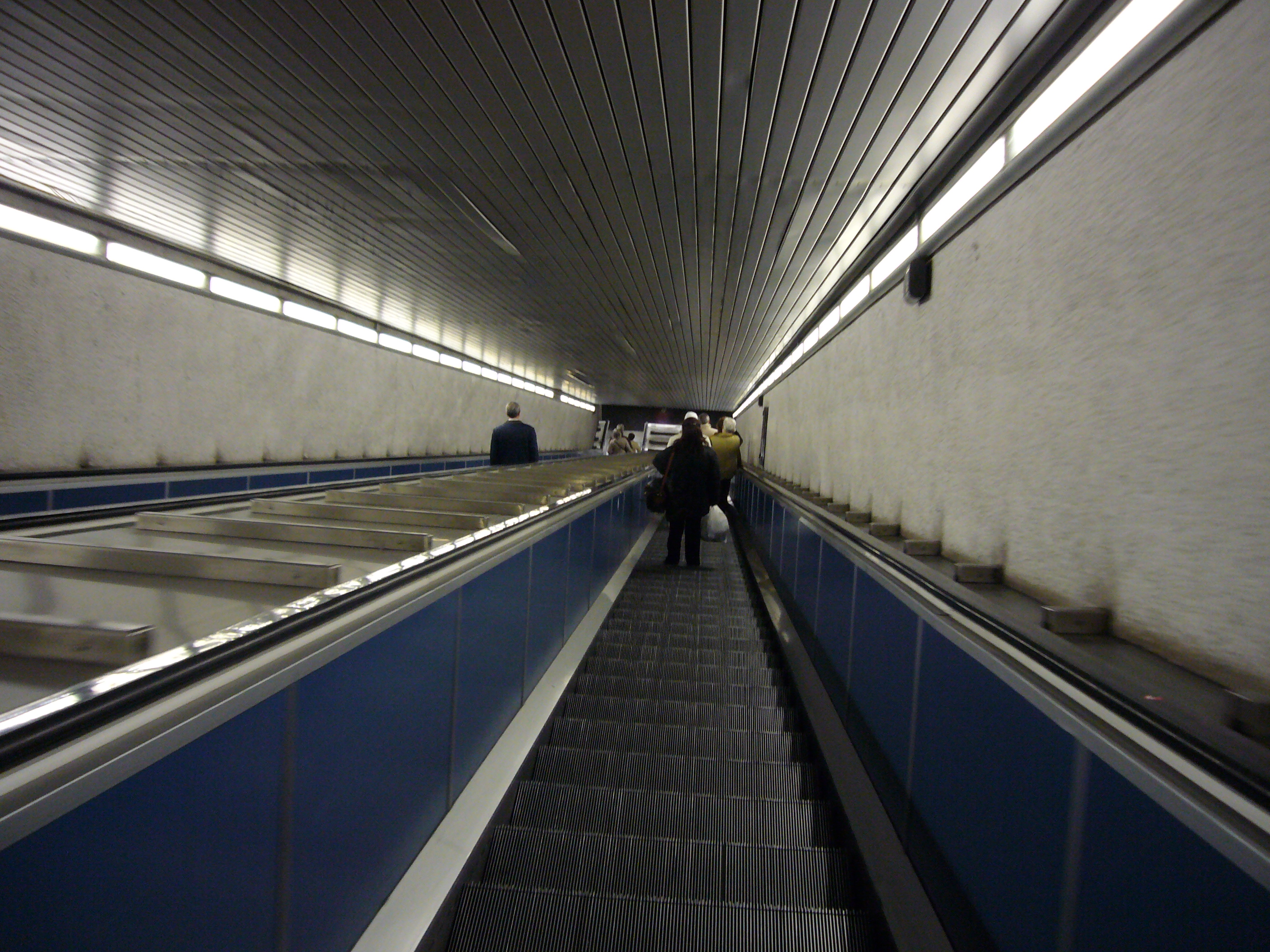
- An escalator at Repubblica station, photographed in 2006
- Date: October 23, 2018
- Time: 19:00 (CEST)
- Venue: Repubblica – Teatro dell'Opera, Rome Metro
- Location: Rome, Italy
- Cause: Tampering and improper maintenance and certification
- Injuries: 20+ people injured, including 7 seriously injured
- Convicted: Ettore Bucci; Alessandro Galeotti; Filippo Nazario; Raffaele Santulli; 10 employees of Metro Roma
- Charges: Fraud in public procurement; Grievous bodily harm

On 23 October 2018, twenty-four people, mostly fans of the CSKA Moscow football team, were injured after a crowded escalator at a Rome Metro station malfunctioned. It suddenly sped up, and hurled people down the escalator.

== Background ==
Repubblica is a station on Line A of the Rome Metro, originally opened in 1980. It is one of four stations on the line with no elevators or stairlifts, being accessed only by escalators.

== Incident ==
The escalator at the Repubblica Metro station in Rome malfunctioned on 23 October. The station was crowded due to many fans traveling to the Rome Olympic stadium to watch the UEFA Champions League game between CSKA Moscow and AS Roma. It was initially reported that a group of CSKA fans going down into the station were seen to be jumping and singing before the incident, although this was later determined to be false. The incident was caught on video, where the escalator suddenly sped up with little time for those at the bottom to get out of the way.

Some fans attempted to escape by utilizing the median to either side to slide down, or by attempting to get to the other escalator. A photo was released of the escalator stairs after they were stopped crumpled at the bottom with jagged and exposed metal plates.

== Victims ==
More than 20 people were injured, 7 seriously. One person's foot was partially crushed in the incident, while at least 2 others required surgery for leg injuries. Some of the injured were trapped between the metal plates of the steps at the bottom of the escalator.

== Investigation and prosecution ==
Rome mayor Virginia Raggi issued a request for a formal inquest over the cause of the malfunction. The entire Repubblica station was closed for 246 days so that investigators and firefighters could carry out all investigations and rescue operations. Metro stations Spagna and Barberini, also on Line A, were also temporarily shut after the accident. A representative from ATAC, Rome's public transport company, issued a statement that "all maintenance checks of the escalator were carried out regularly and the results were in accordance to the norms."

In the week following the accident, protests against Raggi raised concerns about her failing to address the city's issues such as the accident and lack of funds for city upkeep and infrastructure. Meanwhile, police after studying the accident footage concluded that the fans were not jumping on the escalator. The CSKA fans released a statement on 24 October that; "Italian officials, without conducting an investigation, were quick to accuse us of the accident. Apparently, they are trying to shun the responsibility of what happened."

In March 2019, Barberini station had a similar accident which after investigation of the two incidents was determined to similarly be caused by the disabling of safety systems by improper maintenance.

By September 2019, as part of the ongoing investigation and in the context of evidence found of tampering and false documentation, three ATAC employees and one Metro Roma employee were charged with fraud in public procurement and aggravated personal injury, and "precautionary measures" were taken by the authorities against the four individuals.

By December 2020, the investigation of the incident concluded, with the finding that the safety systems of the escalator were tampered with, leading to the escalator work being falsely certified as complete; the primary brake had not been serviced and was operating below specification. Additionally, employees of Metro Roma disabled a brake wedge via the use of plastic cable ties in an effort to prevent the escalators from stopping and an alarm triggering, with the knowledge of ATAC officials. The resulting report noted the role of Metro Roma technicians alongside several ATAC employees who were found to be complicit.

Four ATAC managers, Ettore Bucci (employee acting as sole manager of the proceedings), Alessandro Galeotti (operations manager for the Repubblica and Barberini stations), Filippo Nazario (director of maintenance contract execution), and Raffaele Santulli (director of the maintenance and infrastructure department), as well as ten employees of Metro Roma were charged, with the latter group charged with fraud in public procurement and causing grievous bodily harm. The prosecutor noted that "Metroroma technicians could not have acted without the complicity of ATAC employees."

== Primary sources ==
- Incidente Su Una Scala Mobile Della Metropolitana Di Roma, Linea A, Stazione Repubblica, Avvenuto In Data 23/10/2018 [Escalator Accident on the Rome Metro, Line A, Station Repubblica, on 23 October 2018] (PDF) (Report) (in Italian). Ministero delle Infrastrutture e dei Trasporti. 27 July 2020. Archived (PDF) from the original on 22 June 2024.
