= Torre dei Capocci =

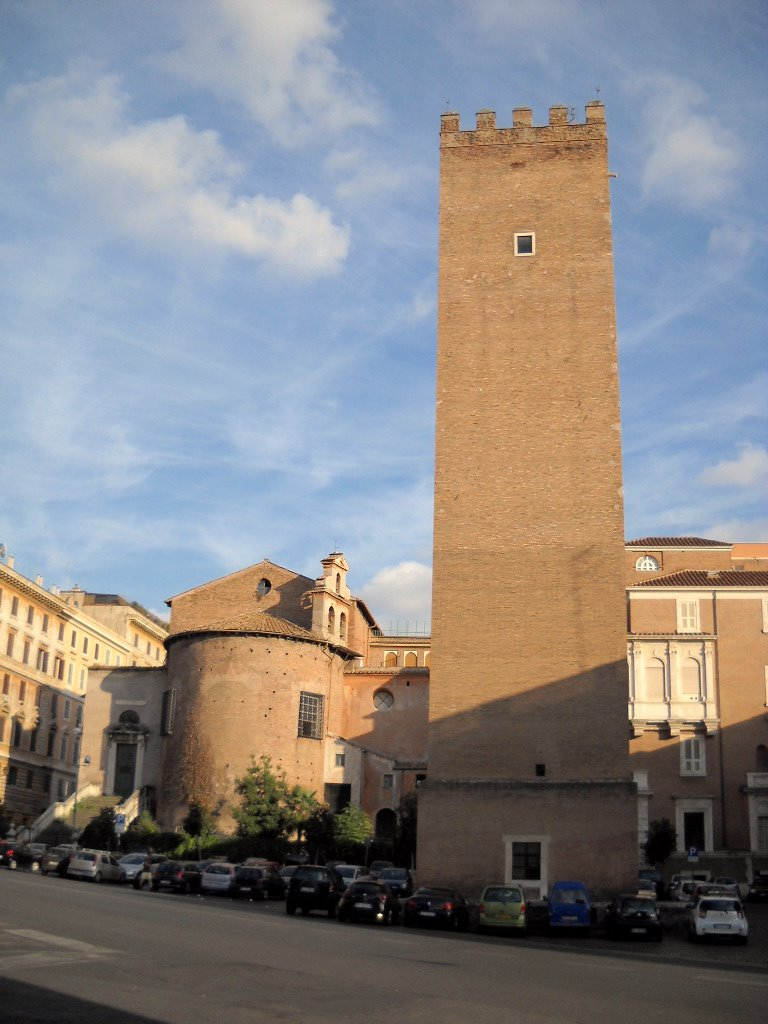
- Capocci Tower in Rome
- Click on the map for a fullscreen view

General information
- Location: Rome, Italy
- Coordinates: 41°53′42″N 12°29′51″E

Torre dei Capocci (Engl.: "The Tower of the Capocci") is a tower at San Martino ai Monti square in Rome, Italy.

== Description ==
Torre dei Capocci, along with Torre dei Graziani, constitutes a kind of monumental entrance to top of the hill Esquilino.

== History ==
Built by the family of Arcioni in the 12th century, it afterwards went to the Capocci, a noble family from Viterbo. These erected around the tower a number of houses, which no longer exist, but which made the building a sort of citadel. The tower is 36 m (118 ft) high with seven floors, a square base, and windows framed in travertine. The terrace, bordered by a brick parapet, is edged by crenellated battlements on each side, and emerges at the output hopper of the staircase.

Preceded by Campo Verano	Landmarks of Rome; Torre dei Capocci	Succeeded by Column of the Immaculate Conception, Rome
