= Spagna (Rome Metro) =

Rome metro station

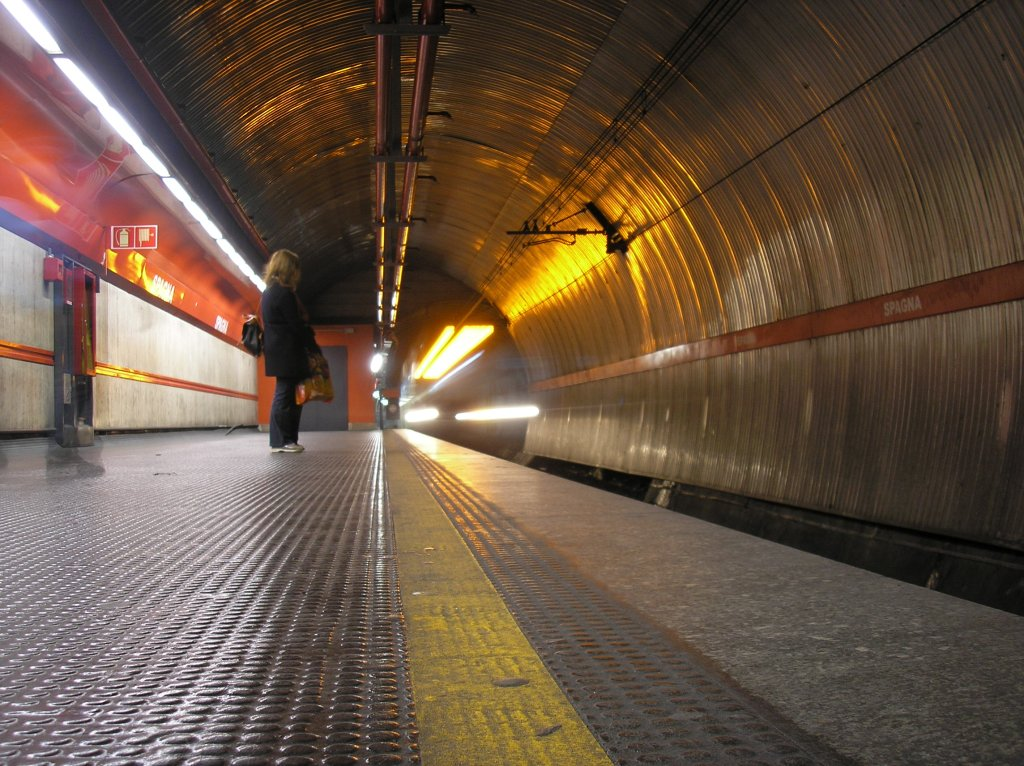

General information
- Coordinates: 41°54′23.4″N 12°28′59″E
- Owner: ATAC
- Platforms: 1 island platform
- Tracks: 2

Construction
- Structure type: Underground

History
- Opened: 1980; 46 years ago

Services
Preceding station	Rome Metro	Following station
Flaminio towards Battistini	Line A	Barberini towards Anagnina
Location
- Click on the map to see marker

Spagna is an underground station on Line A of the Rome Metro, in the rione Campo Marzio, which was inaugurated in 1980.

The station is named after the nearby Piazza di Spagna: its main exit is on Vicolo del Bottino, a short stretch of road that leads to the square. Another exit, connected by a series of moving walkways, is located near Porta Pinciana and the homonymous entrance to Villa Borghese.

== History ==
The Spagna station was built as part of the first section (from Anagnina to Ottaviano) of the Line A of the Rome Metro, which came into service in 1980.

The project of an interchange with the future Line D was abandoned in the autumn of 2012.

On 23 March 2019, after that Barberini was impounded for a problem with the escalators, Spagna was also closed. The closure lasted about a month and a half: in fact, the station reopened to the public at 6 pm on 7 May 2019.

== Services ==
This station has:

- Parking at Villa Borghese
- Escalators
- Elevators
- Ticket office
- Ticket machine

== Interchanges ==
- ATAC bus stop

== Located nearby ==
- Piazza di Spagna/Spanish Steps
- Via del Babuino
- Via dei Condotti
- Spanish Embassy to the Holy See
- De La Ville Hotel Intercontinental
- Trinità dei Monti
- Sallustiano Obelisk
- Colonna dell'Immacolata
- Palazzo di Propaganda Fide
- Keats–Shelley Memorial House
- Villa Medici
- Villa Borghese
- Pincio
- Piazza Colonna
- Palazzo Montecitorio
- Palazzo Chigi
- Column of Marcus Aurelius
- Galleria Alberto Sordi
- Via del Corso
- Santa Maria in Via
- Palazzo Borghese
- Ara Pacis
- Mausoleum of Augustus

== Bibliography ==
- Vittorio Formigari; Piero Muscolino (1983). La metropolitana a Roma. Notizie dalle origini e ricordi degli autori. Cortona: Calosci. ISBN 88-7785-197-X.
