= Chinea =

Feudal tribute from Naples to the pope

The Chinèa was the name attached to a tribute paid by the Kings of Naples as vassals to the Popes. The tribute was apparently first recognized by the Norman King of Sicily in 1059. The Chinea reached its greatest magnitude from about 1550 to 1776, with grand temporary structures being erected during the celebration all over Rome in honor of the Pope. The Chinea ceremony itself was instituted under Charles I of Naples and Pope Clement IV, and lasted in ceremonial form till 1776, and as a monetary obligation until 1855.

The ceremony included the gift of a white horse, elegantly attired and carrying by the late 1700s the equivalent of 7,000 ducats in silver. The presentation took place annually on June 29, the Feast of Saints Peter and Paul, and was followed by elaborate festivities in Rome. The horse itself was paraded in Saint Peter's Basilica. The presentation was always made by a Neapolitan nobleman, including over the years, members of the Colonna, Sanseverino, or Carafa families. The term chinea is thought to derive from the French word for a Hackney horse: (haquennée).

In 1776, on the pretext of mob rowdiness during the ceremony, King Ferdinand IV of Naples and his foreign minister, Bernardo Tanucci, as well as the philosopher Domenico Caracciolo, attempted to eliminate the tribute, but in the end while the ceremony and accompanying sanction of royal rule were eliminated, a simple monetary tribute continued. In 1855, during the papacy of Pius IX, in the hope of abolishing the tradition altogether, Ferdinand II of the Two Sicilies paid 10,000 scudi for the Column of the Immaculate Conception in Piazza di Spagna, Rome.
