= Mentana =

- Comune
- Comune di Mentana
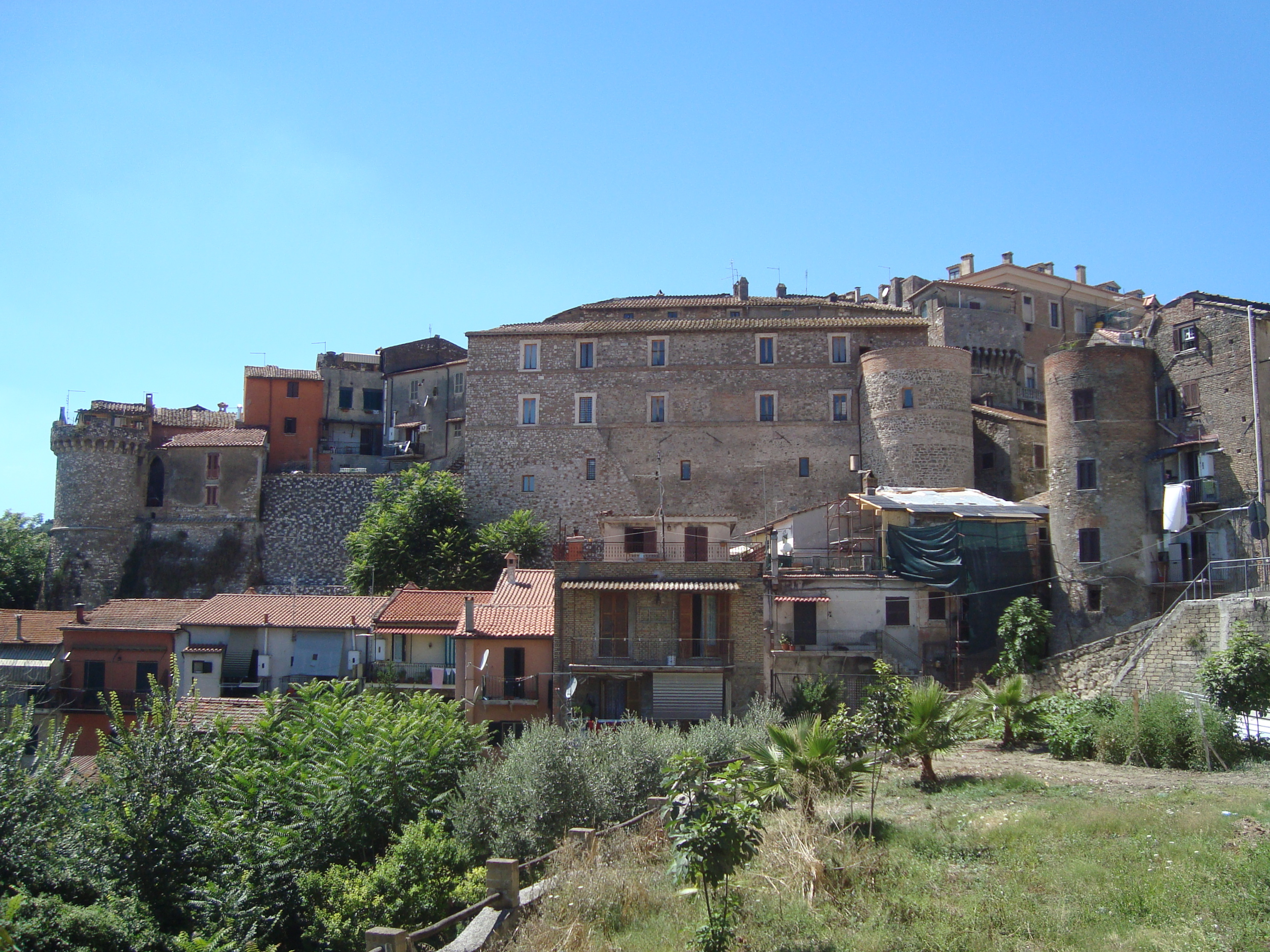
- View of Mentana

- Coat of arms

- Location within Italy Location within Lazio
- Coordinates: 42°01′N 12°39′E
- Country: Italy
- Region: Lazio
- Metropolitan city: Rome (RM)
- Frazioni: Casali, Castelchiodato, Mezzaluna

Government
  - Mayor: Marco Benedetti

Area
  - Total: 24.27 km^{2} (9.37 sq mi)
- Elevation: 150 m (490 ft)

Population (31 August 2020)
  - Total: 23,219
  - Density: 956.7/km^{2} (2,478/sq mi)
- Demonym: Mentanesi
- Time zone: UTC+1 (CET)
  - Summer (DST): UTC+2 (CEST)
- Postal code: 00013
- Dialing code: 06
- Patron saint: St. Nicholas of Bari
- Saint day: December 6
- Website: Official website

Mentana is a town and comune, former bishopric and present Latin Catholic titular see in the Metropolitan City of Rome, Lazio, central Italy. It is located 29 kilometres (18 mi) north-east of Rome and has a population of about 23,000.

== History ==
Mentana is a town located in the region of Lazio in central Italy. The town's name in ancient times was Nomentum, to which the Via Nomentana led from Rome. According to Livy, the town was part of the Latin League, which went to war with Rome during the reign of Rome's king Lucius Tarquinius Priscus. Nomentum was one of a number of towns captured by Tarquinius.

It was a Latin town, but was considered by some to be Sabine, and, like Fidenae and Ficulea, was excluded from the first region by Augustus, who made the Anio river its northern boundary. The city was part of the League defeated by Rome in the Battle of Lake Regillus, and was captured definitively in 338 BC.

Subsequently, Nomentum received the status of civitas sine suffragio, and in its municipal constitution the chief magistrate bore the title of dictator, even in imperial times. Pliny and Martial often praised the fertility of its neighbourhood. Seneca the Younger affirmed on multiple occasions having property and retreating to Nomentum. This property contained a villa and vineyards, probably acquired just before his withdrawal from politics.

In 741, it was briefly occupied by the Lombards, and the inhabitants moved to a new centre on the Via Nomentana, which was more easily defendable. On 23 November 799, it was the site of the meeting of Pope Leo III and Charlemagne.

The Castle of Nomentum was a possession of the Roman family of the Crescenzi in the 10th and 11th century. In 1058 it was destroyed by the Normans, and the population was drastically reduced. The castle was acquired by the Capocci family, and later the Holy See entrusted it to the Benedictine monks of San Paolo fuori le Mura.

In the 15th century, it was under the control of the Orsini family. In 1484, it was damaged by an earthquake. In 1594, it became a fief of the Perett family, first under Michele Perett of Venafro, and then in 1655, it came under the control of Marcantonio Borghese and the House of Borghese.

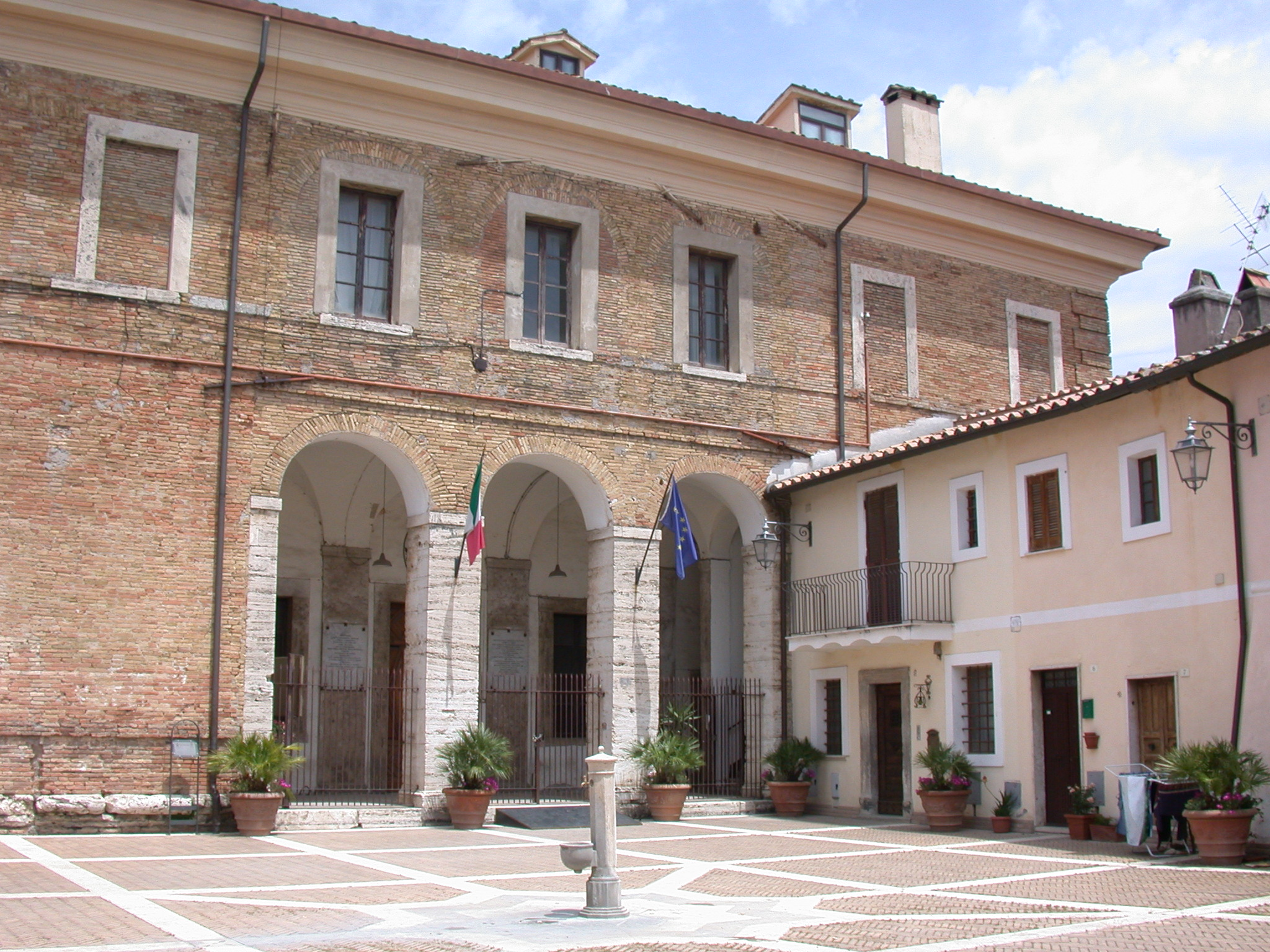
Inner square of the castle in Mentana.

On 3 November 1867, the city was the site of the Battle of Mentana between French-Papal troops and the Italian volunteers led by Giuseppe Garibaldi, who were attempting to capture Rome in order to incorporate it into the newly unified Kingdom of Italy. The battle ended in a victory by the French-Papal troops. In Mentana, the monument Italian: Ara dei Caduti (Altar of the Fallen) is built over the mass grave of the Italian patriots who died in the battle.

== Ecclesiastical History ==
In 408 AD Nomento is mentioned as an episcopal see (established circa 40 AD), and in February 593 it gained the territory of the suppressed annexed the Roman Catholic Diocese of Passo Curese (Cures Sabinorum, Curi).

In May 944 it was suppressed, its territory being merged into the diocese of Vescovio.

The diocese was nominally restored as a Latin Catholic titular bishopric in 1966.

It has had the following incumbents, of the lowest (episcopal) and once archiepiscopal (intermediary) ranks:

- Emanuele Gerada (1967.02.15 – 1973.11.08)
- Titular Archbishop Emanuele Gerada (1973.11.08 – 2011.01.21)
- Habib Chamieh, Mariamite Maronite Order (O.M.M., Aleppians) (2013.04.17 – ...), Apostolic Administrator of San Charbel en Buenos Aires of the Maronites (Argentina).

== Main sights ==
- The Castle (c. 1000), housing the Archaeological Museum and is a site of art exhibitions.
- Palazzo Crescenzio
- Funerary Monument of the Appulei, a 2nd-century BC travertine frieze
- Museum of the Risorgimento
- Science Museum.
- The Nature Preserve of Nomentum includes the Trentani Park and the Macchia (Maquis shrubland) of Gattacieca, the remains of the ancient city as well as a necropolis of the 8th century BC.

== Source and External links ==
- GCatholic, with titular incumbent biography links
