= Barberini – Fontana di Trevi =

Rome metro station

Barberini Fontana di Trevi
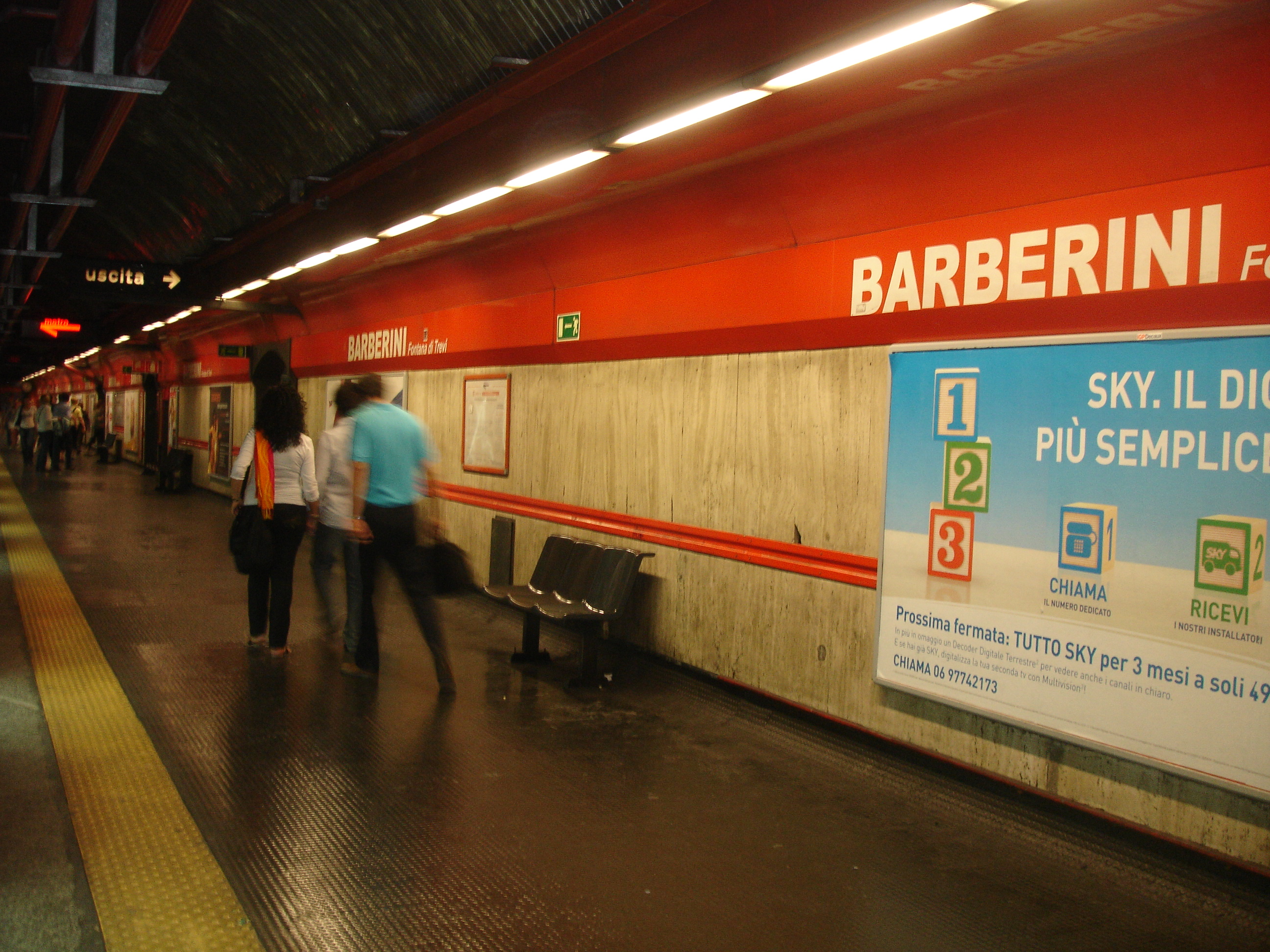

General information
- Coordinates: 41°54′14″N 12°29′20″E
- Owner: ATAC
- Tracks: 2

Construction
- Structure type: Underground

History
- Opened: 1980; 46 years ago

Services
Preceding station	Rome Metro	Following station
Spagna towards Battistini	Line A	Repubblica towards Anagnina
Location
- Click on the map to see marker

Barberini–Fontana di Trevi is an underground station on Line A of the Rome Metro, inaugurated in 1980 and situated under Piazza Barberini in Trevi. Originally, the station was simply named Barberini, and the name was extended in 2000.

The entrance hall of the station accommodates some mosaics of the Rome Artemetro Prize. The creators of the displayed mosaics are Graziano Navy and Heinz Mark.

The station was closed on 21 March 2019 after a fault was experienced on the escalators. A partial reopening of the station was planned for 8 December 2019 but it did not take place. in January 2020 local authorities reported that an escalator had failed a safety check, further delaying the station's reopening.

== Services ==
This station has: Escalators

== Located nearby ==
- Piazza Barberini
- Fontana del Tritone
- Fontana delle Api
- Via Veneto
- Santa Maria della Concezione in Campo Marzio
- Via del Tritone
- Via Bissolati
- Via Barberini
- Via Sistina
- Via delle Quattro Fontane
- Quirinale
- Quirinal Palace
- Palazzo Barberini
- Le Quattro Fontane
- Piazza del Quirinale
- Trevi Fountain
- Santi Vincenzo e Anastasio, with the tomb of Pinelli
- Piazza San Bernardo
- Piazza San Silvestro
- Piazza Santi Apostoli
- Madonna dell'Archetto
- Palazzo del Bufalo
- Santa Maria in Trivio
- Santa Maria in Via
