= Santa Maria della Concezione in Campo Marzio =

Syriac Catholic church in Rome

- Church of Saint Mary of the Conception in the Field of Mars
- Chiesa di Santa Maria della Concezione in Campo Marzio
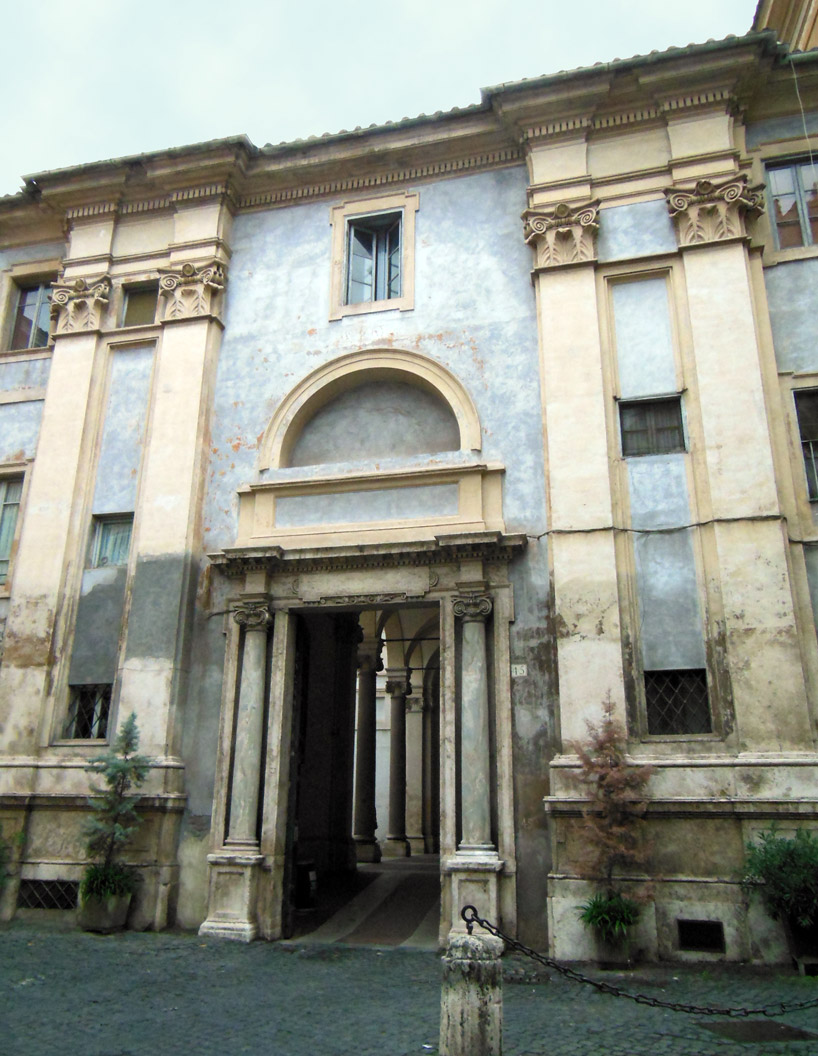
- The facade of Santa Maria della Concezione
- Click on the map for a fullscreen view
- 41°54′05″N 12°28′36″E
- Location: Piazza in Campo Marzio 45, Campo Marzio, Rome
- Country: Italy
- Language(s): Syriac, Syrian Arabic
- Denomination: Catholic Church
- Sui iuris church: Syriac Catholic Church
- Tradition: West Syriac Rite

History
- Status: National church
- Founded: 1564
- Dedication: Immaculate Conception

Architecture
- Architect(s): Giacomo della Porta, Giovanni Antonio de' Rossi
- Architectural type: Renaissance Baroque
- Groundbreaking: 1562
- Completed: 1660

Administration
- Diocese: Rome

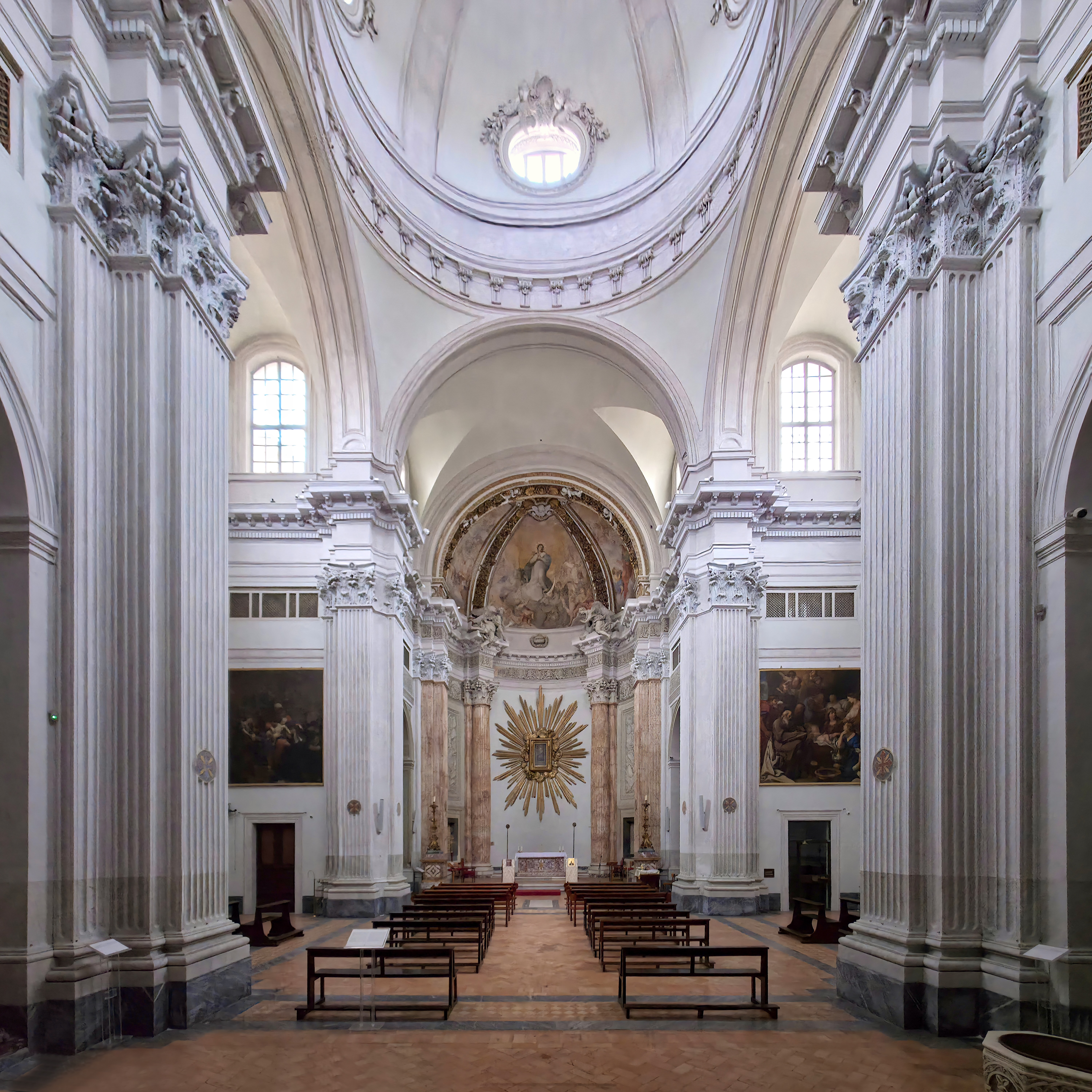
Church interior

Santa Maria della Concezione (Egyptian Arabic: كنيسه سانتا ماريا ديلا كونسيزيونى فى كامبو مارزيو) is a church in Rome, located on Piazza Campo Marzio in the Campo Marzio rione. It serves as the national church in Rome for Syriac Catholics.

== History ==
The church and its adjoining monastery traditionally originated in connection with the Iconoclastic controversy within the Byzantine Empire, when some Basilian nuns fled from Constantinople to Rome in the 8th century. They brought with them various relics, including the body of Gregory of Nazianzus, the noted 4th-century theologian and saint. They were given a home on the site now occupied by the church, where they founded a monastery with a chapel dedicated to the Virgin Mary and an oratory next to the church to contain Gregory's remains. The earliest reference to the monastery is Regestum Sublacense, a charter of 6 October 937.

Between 1562 and 1564 Abbess Chiarina Colonna (from the powerful Colonna family) built a new church dedicated to the Virgin Mary behind the ancient chapel and oratory of Saint Gregory, which made his remains more accessible to the faithful, providing more privacy to the monastic community. This had a single nave and a rectangular apse. Saint Gregory's body, however, was translated to the Basilica of St Peter in 1580.

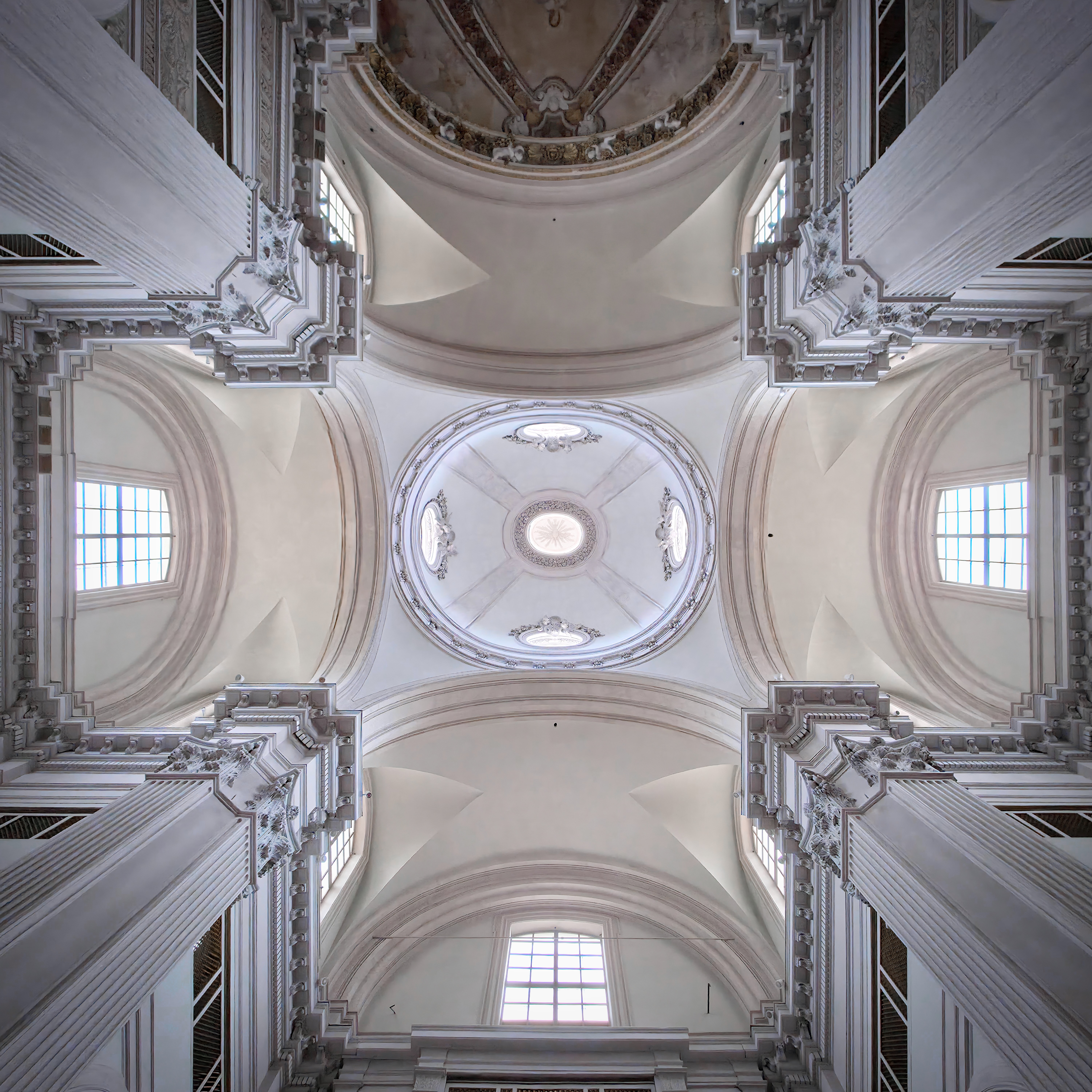
Oval dome on greek cross plan

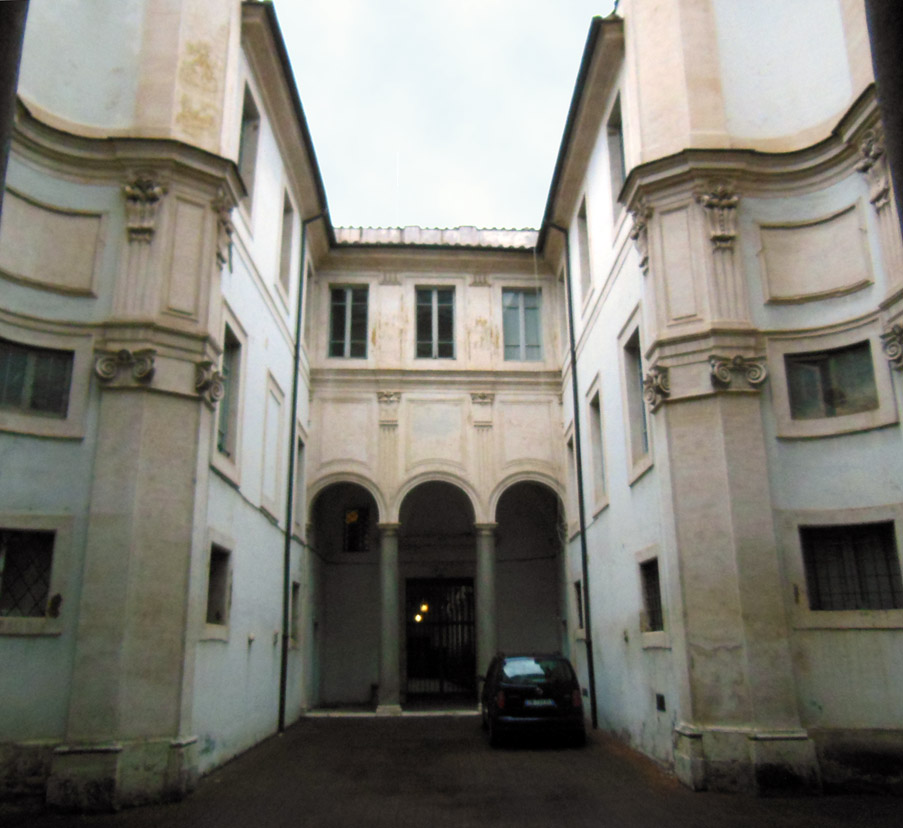
Courtyard of the church

In the 17th century the monastery was enlarged and re-ordered by Carlo Maderno and Francesco Peparelli, with work completed by 1660. The 16th century church was completely rebuilt according to the wishes of Abbess Maria Olimpia Pani, to plans by Giovanni Antonio De Rossi.

During excavations in 1777 as part of expanding the monastery, a Roman column was discovered - this was re-erected in 1856 in the Piazza di Spagna as the base for a statue of the Virgin of the Immaculate Conception, in commemoration of that belief being proclaimed a dogma by Pope Pius IX.

During the Napoleonic occupation of Rome the monastery, like other religious communities, was suppressed; the church was deconsecrated and used as a lottery office. It reopened for public worship in 1816 and now holds services according to the Syrian-Antioch rite, as the national church for Syria and the seat of the procurator to the Holy See for the Syrian Catholic Patriarchate of Antioch.

== Description ==
In front of the church's facade is the internal courtyard of the monastery, at the side of piazza Campo Marzio and entered via a three-arched portico.

== Bibliography ==
- M. Armellini, Le chiese di Roma dal secolo IV al XIX, Roma 1891, p. 334
- C. Hulsen, Le chiese di Roma nel Medio Evo, Firenze 1927, pp. 320–321
- F. Titi, Descrizione delle Pitture, Sculture e Architetture esposte in Roma, Roma 1763, p. 365
- C. Rendina, Le Chiese di Roma, Newton & Compton Editori, Milano 2000, p. 233
- M. Quercioli, Rione IV Campo Marzio, in AA.VV, I rioni di Roma, Newton & Compton Editori, Milano 2000, Vol. I, pp. 264–334
