= Repubblica – Teatro dell'Opera (Rome Metro) =

Rome metro station

Repubblica Teatro dell'Opera
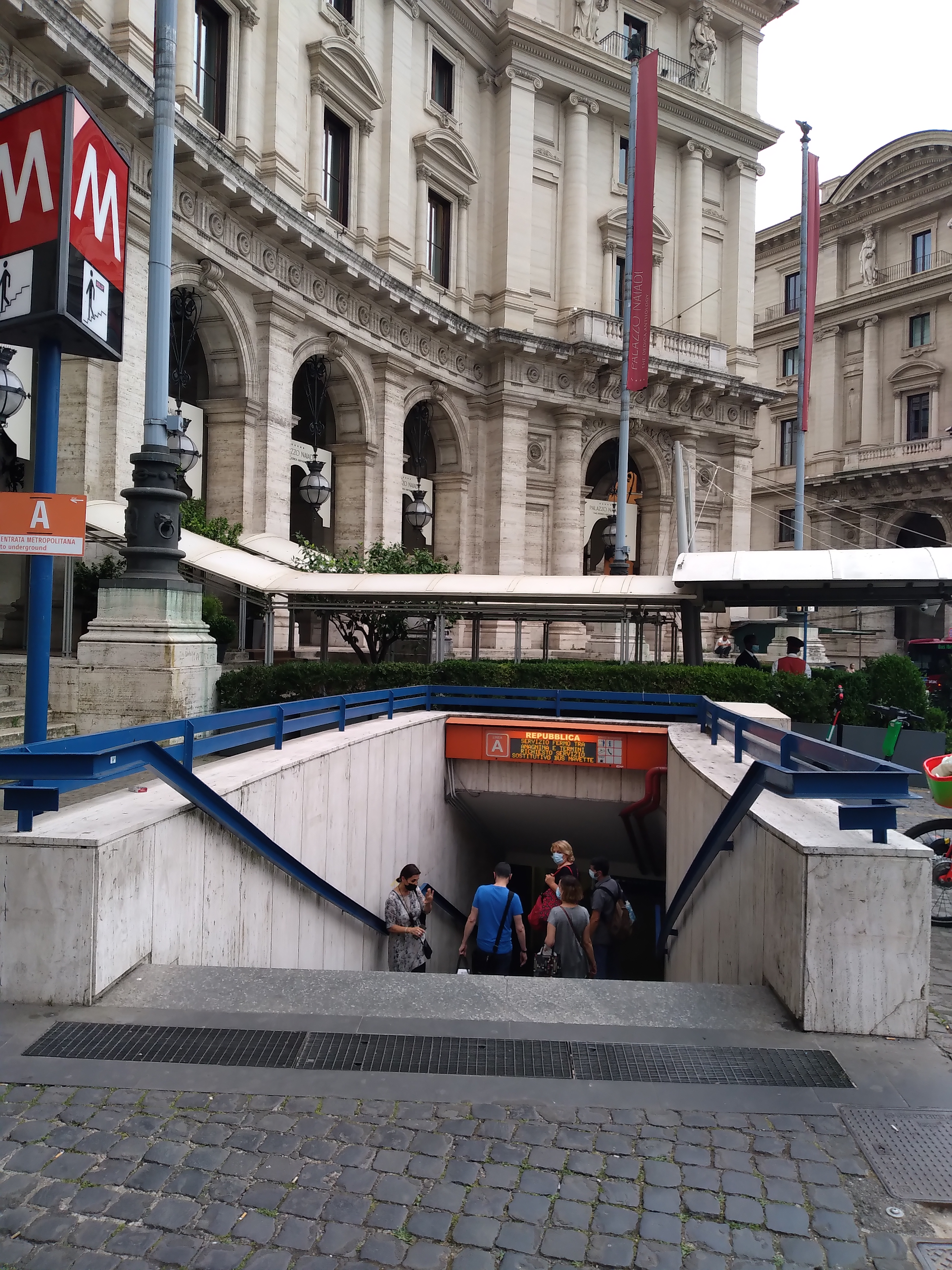
- Piazza della Repubblica entrance

General information
- Coordinates: 41°54′09″N 12°29′44″E
- Owner: ATAC
- Platforms: 1 island platform
- Tracks: 2

Construction
- Structure type: Underground

History
- Opened: 1980; 46 years ago

Services
Preceding station	Rome Metro	Following station
Barberini towards Battistini	Line A	Termini towards Anagnina
Location
- Click on the map to see marker

Repubblica–Teatro dell'Opera is an underground station on Line A of the Rome Metro. The station was inaugurated in 1980 and takes its name from the Piazza della Repubblica underneath which it lies.

== Services ==
This station has:

- Escalators

== Located nearby ==
- Piazza della Repubblica
  - Fontana delle Naiadi
  - Baths of Diocletian
  - Santa Maria degli Angeli e dei Martiri
  - National Museum of Rome
  - Temple of Minerva Medica (nymphaeum)
- Teatro Costanzi (Teatro dell'Opera)
  - National Theatre
- Via Ludovisi
  - Hotel Eden
- Via Nazionale
  - Via Quattro Fontane
  - Viminale
  - Ministry of the Interior
  - Palazzo del Viminale
- Largo Santa Susanna
  - Fontana dell'Acqua Felice o del Mosè
  - Santa Susanna
  - Santa Maria della Vittoria
    - Ecstasy of St Theresa di Bernini
  - San Bernardo alle Terme
- Via XX settembre
  - Ministry of Finance
  - Porta Pia

== Incidents ==
On 23 October 2018, 20 people, mostly fans of the Russian football team CSKA, were injured by a collapsing escalator.

The station was then closed; it reopened on June 26, 2019.
