= Column of the Immaculate Conception, Rome =

Monument in Rome depicting the Blessed Virgin Mary

Column of the Immaculate Conception
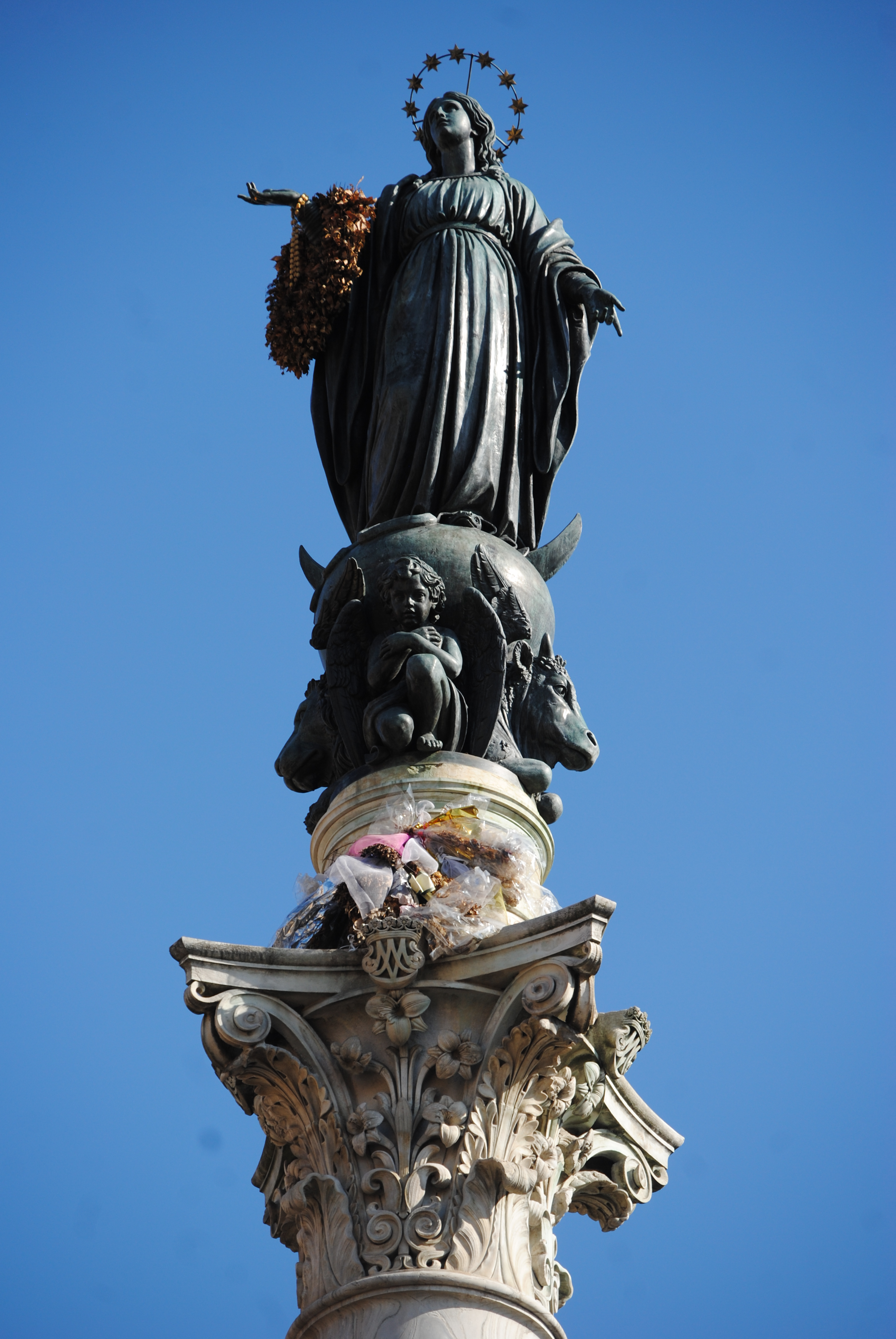
- The Virgin Mary as the Immaculate Conception carrying a wreath of flowers offered annually by the Roman firemen. Sculpture by Giuseppe Obici on top of a Corinthian column.
- Click on the map for a fullscreen view
- Coordinates: 41°54′17.94″N 12°28′58.59″E

The Column of the Immaculate Conception (Italian: La Colonna della Immacolata Concezione) is a nineteenth-century monument in central Rome depicting the Blessed Virgin Mary, located in what is called Piazza Mignanelli, towards the south east part of Piazza di Spagna. It was placed aptly in front of the offices of the Palazzo di Propaganda Fide which houses the Congregation for the Evangelization of Peoples, as well as in front of the Spanish embassy to the Holy See (which gives the name to the Piazza).

Since December 1953, Pontiffs have visited the monument annually and offered a bouquet of flowers at the base of the column with help of Roman firemen commemorating the Feast of the Immaculate Conception.

== History ==
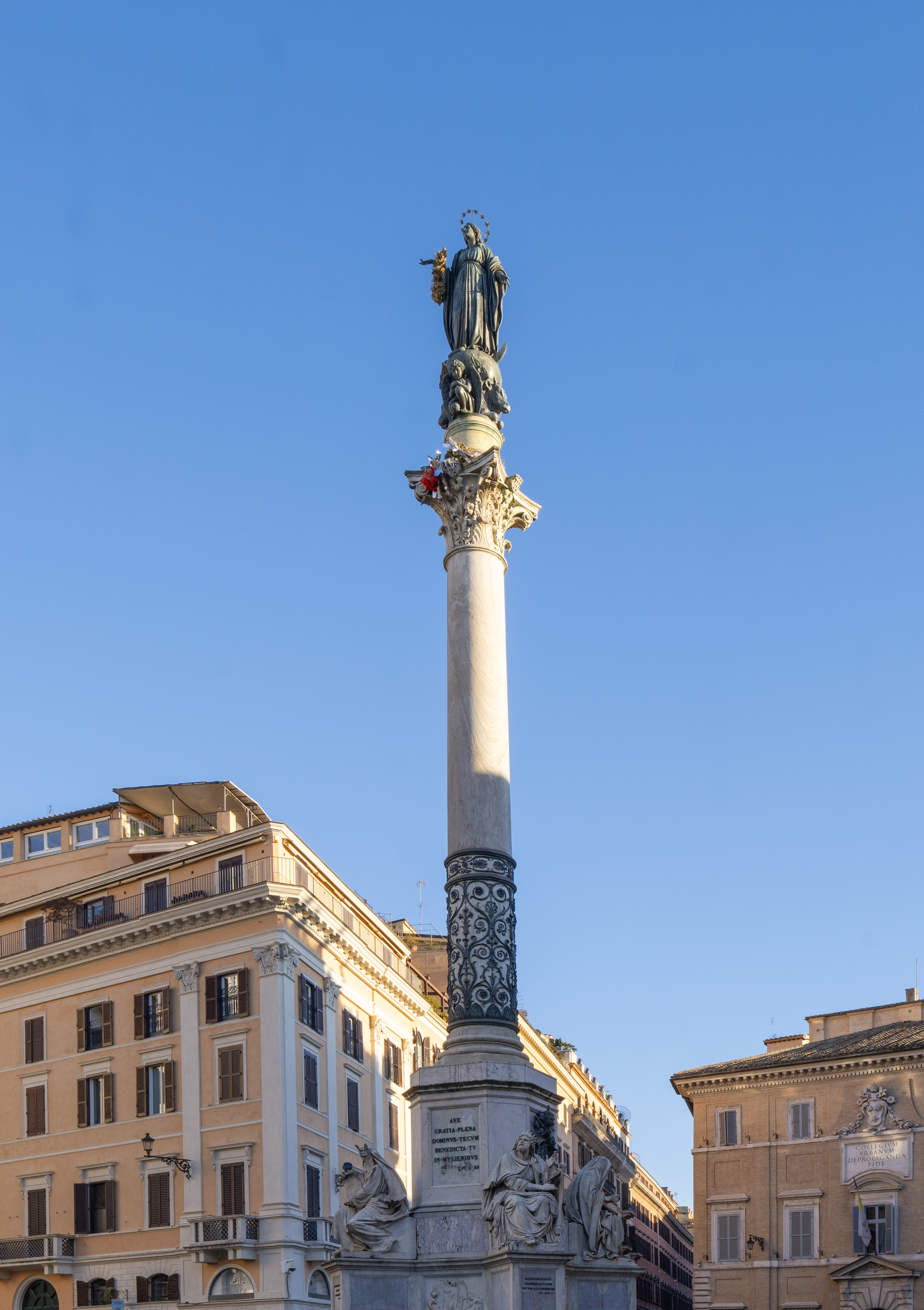
The column.

The Marian monument was designed by the architect Luigi Poletti, and commissioned by Ferdinand II, King of the Two Sicilies. In part, he wanted to put closure to the dispute between Naples and the Papal States that had developed in the last century, when Naples abolished the Chinea, a yearly tribute offered to the Pope as ultimate sovereign of Naples.

The column was dedicated on 8 December 1857, celebrating the recently adopted dogma of the Immaculate Conception of 1854. The dogma had been widely proclaimed Ex cathedra via the Papal bull Ineffabilis Deus by Pope Pius IX.

The actual structure is a square marble base with statues of biblical figures at the corners that uphold a column of Cipollino marble of 11.8 meters. Atop the column is a bronze statue of the Virgin Mary, the work of Giuseppe Obici. The standard imagery of the immaculate conception is used: a virgin on a crescent, atop the world, stomping a serpent (a symbol of the original sin assigned to all humans since Adam and Eve; except the perfected sinless Virgin Mary).

The Corinthian column itself was sculpted in ancient Rome, and was discovered on 17 September 1777 during the construction of the monastery for the Benedictine Order of Santa Maria della Concezione in Campo Marzio located in the area, the site of the former Campus Martius. Due to its incomplete construction, it had probably never been used and perhaps was in the remains of a marble workshop.

The marble base bears four bas-reliefs recalling the Annunciation, the dream of St. Joseph, the coronation of the Virgin, and the promulgation of the dogma. At the base are four statues of Hebrew figures that gave portent of the virgin birth, each accompanied by a quote of a biblical verse in Latin, including:

- King David — by Adamo Tadolini
- Isaiah the Prophet — by Salvatore Revelli
- Ezekiel the Seer — by Carlo Chelli
- Patriarch Moses — by Ignazio Jacometti

In 1922, a replica of the column was raised on the campus of University of Saint Mary of the Lake in Mundelein, Illinois, United States.

Biblical Statues located at the base of the Colonna della Immacolata

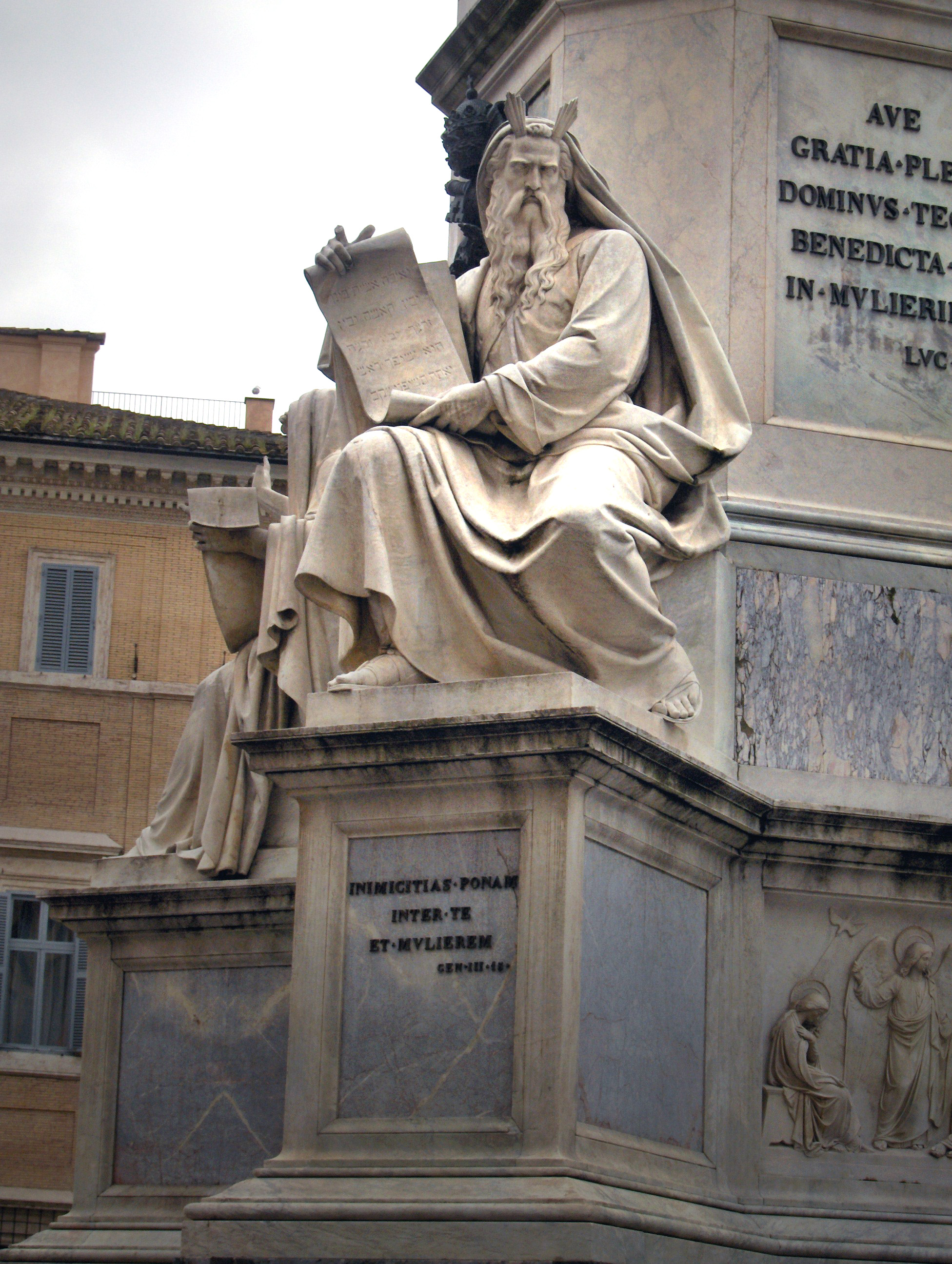
Patriarch Moses by Jacometti

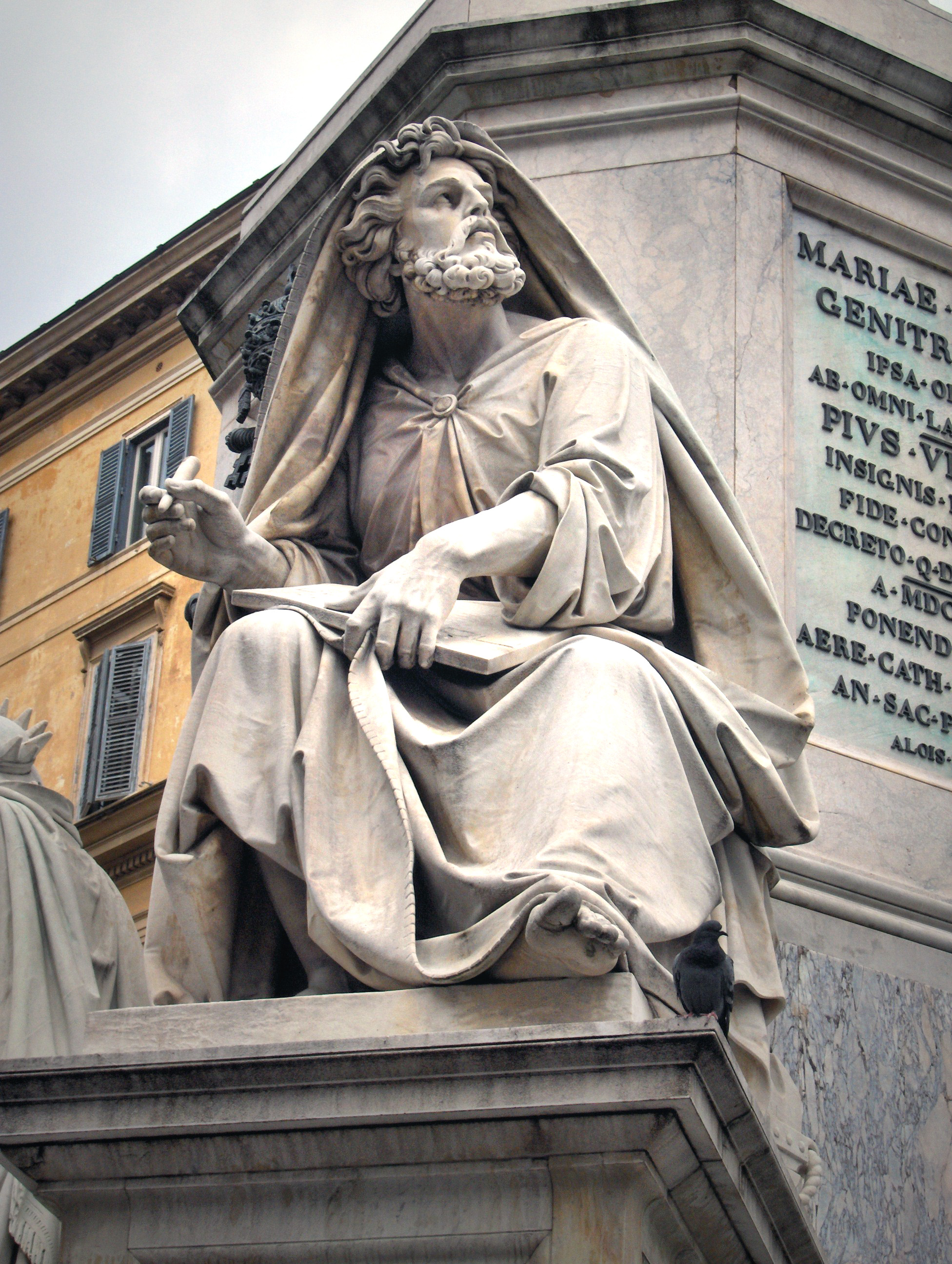
Prophet Isaiah by Revelli

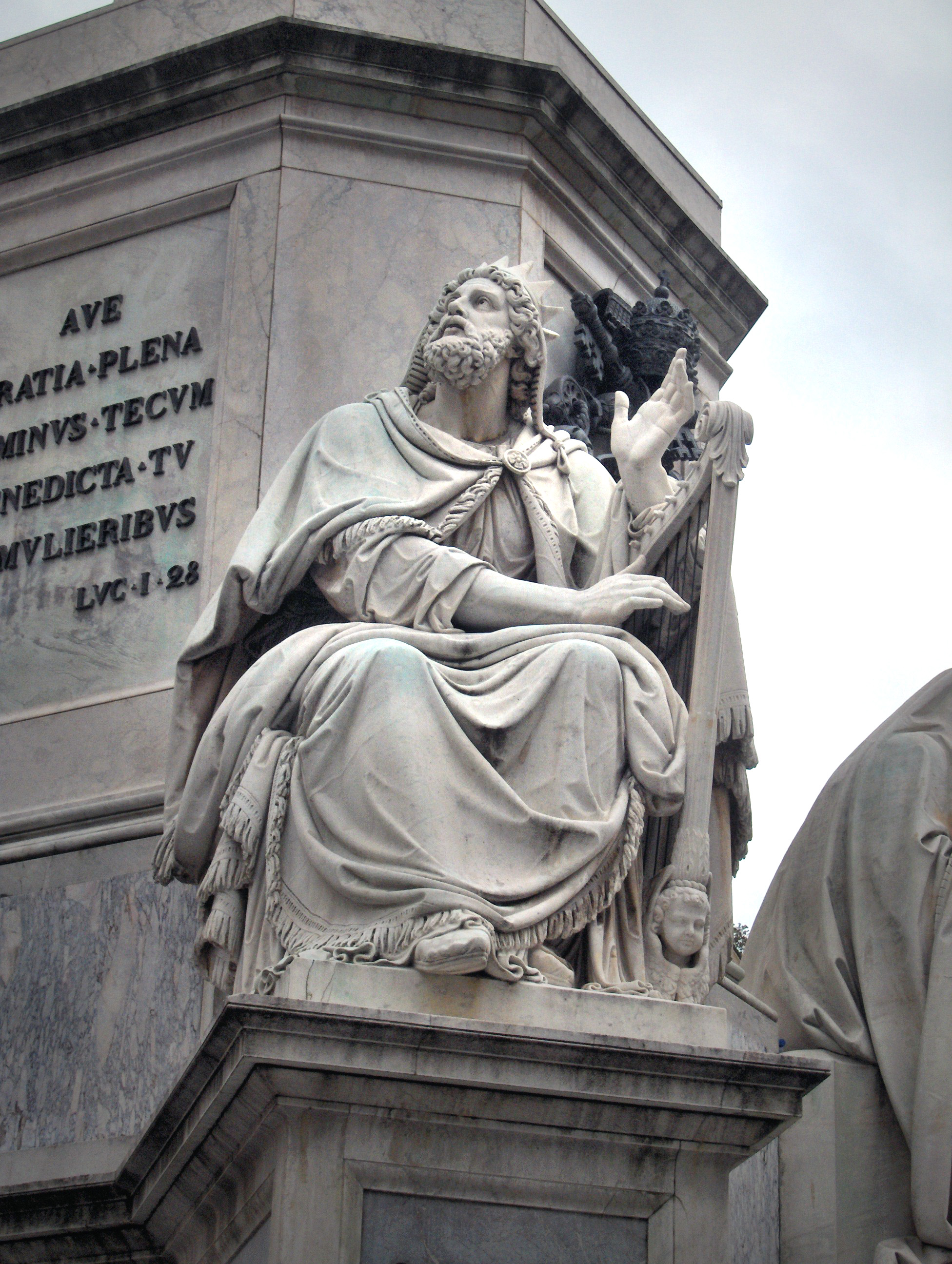
King David by Tadolini

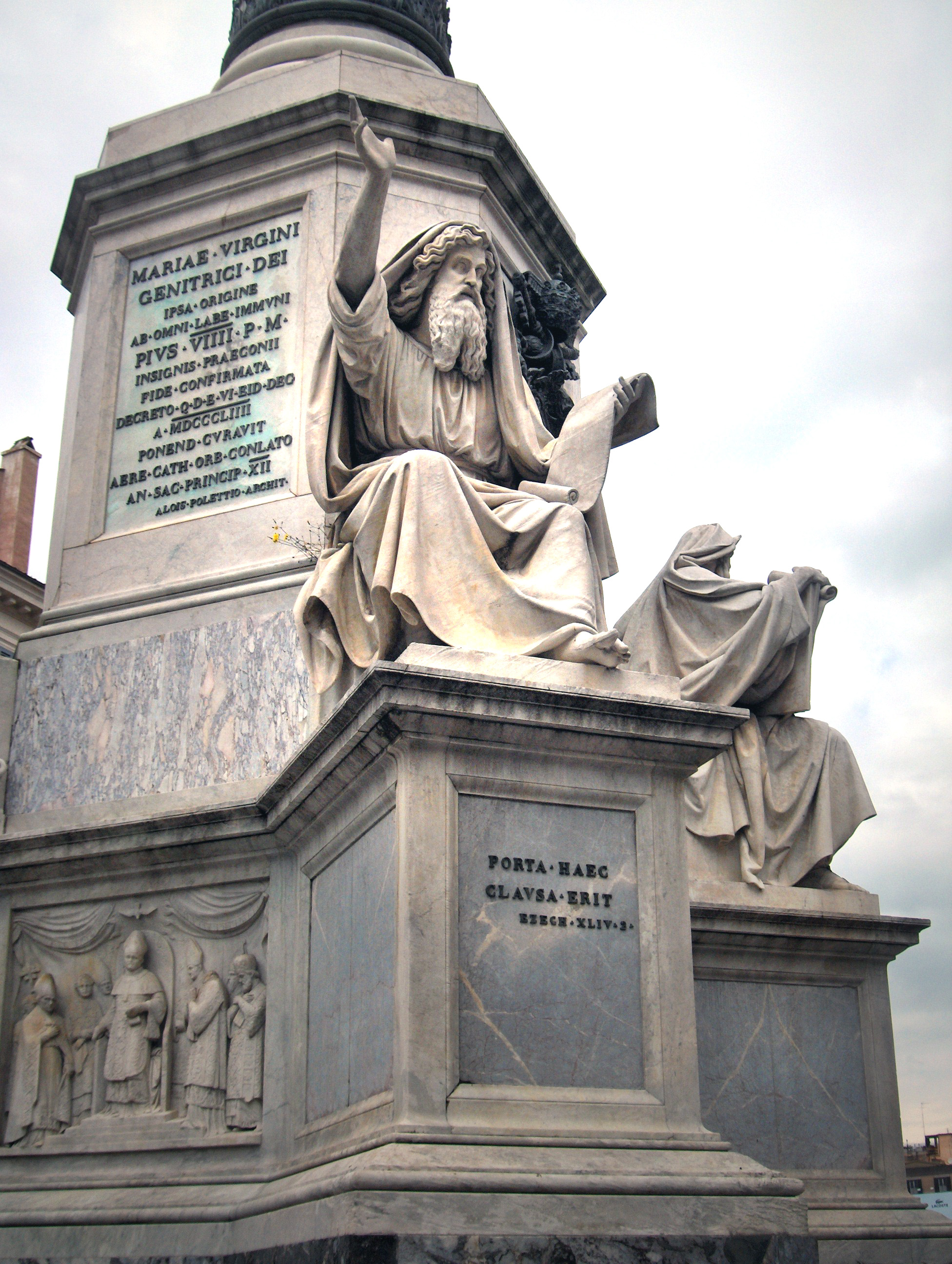
Seer Ezekiel by Carlo Chelli

== Association with Roman firemen ==
The column was erected by the city firemen. An eyewitness, Juliana Forbes writes, 'It was on its side and was raised perpendicular. It was raised by some firemen who turned some capstans and so raised it. There were sixteen men to each capstan and a great many capstans which, at the sound of a bugle, were turned round and round by the firemen.' This was on December 18.

Every December 8, the day of the Feast of the Immaculate Conception, a ceremony is held here, often with the Pope in attendance. Traditionally, the Pope places a bouquet of white roses at the base of the column and prays for her intercession to help all people in their suffering and struggles. Pope Pius XII began the tradition of sending a basket of flowers every year to be placed at the base of the column. In 1958, Pope John XXIII began actually going to the Spanish Steps to deliver the flowers himself.

The head of the Italian fire department presents a bouquet with the motto "Flammas domamus, donamus Corda" (English: "We stop fires, giving our hearts") while a fire truck is used to place a bouquet around the right arm of the Virgin Mary statue and another bouquet decorated with SPQR label is placed on the bottom of the statue. This signals the official beginning of the Christmas season in Rome and all of Italy.

== The whistle of Patriarch Moses ==
The statue of Moses was the source of a satirical joke involving the nearby statue of Pasquino, wherein the Roman statue was said to have tried to talk to the biblical statue, only to be replied with a whistle. When the Pasquino statue asked why he could not talk some mention was made to the sibilant posture of the statue's lips.

== Sources ==
- Translated from entry in Italian Wikipedia
- Romeartlover website

Preceded by Torre dei Capocci	Landmarks of Rome; Column of the Immaculate Conception, Rome	Succeeded by Torre dei Conti
