= Capocci =

Italian baronial family

- Country: Papal States
- Founded: 11th century
- Titles: Lord of Monterotondo; Lord of Mentana; Lord of Montecelio; Lord of Sant'Angelo Romano
- Dissolution: 17th century

The Capocci family was an Italian baronial family perhaps originally from Viterbo, who played a significant part in the affairs of the city, especially between the 12th and 14th centuries.

== History ==
The first news of the family, which perhaps initially took the surname of Gasperini, date back to the second half of the 11th century.

Several members of the family have held illustrious positions, in particular Pietro and Nicola Capocci, who occupied the position of Cardinals. The family that in its period of maximum power enjoyed the possession of important fiefdoms including Monterotondo, Mentana, Montecelio and Sant'Angelo Romano, all in the region of present day Lazio. The Capocci lost their importance in the following centuries and became extinct in the 17th century.

While the patriarchs of the family became extinct, there are many branches that survived. The 17th century extinction is simply an observation that no records connect that period with 18th and 19th century family heritage.

== People ==
- Ernesto Capocci (1798–1864), Italian mathematician, astronomer and politician
- Filippo Capocci (1840–1911), Italian organist and composer
- Gaetano Capocci (1811–1898), Italian composer, organist and maestro
- Niccolò Capocci (died 1368), Italian cardinal
- Oreste Capocci (1888–1950), French trade unionist
- Pietro Capocci (c.1200–1259), Italian cardinal
- Raniero Capocci (c. 1180–1190 – 1250), Italian cardinal and military leader
