= Palazzo di Propaganda Fide =

Coordinates: 41°54′14.6″N 12°29′1.6″E

- Palace of the Propagation of the Faith
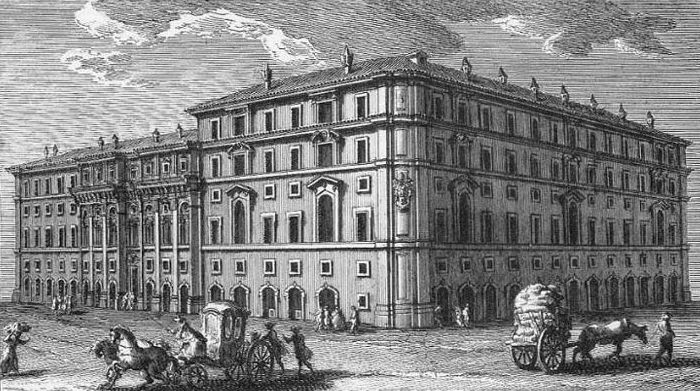
- The Palazzo di Propaganda Fide on an engraving by Giuseppe Vasi
- Interactive map of the Palazzo di Propaganda Fide area

General information
- Location: Rome, Italy

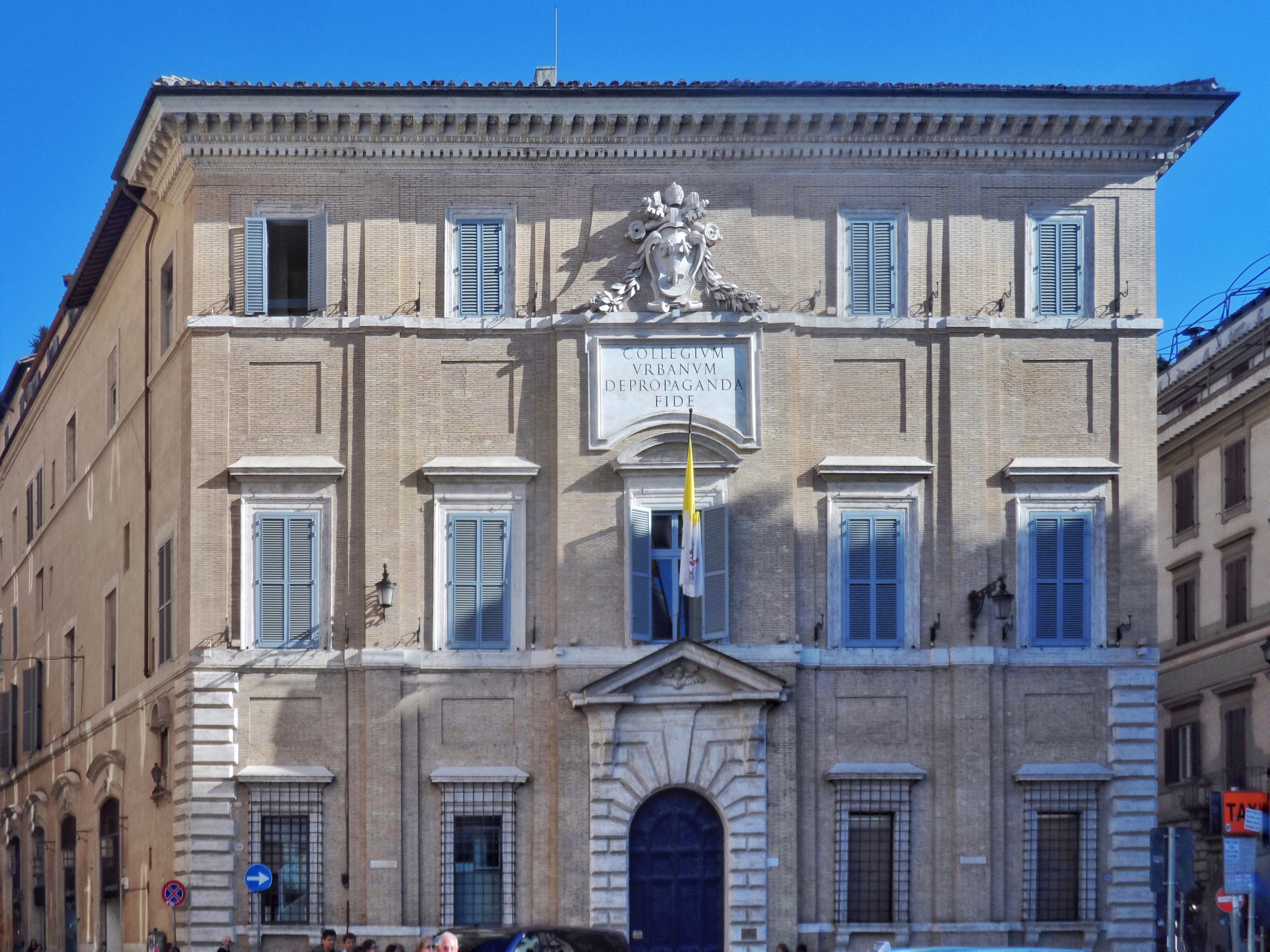
The Palazzo today

The Palazzo di Propaganda Fide (in English: Palace of the Propagation of the Faith) is a palace located in Rome, designed by Gian Lorenzo Bernini, then Francesco Borromini. Since 1626, it has housed the Congregation for the Evangelization of Peoples and since 1929 is an extraterritorial property of the Holy See. The complex includes a dormitory and chapel as well.

== History ==
The building is located in the Rione Colonna, at the southern end of piazza di Spagna. Its southern facade is in front of the basilica Sant'Andrea delle Fratte, whose cupola and the bell were the work of Borromini. The main facade was created by Bernini (1644), and the front side of the via di Propaganda by Borromini (1646). This setting aside of Bernini's work was a request of Pope Innocent X, who preferred Borromini's style. The work was completed in 1667.

The palace is still devoted to its original purpose, but the ground floor has been converted to shops. The building houses the Museo Missionario di Propaganda Fide, highlighting 400 years of missionary work.

== Description ==
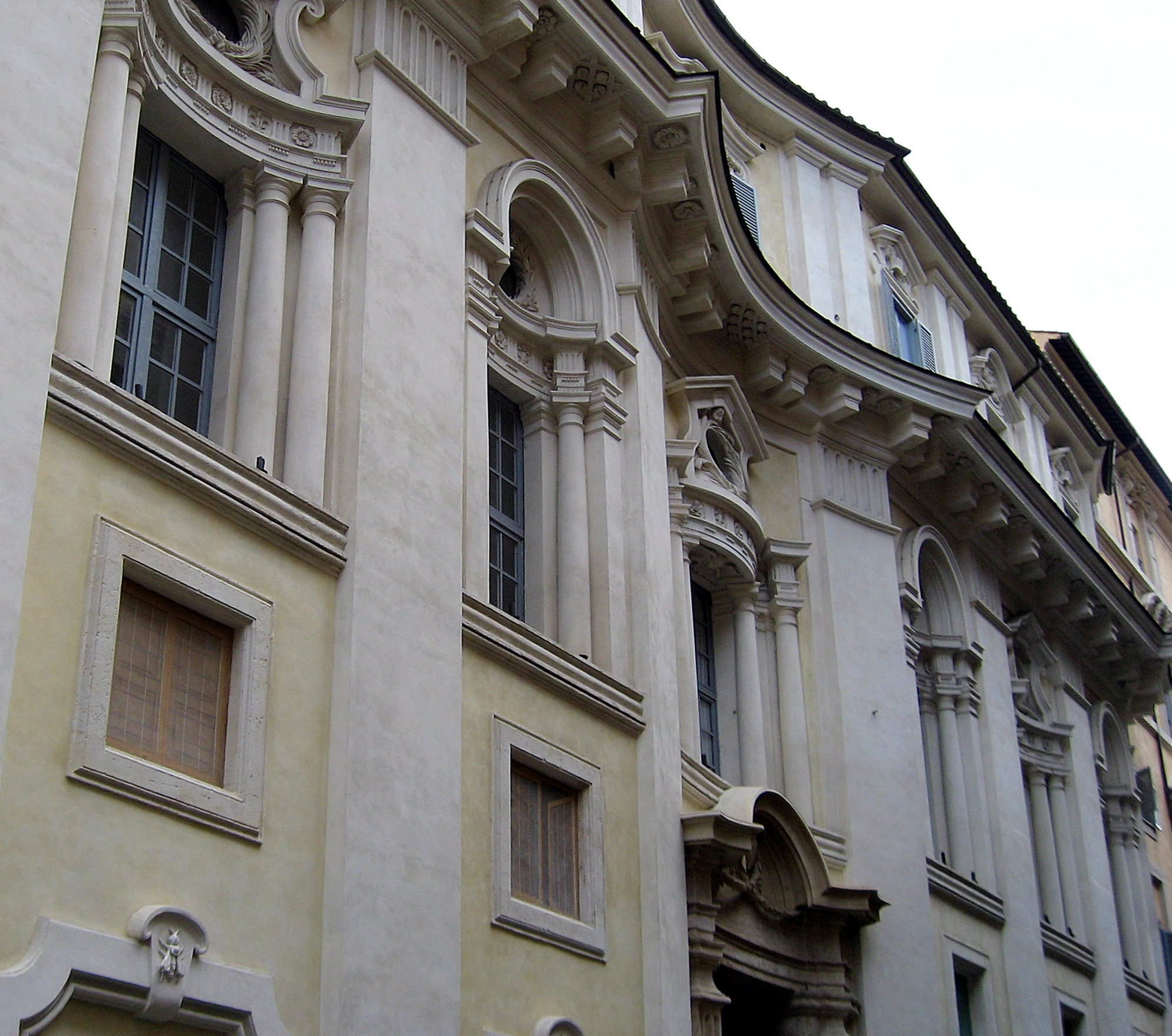
The facade made by Borromini

The facade over the Piazza di Spagna is by Bernini. A plaque above the doorway displays the coat of arms of Urban VIII, with Barberini bees, Papal tiara and keys.

The façade facing via di Propaganda, that Borromini completed in 1662 is a masterpiece of Baroque architecture. Composed of pilasters, and alternating concave and convex curves in the windows design, it is one of the most famous examples of Italian Baroque architecture.

His first designs for the façade on the Via di Propaganda Fide had five bays but he expanded this to seven. The central bay is a concave curve and accommodates the main entry into the college courtyard and complex, with the entrance to the chapel to the left and to the college to the right. The façade is dominated by the giant pilasters that originally supported a balustrade above the narrow entablature but later extensions obliterated the balustrade. The central bay of the façade is a concave curve with angled pilasters at its edges, perhaps in recognition that this façade would always be seen at an oblique angle because of the narrowness of the street. On the outside, a ridge marks the separation between the ground floor and piano nobile.

=== Interior ===
On the interior, the wall and the vault are differentiated horizontally by a cornice line but there is a vertical continuity of wall and vault which allows for windows at the base of the vault.

The ceiling of Bernini‘s wooden library is decorated with the Barberini bee.

In 1666, Borromini constructed the “Oratorio dei Re Magi” or chapel of the Magi kings, after demolishing the small elliptical church that had been constructed by Bernini. Initially Borromini designed an elongated oval chapel plan but this was superseded by a rectilinear design, with the greater length parallel to the street, and with curved corners on the interior. Construction of the chapel commenced in 1660 and although the main part was built by 1665, some of the decoration was carried out after his death.

== See also ==
- List of works by Gian Lorenzo Bernini
- Column of the Immaculate Conception, Rome
