= Piazza di Spagna =

Square in Rome, Italy

- City square
- {{{other_names}}}
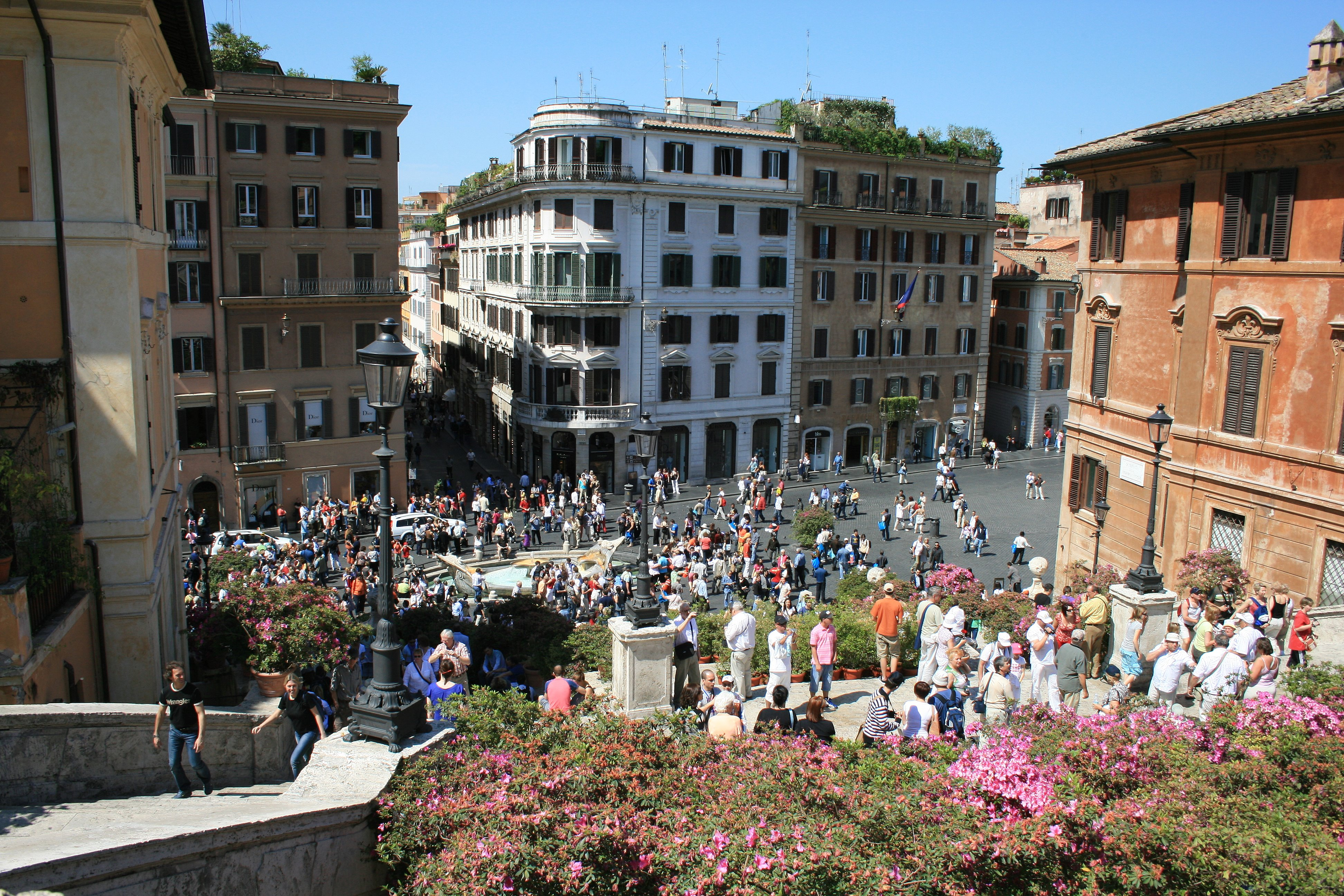
- Piazza di Spagna viewed from the Spanish Steps
- Location: Rome, Italy
- Interactive map of Piazza di Spagna
- Coordinates: 41°54′22″N 12°28′56″E

The Piazza di Spagna is a square in the centre of Rome, the capital of Italy. It lies at the foot of the Spanish Steps and owes its name to the Palazzo di Spagna, the seat of the Embassy of Spain to the Holy See. The Column of the Immaculate Conception is in the square.

== The square ==
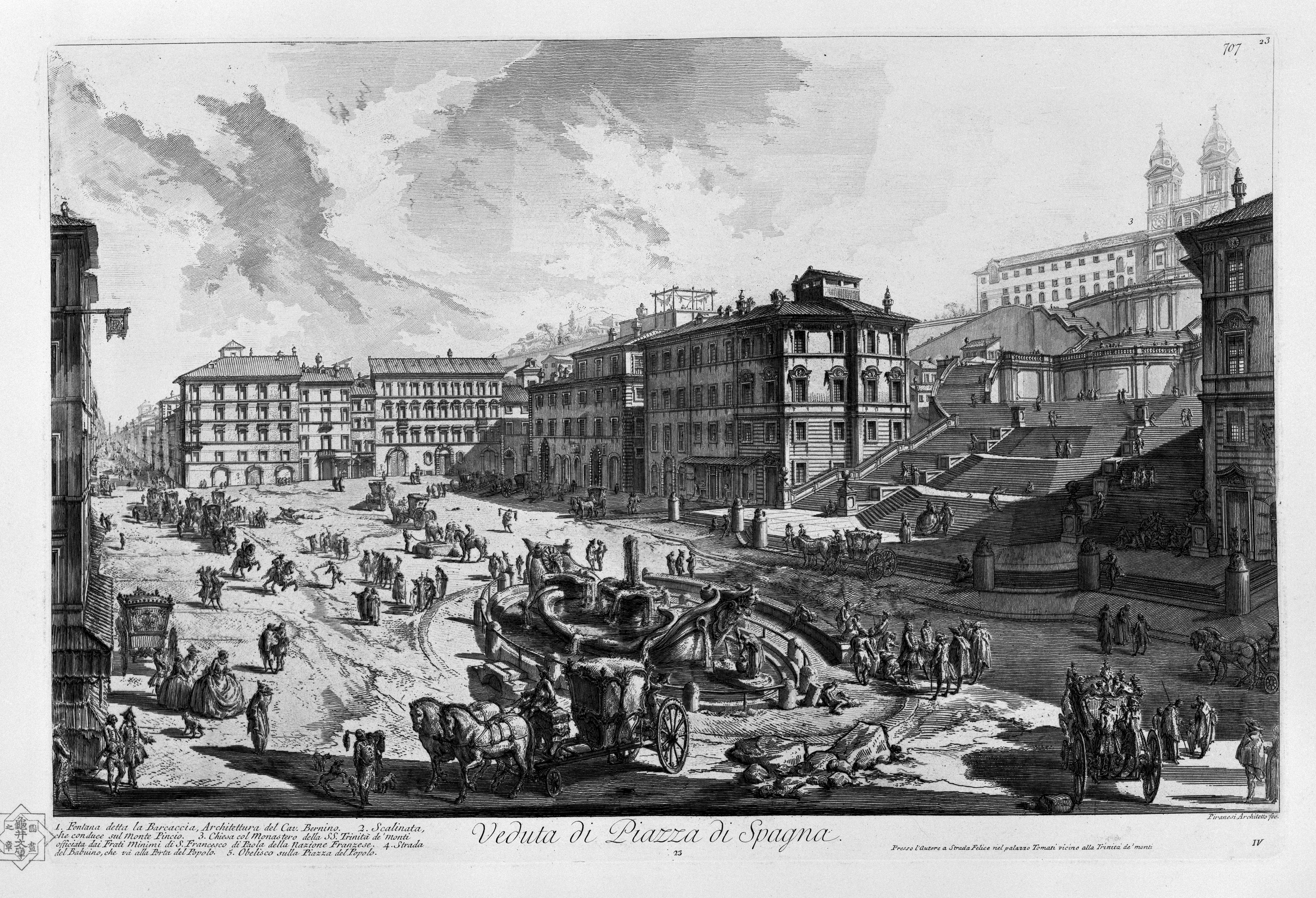
Piazza di Spagna and Via Condotti in an engraving by Giovanni Battista Piranesi

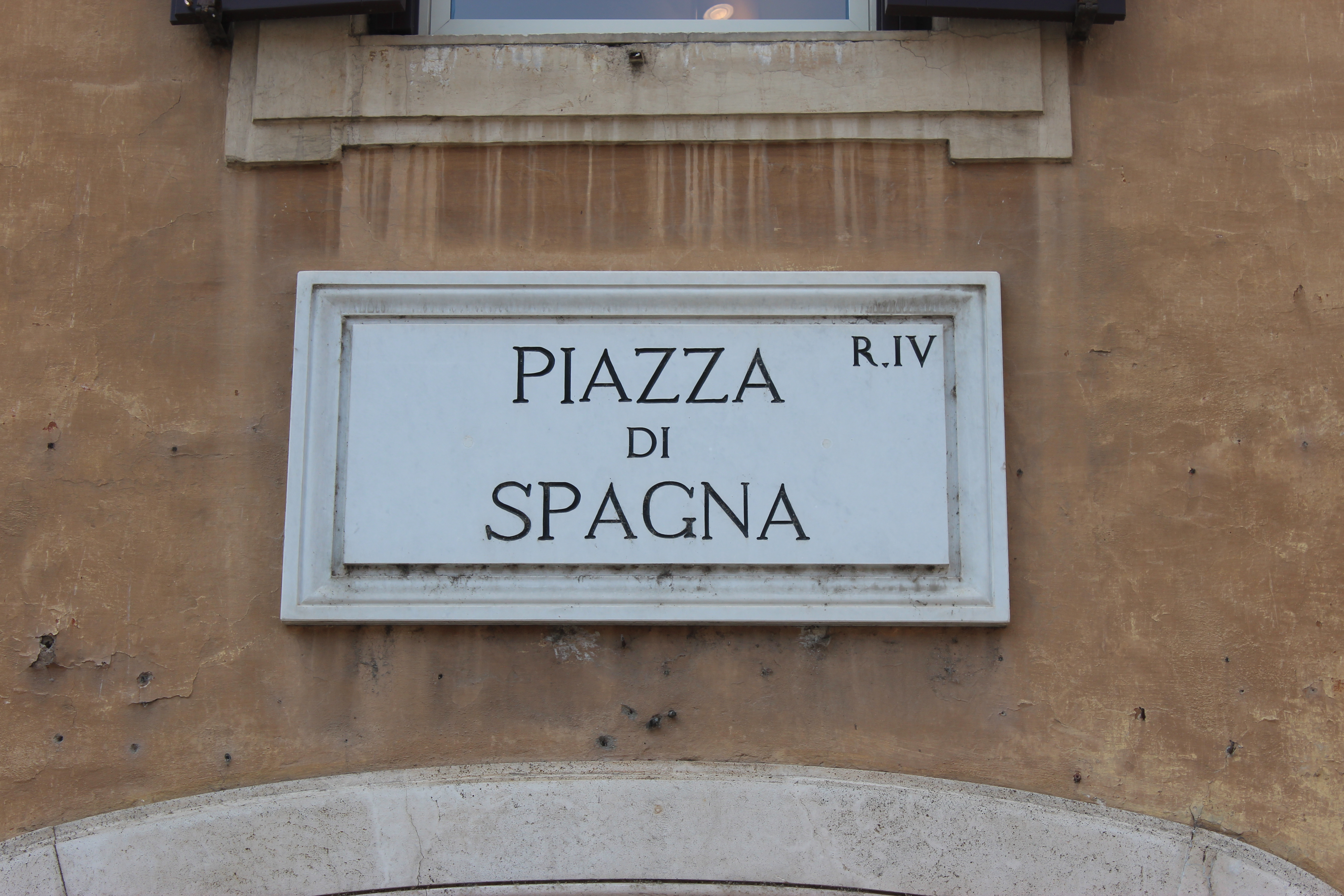
Sign in Piazza di Spagna

In the middle of the square is the Fontana della Barcaccia, dating to the beginning of the Baroque period, sculpted by Pietro Bernini and his son Gian Lorenzo Bernini.

At the right corner of the Spanish Steps rises the house of the English poet John Keats, who lived there until his death in 1821: it is now a museum dedicated to him and his friend Percy Bysshe Shelley, displaying books and memorabilia of English romanticism. At the left corner, there is the Babington's tea room, founded in 1893.

The side near Via Frattina is overlooked by the two façades (the main one, designed by Gian Lorenzo Bernini, and the side one created by Francesco Borromini) of the Palazzo di Propaganda Fide, a property of the Holy See. In front of it, actually in a part of Piazza di Spagna named Piazza Mignanelli, rises the Column of the Immaculate Conception, erected in 1856, two years after the proclamation of the dogma.

The streets connecting to the square are known for their luxury shopping stores.

Since the 1980 the piazza accommodates a station on Line A of the Rome Metro, called Spagna..

== Monuments and places of interest ==
=== Palazzi ===
- Palazzo di Propaganda Fide
- Palazzo di Spagna, seat of the Spanish embassy to the Holy See

=== Monuments and museums ===
- Trinità dei Monti
- Keats-Shelley Memorial House
- Giorgio De Chirico House
- Column of the Immaculate Conception
- Fountain of the Babuino
- Spanish Steps
- Fontana della Barcaccia

=== Schools ===
- Collegio San Giuseppe - Istituto De Merode

=== Other ===
- Babington's tea room
- Spagna (Rome Metro)

Preceded by Piazza Navona	Landmarks of Rome; Piazza di Spagna	Succeeded by Piazza Venezia
