= List of Rome Metro stations =

As of May 2018, the Rome Metro comprises three lines – A, B, and C – which together serve a total of 74 stations (counting Termini, the interchange station between Lines A and B, San Giovanni, the interchange station between Lines A and C, and Colosseo, the interchange station between Lines B and C, only once) as listed below.

== Line A (orange) ==

Line A serves a total of 27 stations (including one interchange with Line B and another with Line C), most of which opened in 1980 (five stations opened in 1999 and 2000):

Station Name	Opened	Transfer
Battistini	2000	
Cornelia	2000	
Baldo degli Ubaldi	2000	
Valle Aurelia	1999	FL3 (Lazio regional railways)
Cipro	1999	
Ottaviano – San Pietro – Musei Vaticani	1980	19
Lepanto	1980	19
Flaminio - Piazza del Popolo	1980	2 RM-VT
Spagna	1980	
Barberini – Fontana di Trevi	1980	
Repubblica - Teatro dell'Opera	1980	
Termini	1980	5 14 LE
Vittorio Emanuele	1980	5 14
Manzoni – Museo della Liberazione	1980	
San Giovanni	2018	3
Re di Roma	1980	
Ponte Lungo	1980	FL1 FL3 FL5
Furio Camillo	1980	
Colli Albani	1980	
Arco di Travertino	1980	
Porta Furba - Quadraro	1980	
Numidio Quadrato	1980	
Lucio Sestio	1980	
Giulio Agricola	1980	
Subaugusta	1980	
Cinecittà	1980	
Anagnina	1980	

== Line B (blue) ==

Line B serves a total of 26 stations (including one interchange with Line A and another with Line C), on two branch lines (with 15 stations on the common section of both branch lines):

East branch
Station Name	Opened	Transfer
Rebibbia	1990	
Ponte Mammolo	1990	
Santa Maria del Soccorso	1990	
Pietralata	1990	
Monti Tiburtini	1990	
Quintiliani	2003	
Tiburtina	1990	FL1 FL2 FL3

Northeast branch (B1)
Station Name	Opened	Transfer
Jonio	2015	
Conca d'Oro	2012	
Libia	2012	FL1
Sant'Agnese - Annibaliano	2012	

Common part
Station Name	Opened	Transfer
Bologna	1990	
Policlinico	1990	3 19
Castro Pretorio	1990	
Termini	1955	5 14
Cavour	1955	
Colosseo	1955	3
Circo Massimo	1955	3
Piramide	1955	3
Garbatella	1990	
Basilica S. Paolo	1955	Rome–Lido railway
Marconi	1990	
EUR Magliana	1955	Rome–Lido railway
EUR Palasport	1955	
EUR Fermi	1955	
Laurentina	1955	

== Line C (green) ==

Line C serves a total of 24 stations (including one interchange with Line A and one interchange with Line B), all of which opened in 2014, 2015, 2018 and 2025.

Station Name	Opened	Transfer
Colosseo	2025	3
Porta Metronia	2025	
San Giovanni	2018	3
Lodi	2015	
Pigneto	2015	Rome–Giardinetti railway
Malatesta	2015	
Teano	2015	
Gardenie	2015	5 19
Mirti	2015	5 19
Parco di Centocelle	2014	Rome–Giardinetti railway
Alessandrino	2014	
Torre Spaccata	2014	
Torre Maura	2014	
Giardinetti	2014	
Torrenova	2014	
Torre Angela	2014	
Torre Gaia	2014	
Grotte Celoni	2014	
Due Leoni-Fontana Candida	2014	
Borghesiana	2014	
Bolognetta	2014	
Finocchio	2014	
Graniti	2014	
Monte Compatri-Pantano	2014	
