= Parco di Centocelle (Rome Metro) =

Rome metro station

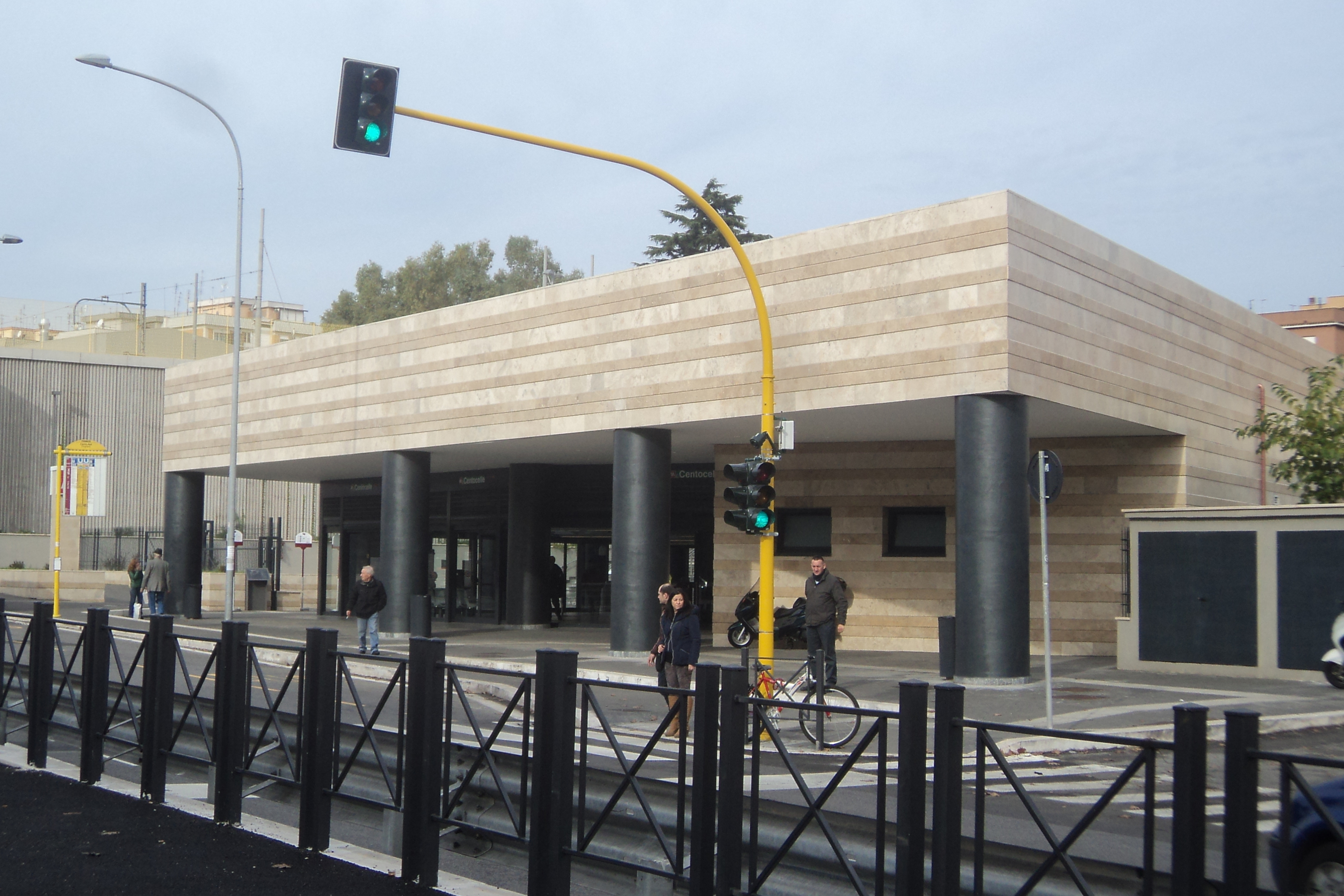

General information
- Coordinates: 41°52′29″N 12°34′05″E
- Owner: ATAC

Construction
- Structure type: Underground

History
- Opened: 9 November 2014; 12 years ago

Services
Preceding station	Rome Metro	Following station
Mirti towards Colosseo	Line C	Alessandrino towards Monte Compatri-Pantano
Location
- Click on the map to see marker

Parco di Centocelle is an underground station of Line C of the Rome Metro. It is located near the intersection between the Via Casilina and Via Palmiro Togliatti. It is the last station of Line C following the route of the former Rome–Giardinetti railway. Parco di Centocelle serves as an important interchange between the public transportation corridors of Via Casilina and Via Togliatti.

Construction of the station started in 2007, and it was opened on 9 November 2014. It is located near the Centocelle Archaeological Park.

It served as a temporary western terminus of Line C until the opening of Lodi station in June 2015.
