= Torre Spaccata (Rome Metro) =

Rome metro station

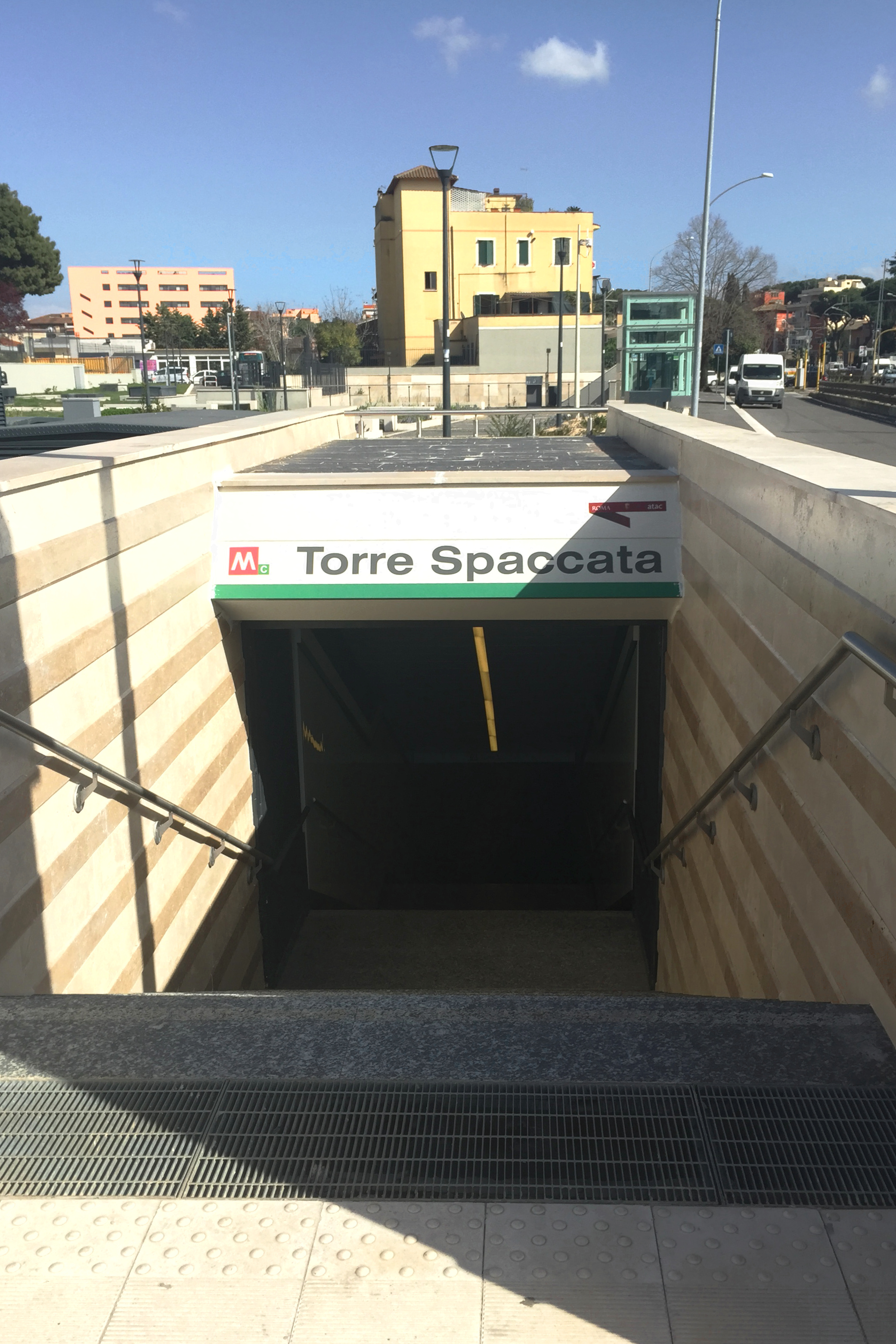

General information
- Coordinates: 41°52′08″N 12°35′12″E
- Owner: ATAC

Construction
- Structure type: Underground

History
- Opened: 9 November 2014; 12 years ago

Services
Preceding station	Rome Metro	Following station
Alessandrino towards Colosseo	Line C	Torre Maura towards Monte Compatri-Pantano
Location
- Click on the map to see marker

Torre Spaccata is an underground station of Line C of the Rome Metro. It is located at the intersection of the Via Casilina with Via di Torre Spaccata and Via di Tor Tre Teste. The stop serves the areas of Torre Spaccata, Alessandrino and Tor Tre Teste. Construction of the station started in 2007, and it was opened on 9 November 2014.
