= Alessandrino (Rome Metro) =

Rome metro station

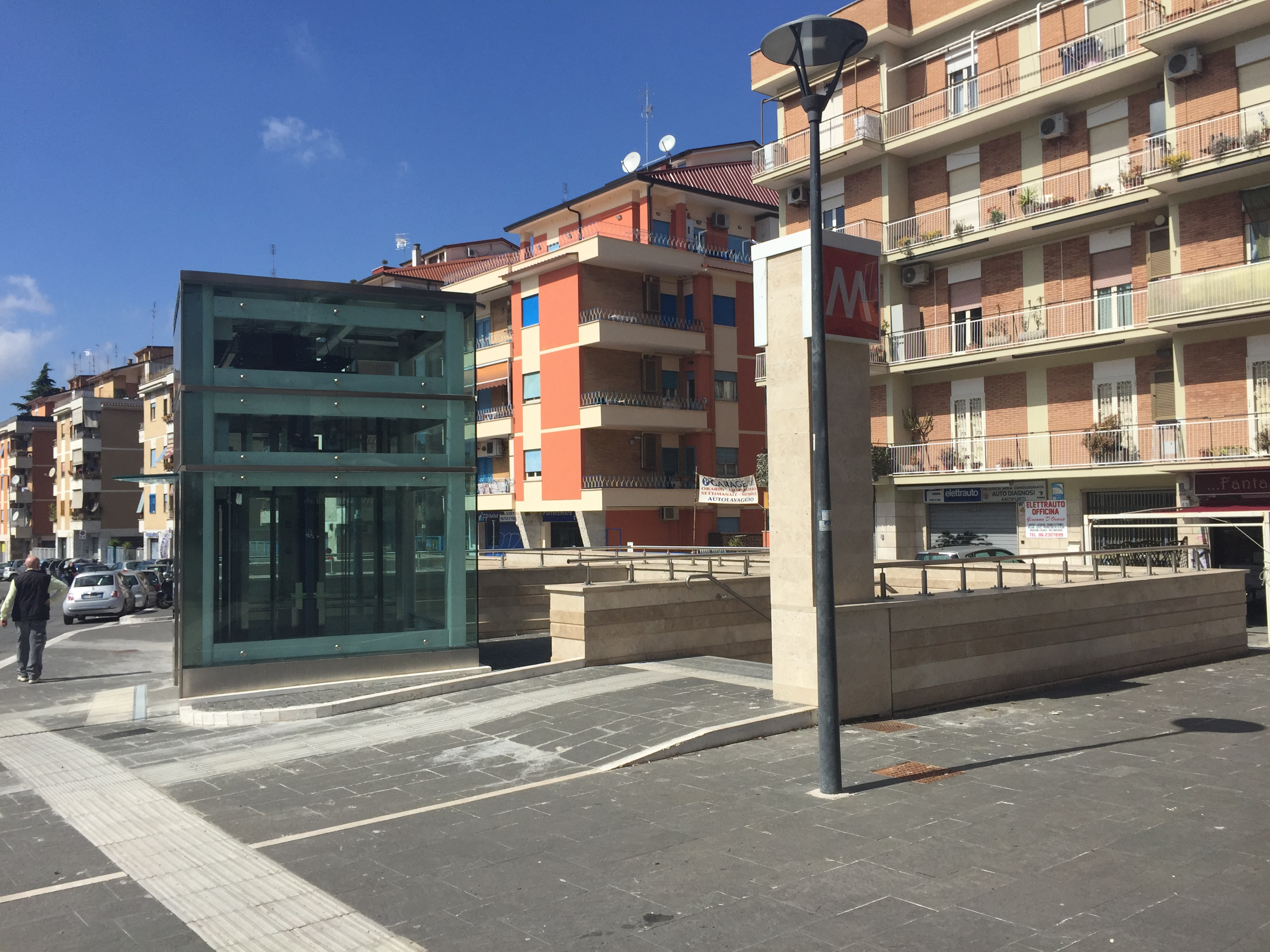

General information
- Coordinates: 41°52′17″N 12°34′43″E
- Owner: ATAC

Construction
- Structure type: Underground

History
- Opened: 9 November 2014; 12 years ago

Services
Preceding station	Rome Metro	Following station
Parco di Centocelle towards Colosseo	Line C	Torre Spaccata towards Monte Compatri-Pantano
Location
- Click on the map to see marker

Alessandrino is an underground station of Line C of the Rome Metro. It is located along the Via Casilina, at the intersection with Viale Alessandrino and Piazza Sor Capanna, between the Don Bosco and Alessandrino districts.

Construction of the station began in 2007, and the stop itself was opened on 9 November 2014.

== Connections ==
Bus connections include the 213, 313, and 552 buses.

== Nearby amenities ==
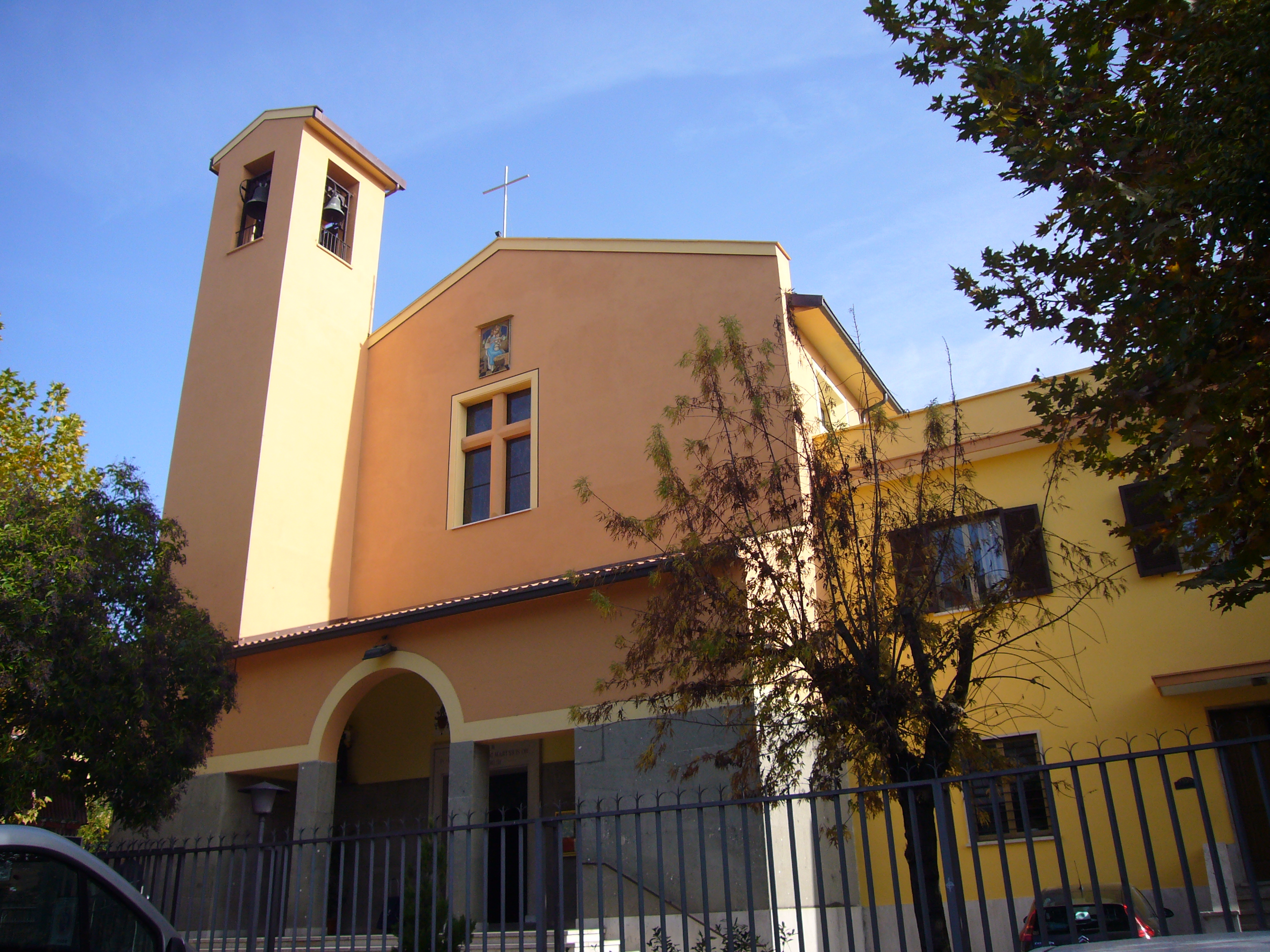
Facade of the church of San Giustino in Alessandrino

The station is in walking distance from many cafes, restaurants, and shops. Primarily a "suburban" residential area, the main site is a five minute walk away, the parish and theatre of San Giustino, which is named for Justin Martyr. It was "protected" by Cardinal Phạm Minh Mẫn, an archbishop emeritus from Vietnam, until his death on 22 March 2026.

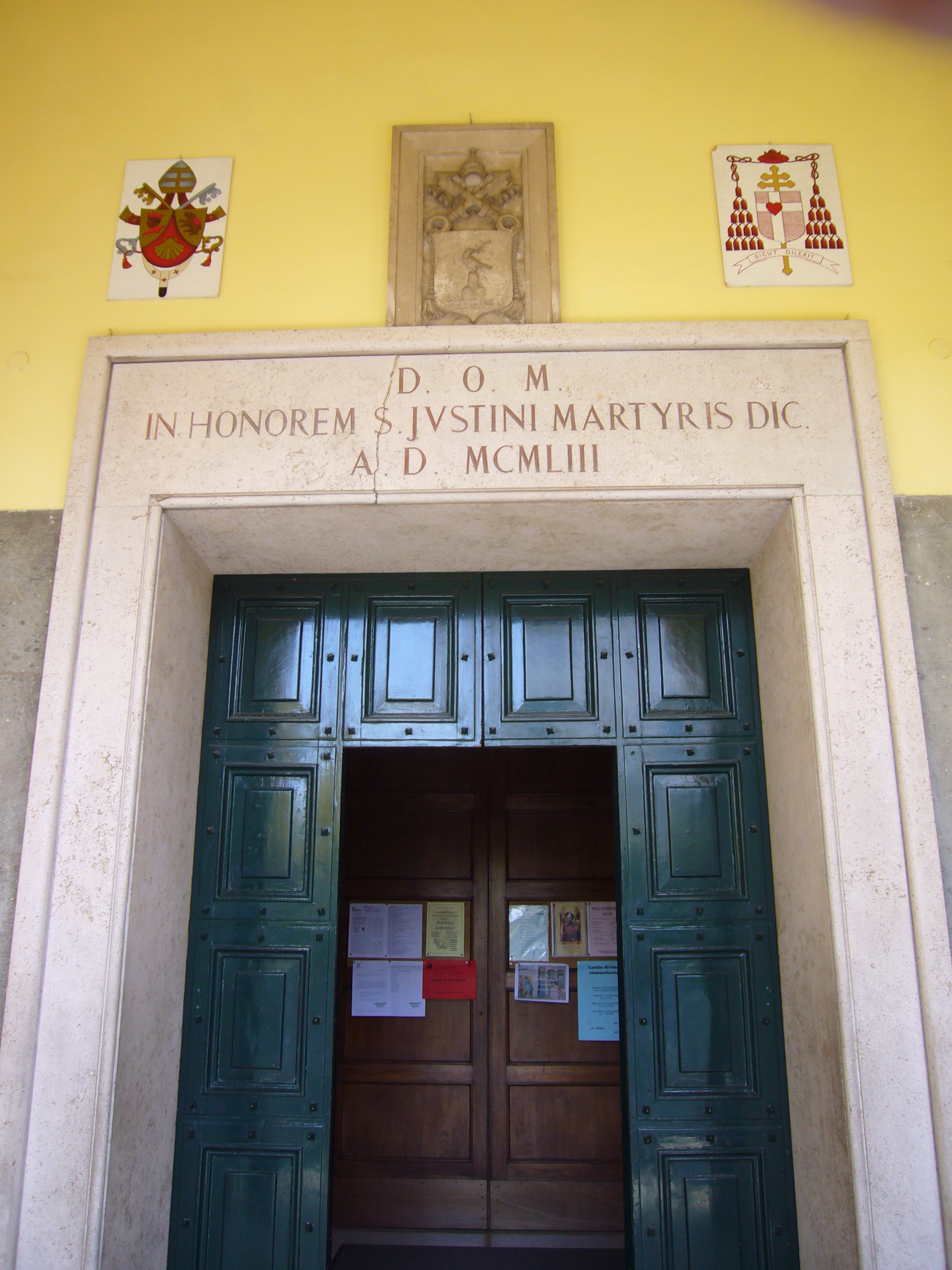
The church of San Giustino, Rome displayed the arms of its titular cardinal, Jean-Baptiste Phạm Minh Mẫn, who died on 22 March 2026, at upper right.
