= Torre Angela (Rome Metro) =

Rome metro station

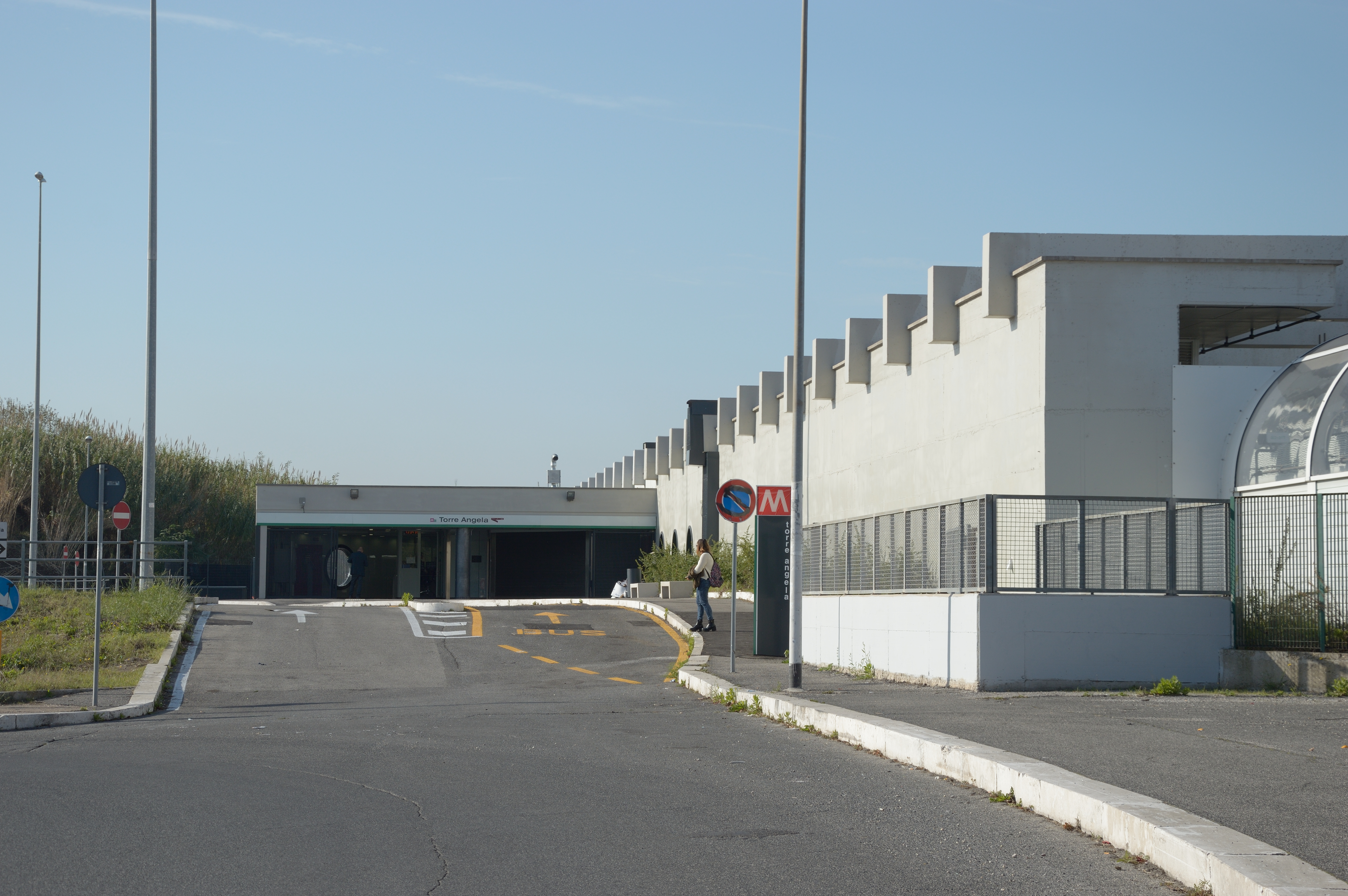

General information
- Coordinates: 41°51′52″N 12°37′33″E
- Owner: ATAC

Construction
- Structure type: at-grade

History
- Opened: 9 November 2014; 12 years ago

Services
Preceding station	Rome Metro	Following station
Torrenova towards Colosseo	Line C	Torre Gaia towards Monte Compatri-Pantano
Location
- Click on the map to see marker

Torre Angela is a station of Line C of the Rome Metro. It is located near Via Casilina, at the intersection of Viale Duilio Cambellotti and Largo Ettore Paratore. The station serves the Roman quarters Torre Angela, Tor Vergata and Tor Bella Monaca. The previous train station of the Rome–Pantano railway line closed in 2008 in order to be transformed into the current metro station. It was re-opened on 9 November 2014.

== Nearby amenities ==
The station is in walking distance from many cafes, restaurants, bars, and shops. Primarily a "suburban" residential area, which includes Romanian immigrants.
