= Torre Maura (Rome Metro) =

Rome metro station

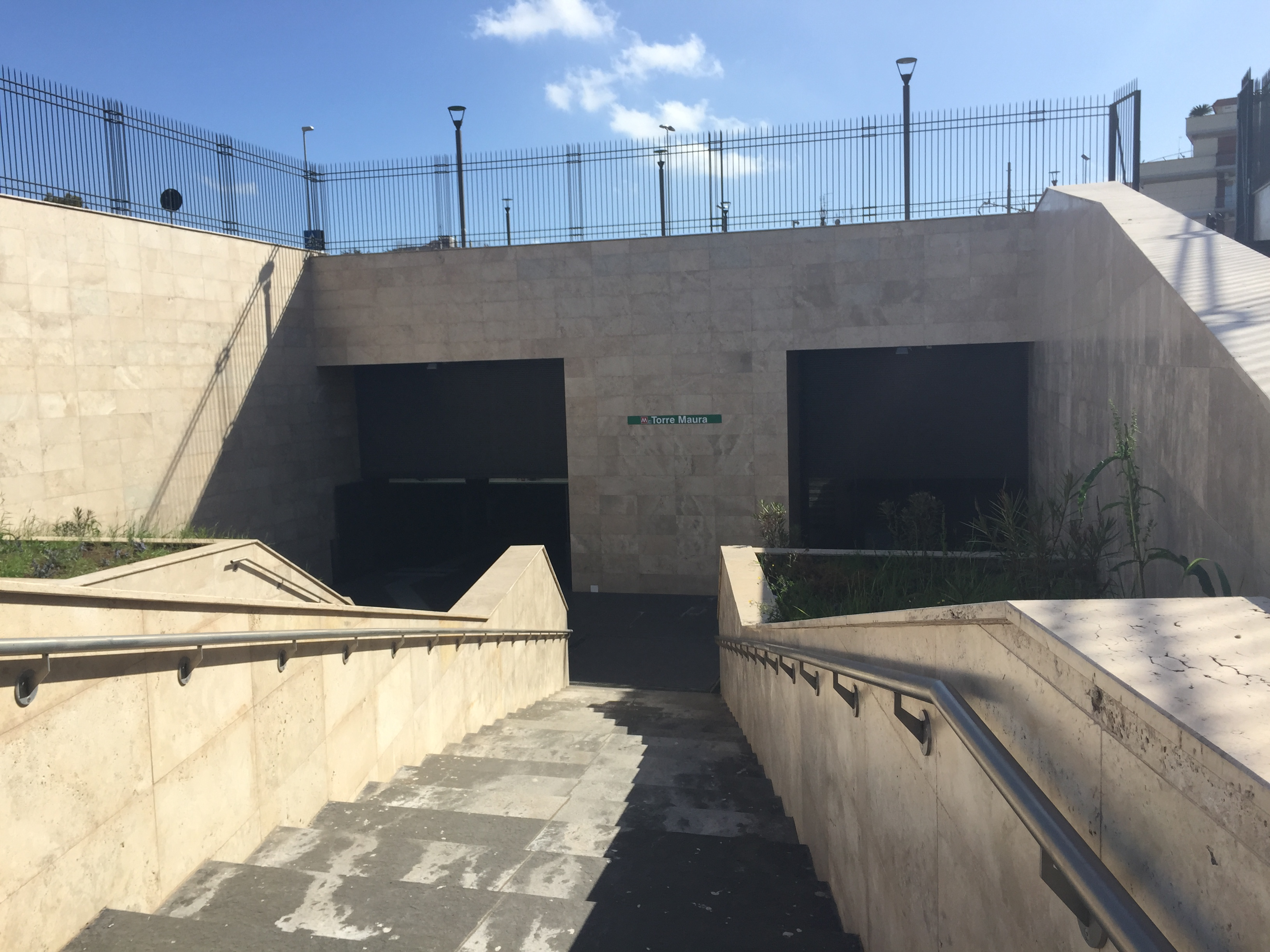

General information
- Coordinates: 41°52′01″N 12°35′49″E
- Owner: ATAC

Construction
- Structure type: Underground

History
- Opened: 9 November 2014; 12 years ago

Services
Preceding station	Rome Metro	Following station
Torre Spaccata towards Colosseo	Line C	Giardinetti towards Monte Compatri-Pantano
Location
- Click on the map to see marker

Torre Maura is an underground station of Line C of the Rome Metro. It is located at the intersection between the Via Casilina, Via dell'Aquila Reale and Via Walter Tobagi, near the Grande Raccordo Anulare. The stop serves the area of Torre Maura and provides an interchange with the Tobagi station on the Rome-Giardinetti railway.

Construction of the station started in 2007; it was opened on 9 November 2014.
