= Torrenova (Rome Metro) =

Rome metro station

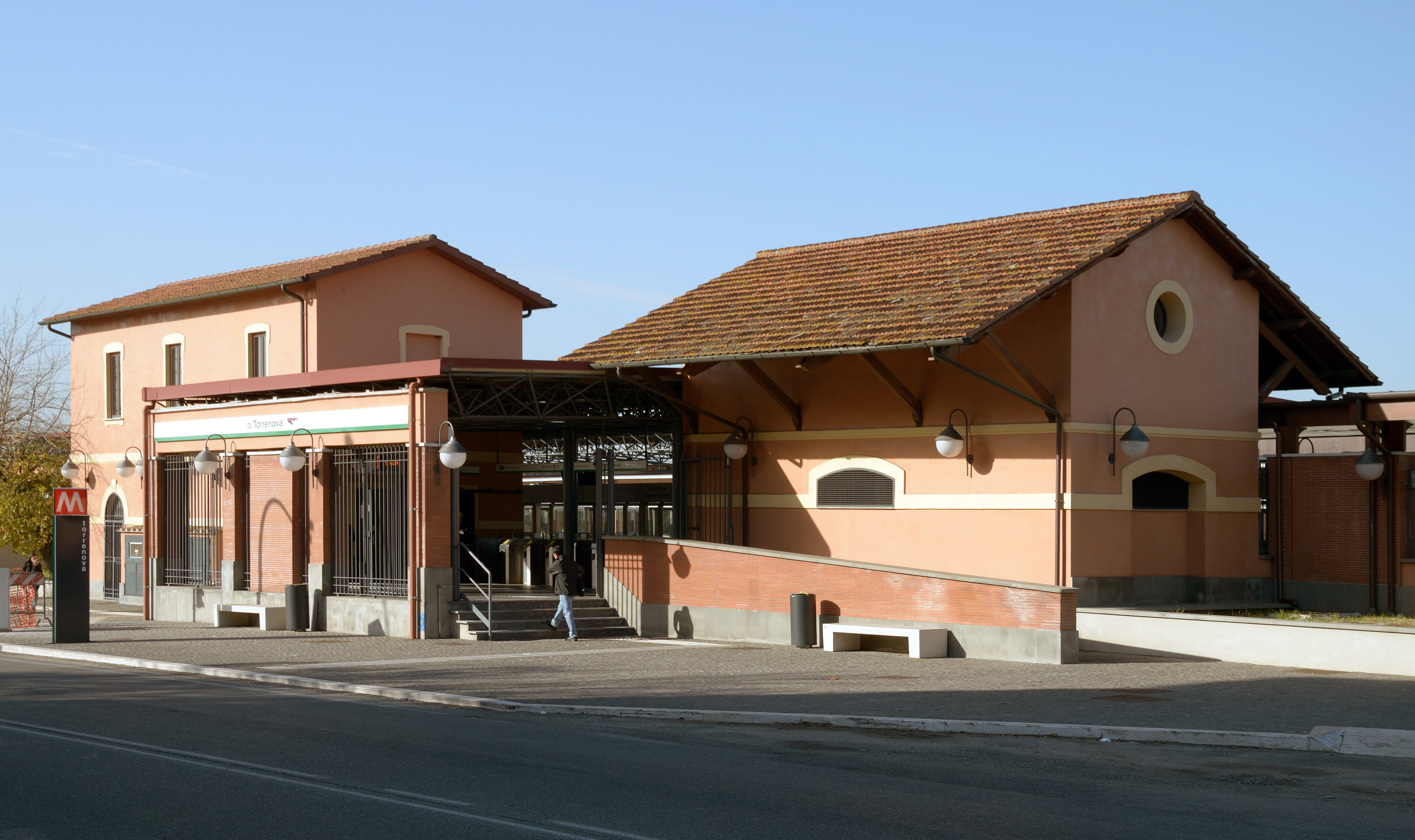

General information
- Coordinates: 41°51′48″N 12°37′01″E
- Owner: ATAC

Construction
- Structure type: surface station

History
- Opened: 9 November 2014; 12 years ago

Services
Preceding station	Rome Metro	Following station
Giardinetti towards Colosseo	Line C	Torre Angela towards Monte Compatri-Pantano
Location
- Click on the map to see marker

Torrenova is a surface station of Line C of the Rome Metro. It is located in Via Casilina, serving the Roman districts of Torre Angela, Tor Vergata and Giardinetti. It's the only above-ground stop of Line C which retained the original architecture of the historic train station on the Rome–Pantano railway line. The old train station was temporarily closed down in 2008 for restoration and modernisation works; it re-opened on 9 November 2014 as part of the new Metro line.

The station is in 5 minutes' walking distance from many cafes, restaurants, and shops.
