= Giardinetti (Rome Metro) =

Rome metro station

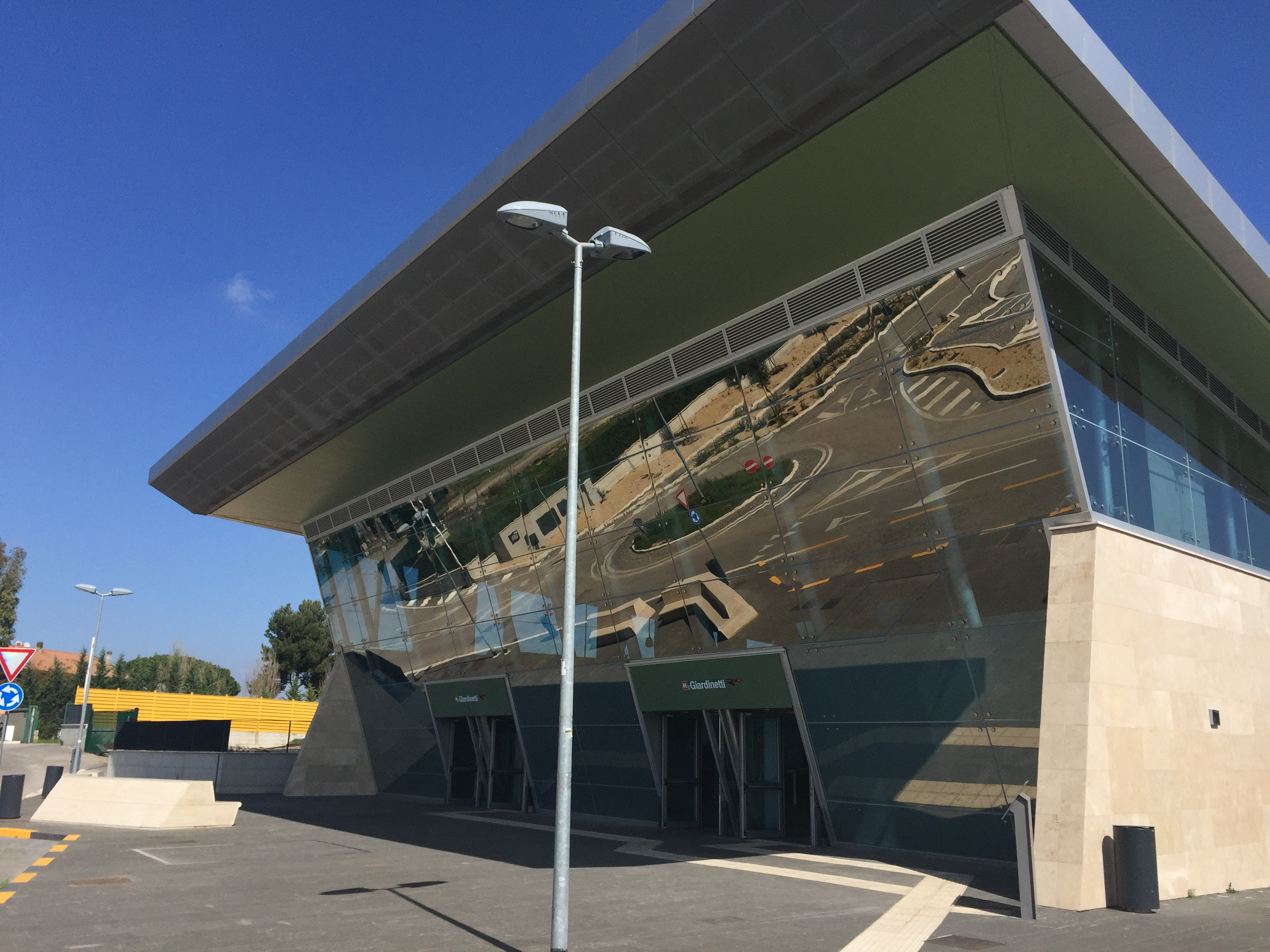

General information
- Coordinates: 41°51′51″N 12°36′36″E
- Owner: ATAC

Construction
- Structure type: underground
- Parking: yes

History
- Opened: 9 November 2014; 12 years ago

Services
Preceding station	Rome Metro	Following station
Torre Maura towards Colosseo	Line C	Torrenova towards Monte Compatri-Pantano
Location
- Click on the map to see marker

Giardinetti is an underground station of Line C of the Rome Metro. It is located along the Via Casilina, at the intersection with Via degli Orafi and Via della Fattoria di Torrenova, in the Roman district of Giardinetti, near the Grande Raccordo Anulare. Construction of the station started in 2007 and it was opened on 9 November 2014. The homonymous terminus of the Rome–Giardinetti railway line was relocated within 500 metres from the Metro station.
