= Finocchio (Rome Metro) =

Rome metro station

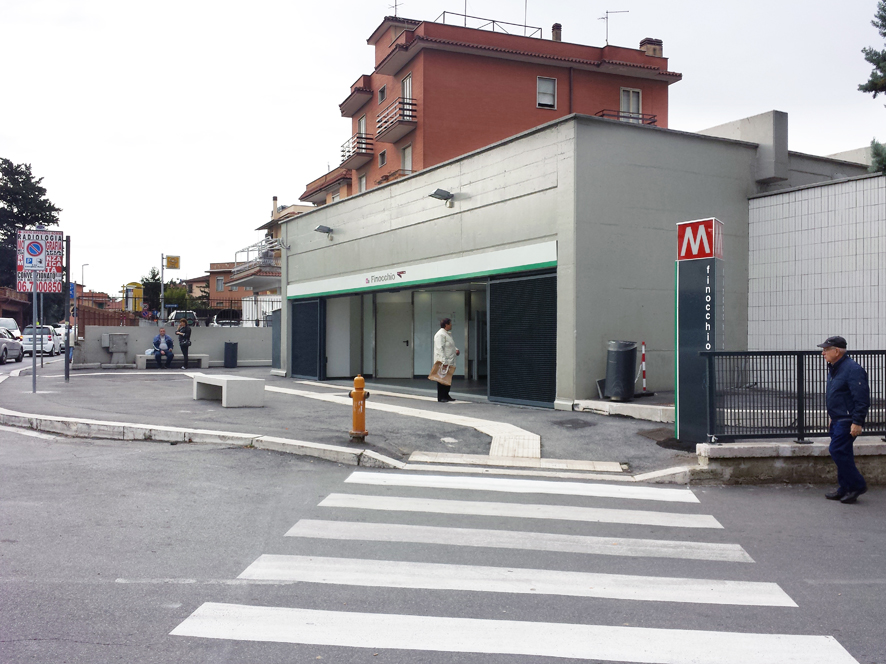

General information
- Coordinates: 41°51′56″N 12°41′16″E
- Owner: ATAC

Construction
- Structure type: at-grade

History
- Opened: 9 November 2014; 12 years ago

Services
Preceding station	Rome Metro	Following station
Bolognetta towards Colosseo	Line C	Graniti towards Monte Compatri-Pantano
Location
- Click on the map to see marker

Finocchio is a station of Line C of the Rome Metro. It is located at the intersection of Via di Rocca Cencia with Via Mandanici and Piazza Serrule, in the Roman frazione of Borgata Finocchio. After a thorough rebuilt, the stop re-opened on 9 November 2014 as part of the new Metro line.

== Nearby amenities ==
The Finocchio station is in walking distance from many cafes, restaurants, and shops.

Primarily a "suburban" residential area, there are transfers available nearby to buses 052, 055, 555, and C9.
