= Mirti (Rome Metro) =

Rome metro station

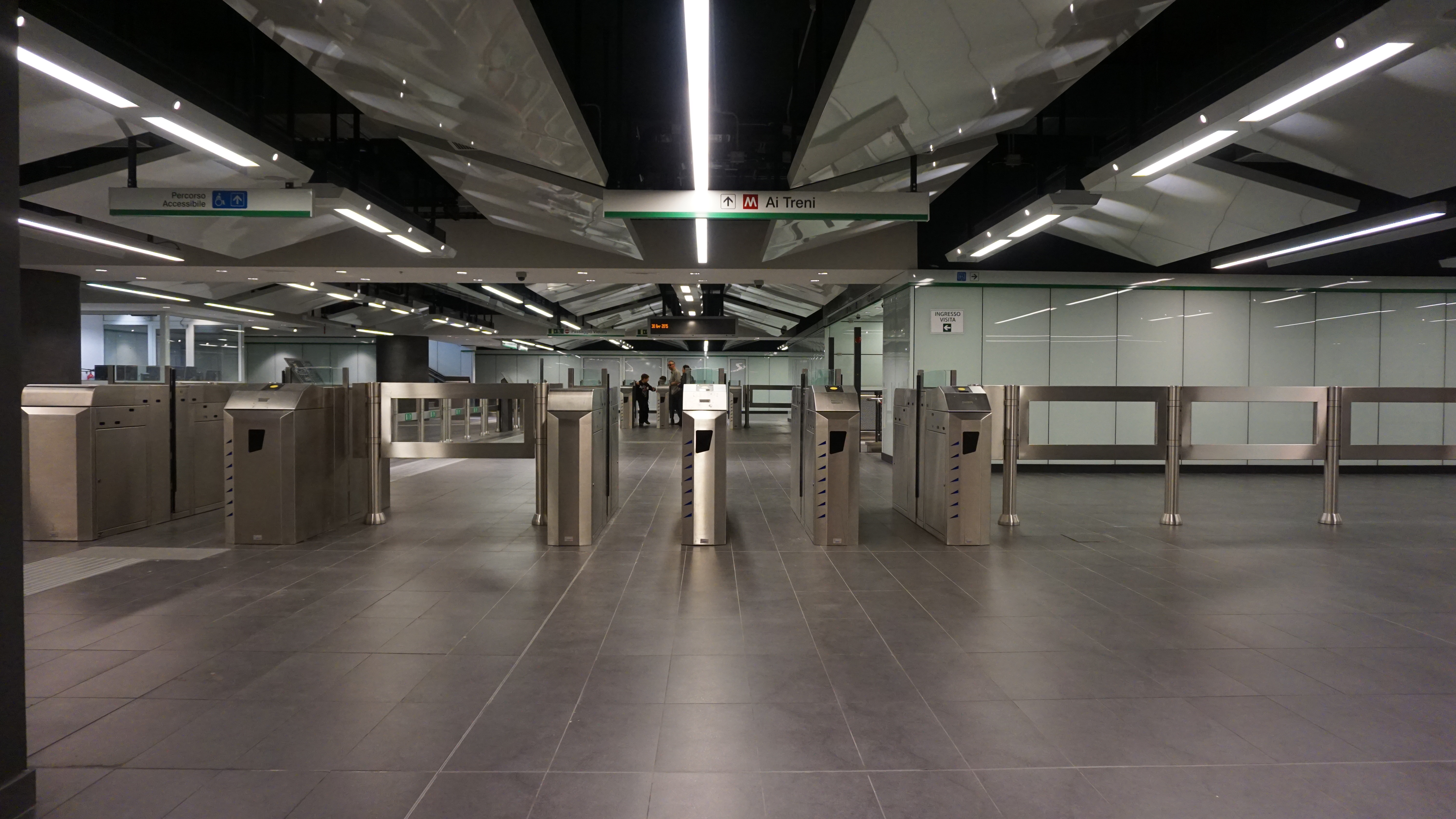
- METRO C Rome Mirti Atrium

General information
- Coordinates: 41°52′52″N 12°34′00″E
- Owner: ATAC

Construction
- Structure type: underground

History
- Opened: 29 June 2015; 11 years ago

Services
Preceding station	Rome Metro	Following station
Gardenie towards Colosseo	Line C	Parco di Centocelle towards Monte Compatri-Pantano
Location
- Click on the map to see marker

Mirti is an underground station serving Line C of the Rome Metro. The station is located under Piazza dei Mirti, in the Roman quarter of Prenestino-Centocelle.

Construction works started in 2007 and were finished in January 2015. The station opened in June 2015.
