= Teano (Rome Metro) =

Rome metro station

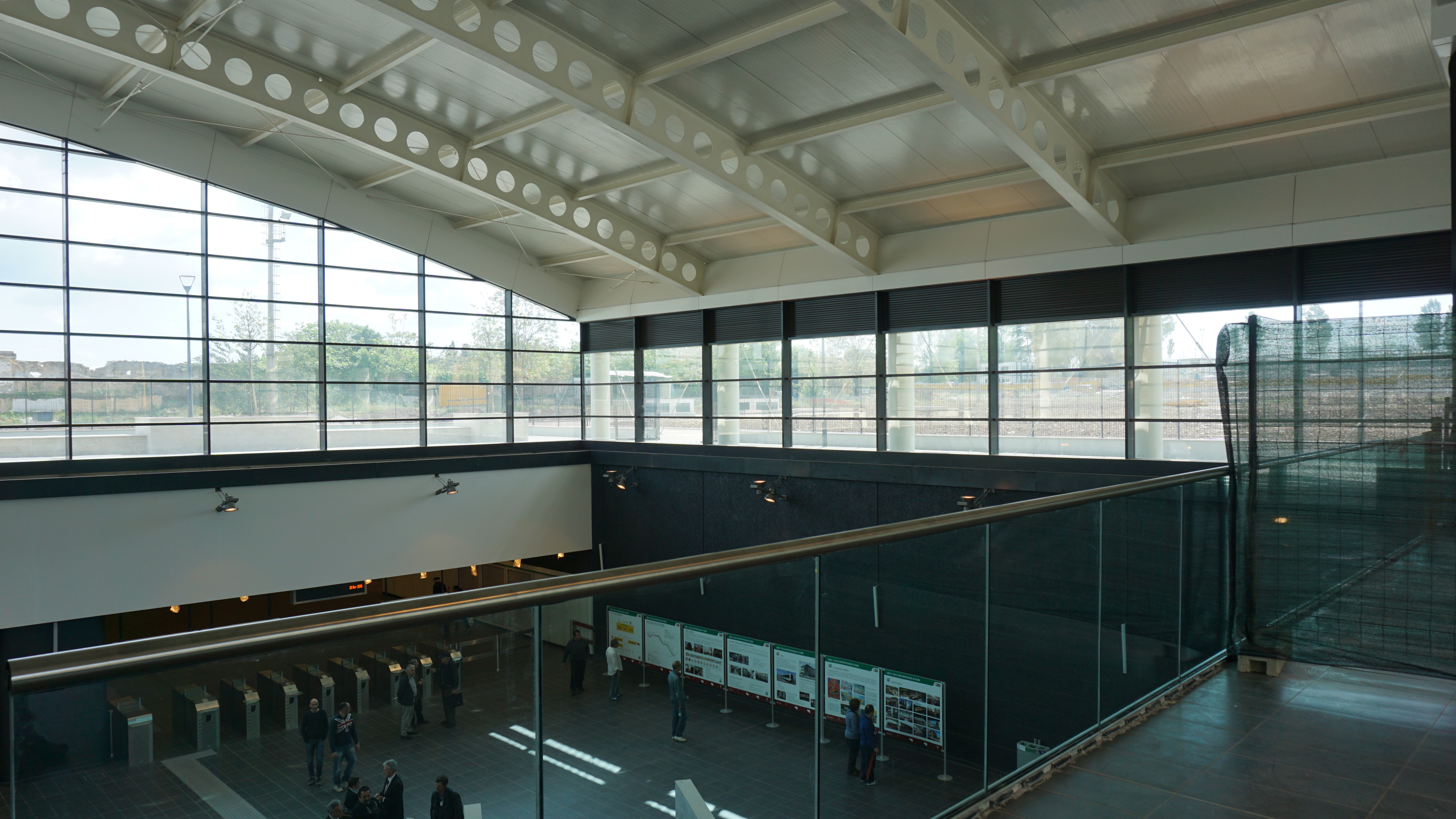

General information
- Coordinates: 41°53′21″N 12°33′05″E
- Owner: ATAC

Construction
- Structure type: underground

History
- Opened: 29 June 2015; 11 years ago

Services
Preceding station	Rome Metro	Following station
Malatesta towards Colosseo	Line C	Gardenie towards Monte Compatri-Pantano
Location
- Click on the map to see marker

Teano is an underground station of Line C of the Rome Metro. The station is located at the intersection of Via Teano and Viale Partenope, also being near several schools and sport centers. Construction works started in 2007 and were finished in January 2015. The station opened in June 2015.
