= Pigneto (Rome Metro) =

Rome metro station

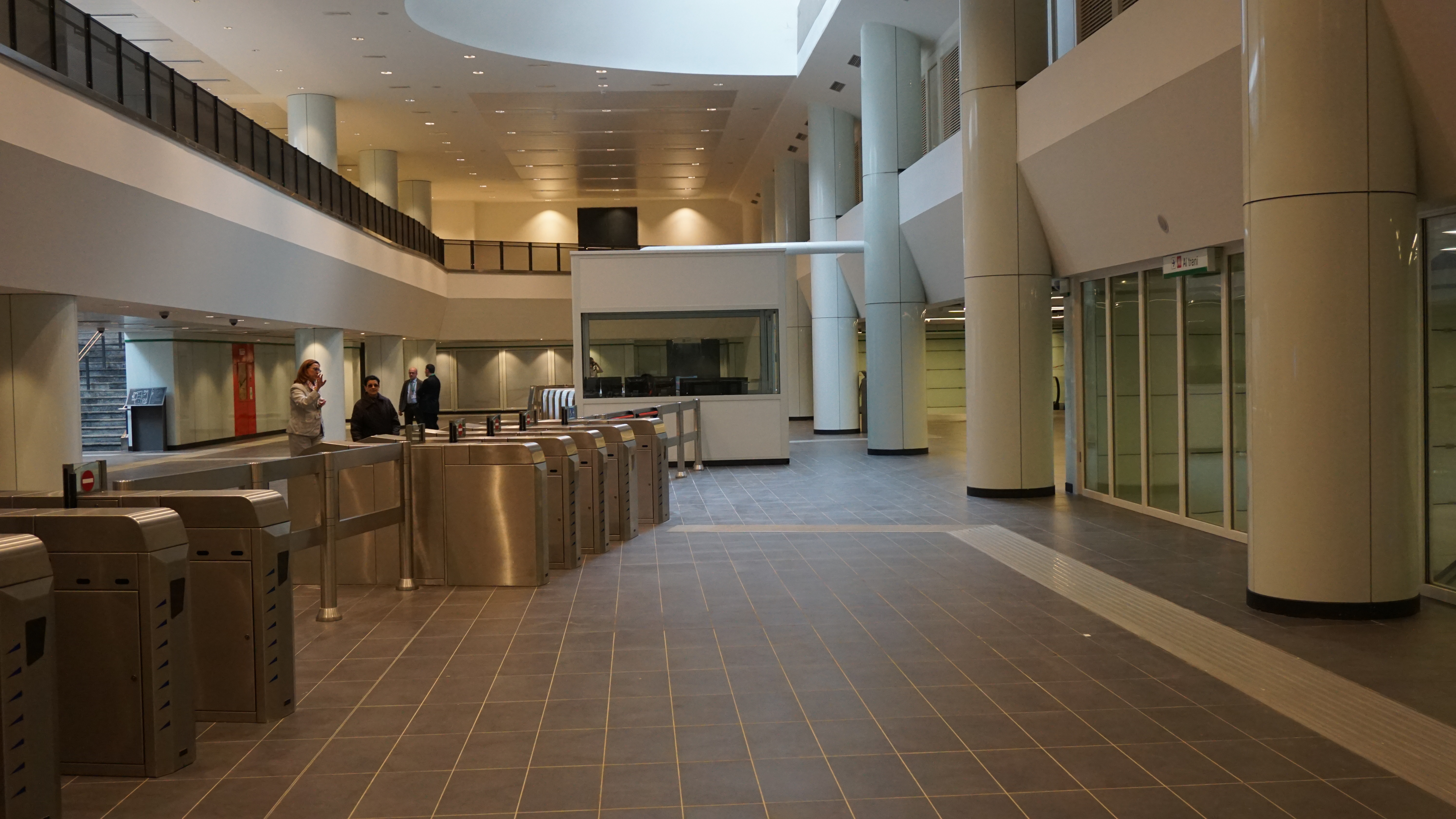

General information
- Coordinates: 41°53′18″N 12°31′41″E
- Owner: ATAC

Construction
- Structure type: underground

History
- Opened: 29 June 2015; 11 years ago

Services
Preceding station	Rome Metro	Following station
Lodi towards Colosseo	Line C	Malatesta towards Monte Compatri-Pantano
Location
- Click on the map to see marker

Pigneto is an underground station of Line C of the Rome Metro. The station is located at Via del Pigneto (hence the name) and will serve as an interchange with the FL1 regional railway once the station of the same name serving that line will be built. Construction works of the metro station started in 2007 and were finished in January 2015. The station opened in June 2015.
