= Graniti (Rome Metro) =

Rome metro station

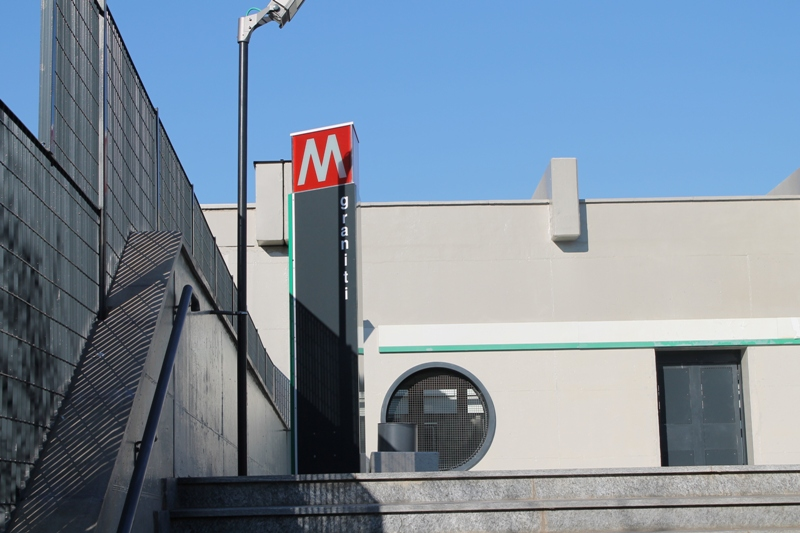

General information
- Coordinates: 41°51′56″N 12°41′53″E
- Owner: ATAC

Construction
- Structure type: at-grade

History
- Opened: 9 November 2014; 12 years ago

Services
Preceding station	Rome Metro	Following station
Finocchio towards Colosseo	Line C	Monte Compatri-Pantano Terminus
Location
- Click on the map to see marker

Graniti is a station of Line C of Rome Metro. It is located at the intersection of Via Graniti with Via Tortorici, in the Roman frazione of Borgata Finocchio. It used to be a train station of the Rome-Pantano railway line until 2008, when rebuilding works commenced. With the inauguration of Line C, the stop re-opened on 9 November 2014. This station also serves the nearby depot of the line's rolling stock, and it extends over 21.7 hectares.

Among the other things, the premises host the maintenance and control centre of Line C.
