= Malatesta (Rome Metro) =

Rome metro station

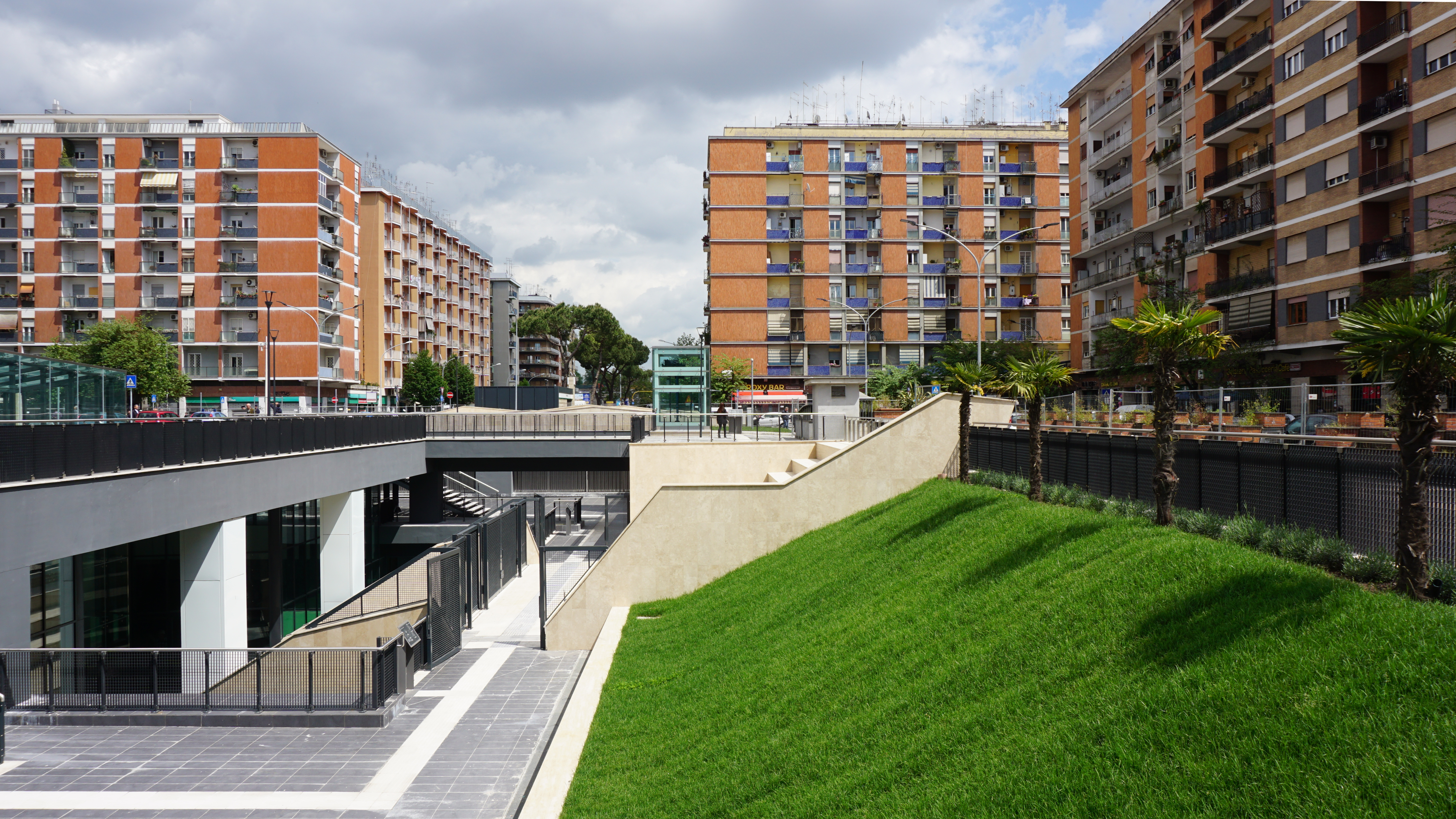
- The entrance to the metro station, April 2015

General information
- Coordinates: 41°53′14″N 12°32′25″E
- Owner: ATAC

Construction
- Structure type: underground

History
- Opened: 29 June 2015; 11 years ago

Services
Preceding station	Rome Metro	Following station
Pigneto towards Colosseo	Line C	Teano towards Monte Compatri-Pantano
Location
- Click on the map to see marker

Malatesta is an underground station of Line C of the Rome Metro. The station is located at Piazza Roberto Malatesta (from which it takes the name). Construction works started in 2007 and were finished in January 2015. The station opened in June 2015.
