= Lodi (Rome Metro) =

Rome metro station

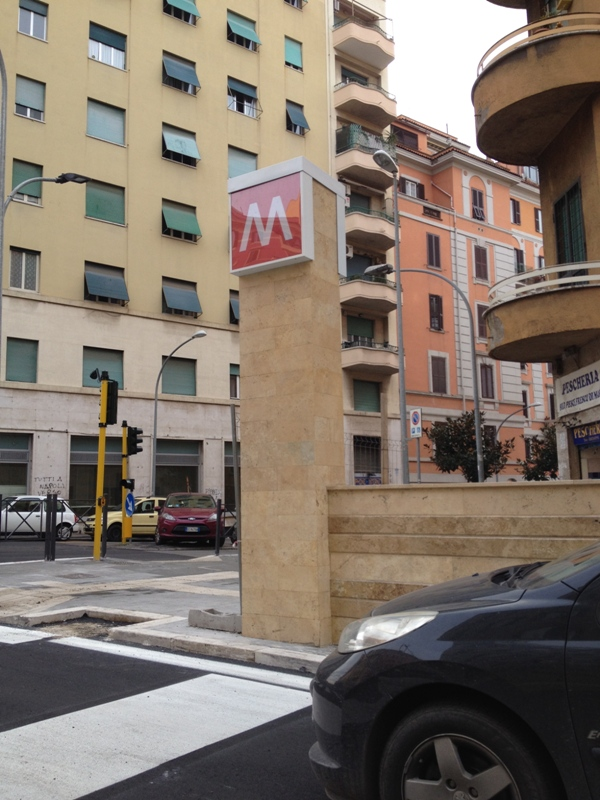

General information
- Coordinates: 41°53′12″N 12°31′04″E
- Owner: ATAC

Construction
- Structure type: underground

History
- Opened: 29 June 2015; 11 years ago

Services
Preceding station	Rome Metro	Following station
San Giovanni towards Colosseo	Line C	Pigneto towards Monte Compatri-Pantano
Location
- Click on the map to see marker

Lodi is an underground station of Line C of the Rome Metro; it opened on 29 June 2015.

It served as the western terminus of Line C until 12 May 2018, when the line was extended to San Giovanni.

The station is not exactly located in Piazza Lodi, after which it is named, but further west in Via La Spezia, between Via Orvieto and Piazza Camerino. Works started in 2007 and were finished in January 2015.
