= Porta Metronia (Rome Metro) =

Rome metro station

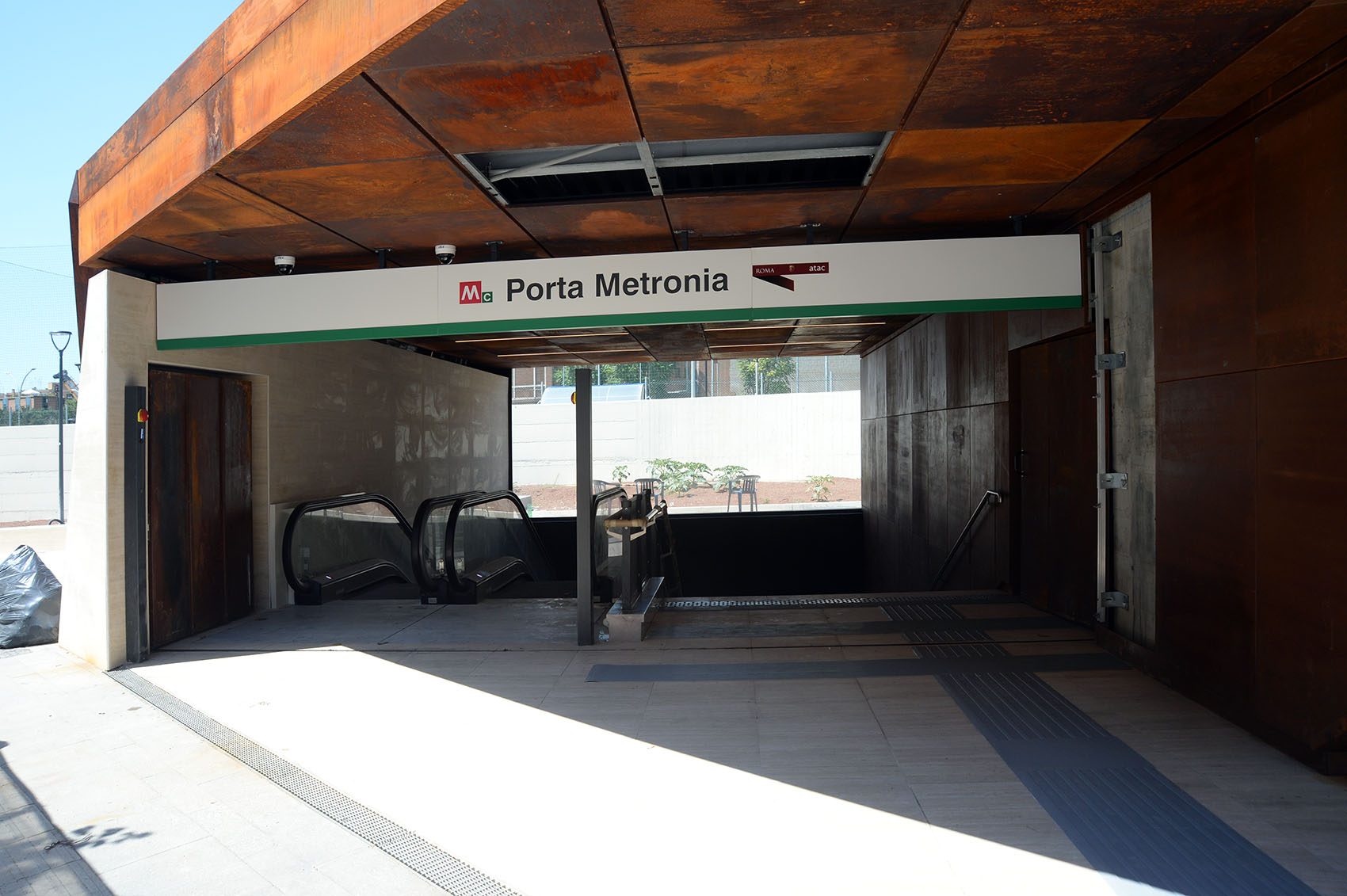
- Entrance

General information
- Coordinates: 41°52′59″N 12°30′10″E
- Owner: ATAC
- Line: Line C

Construction
- Structure type: underground

History
- Opening: December 16, 2025; 11 months ago

Services
Preceding station	Rome Metro	Following station
Colosseo Terminus	Line C	San Giovanni towards Monte Compatri-Pantano
Location

Porta Metronia, previously known with the name Amba Aradam-Ipponio, is an underground station of Line C of the Rome Metro. The station will be located between two important interchanges of the Roman metro system – the station Fori Imperali-Colosseo (Line B) and San Giovanni (Line A). Construction works started in 2013 and was completed in 2025.

During excavation of the station in 2016, a Roman barracks dating back to the 2nd century AD was unearthed 9 metres (30 ft) below street level.

In the summer of 2020, in the wake of the protests triggered by the Black Lives Matter movement, Mayor Virginia Raggi proposed a record in the Capitoline Assembly, which was later approved, to name the station after the Italian-Somali partisan Giorgio Marincola. Amba Aradam was the site of the decisive and gruesome Battle of Amba Aradam of the Second Italo-Ethiopian War, followed by a massacre of Ethiopian troops. On September 14, 2022, it was announced that the new name of the station would be "Porta Metronia", from the nearby namesake gate in the Aurelian Walls.

On 16th December 2025, the station has opened to the public.
