= Via Casilina =

Street in Rome, Italy

The Via Casilina is a medieval road in Latium and Campania. It led from Rome to Casilinum (present-day Capua), to present-day Santa Maria Capua Vetere.

It was created from the fusion of two ancient Roman roads, the Via Latina and the Via Labicana. The Via Labicana led from Rome to Labicum, while the Via Latina ended at Capua.

In the Middle Ages, Capua was depopulated and the main settlement shifted to Casilinum, formerly a mere fluvial port. This is also the location of the modern town of Capua. As a consequence, the union of the Via Latina and of the Via Labicana took on the new namesake of Via Casilina. This usage also survives for the modern road, while Via Latina is not used anymore.

== Itinerary ==
=== Current route ===
The current route of the state road Via Casilina leaves the Porta Maggiore in Rome and, entering the Roman countryside, first runs through the valley of the river Sacco, crossing Frosinone, and then the Liri valley, passing through the center of Cassino; enters Campania remaining in the northern part of the province of Caserta and joins with the via Appia in the municipality of Pastorano in province of Caserta. The current route is approximately 200 kilometers long.
