= Line C (Rome Metro) =

Rapid transit line in Rome, Italy

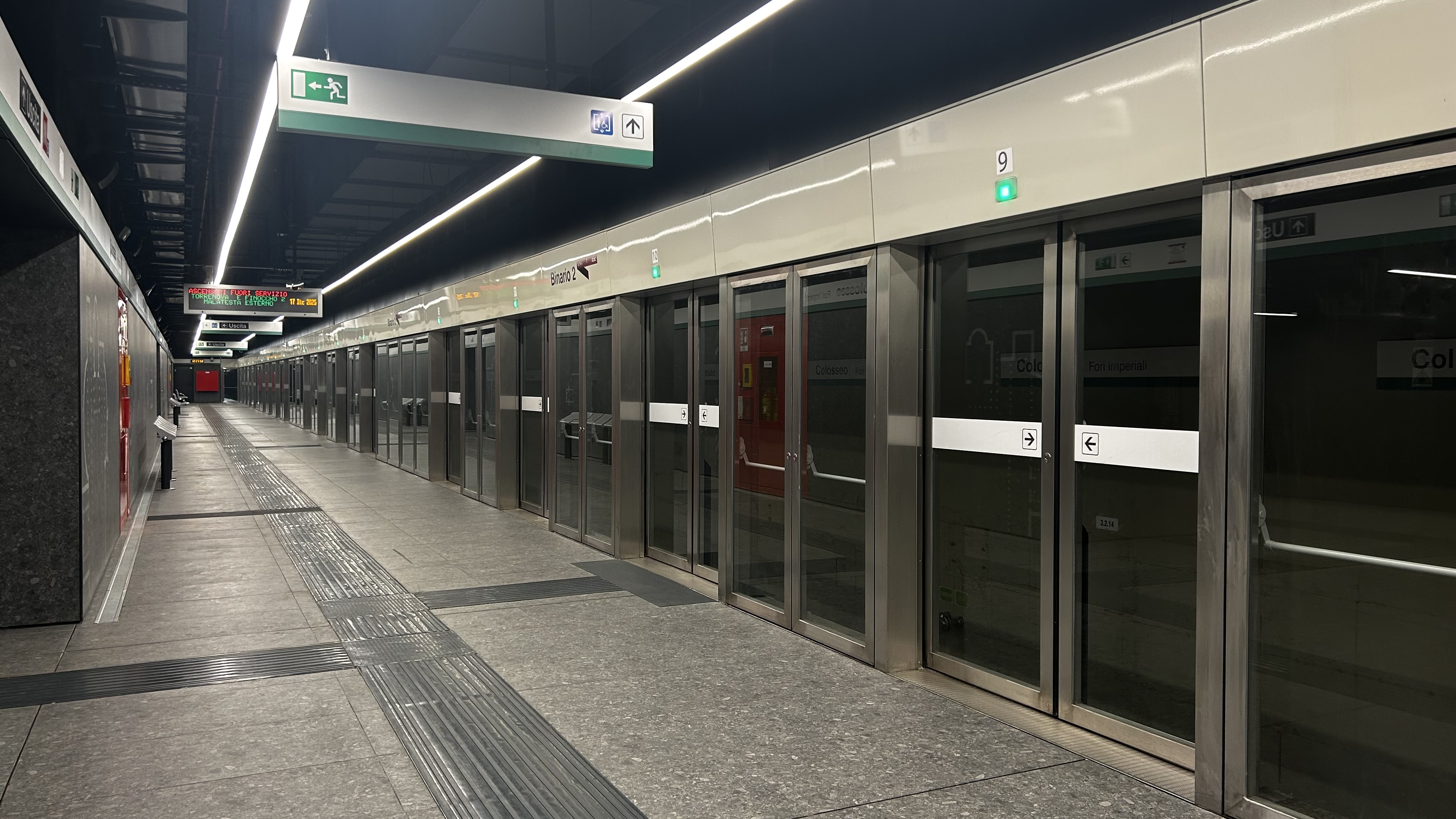
- Colosseo station

Overview
- Owner: ATAC
- Locale: Rome, Italy
- Termini: Monte Compatri-Pantano (east); Colosseo (west)
- Stations: 24

Service
- Type: Rapid transit
- System: Rome Metro
- Operator: ATAC
- Rolling stock: AnsaldoBreda Driverless Metro
- Daily ridership: 40,999 (2023)

History
- Opened: 9 November 2014; 11 years ago
- Last extension: 16 December 2025

Technical
- Line length: 21.2 km (13.2 mi)
- Character: underground, at-grade and elevated
- Track gauge: 1,435 mm (4 ft 8 1/2 in)
- Electrification: Overhead lines
Route map

Line C is a Rome Metro line which runs from Monte Compatri-Pantano in the eastern suburbs of Rome, Italy, to its central hub at Colosseo. It is the third metro line built in the city and the first to be fully automated and driverless.

The line has operational interchanges with two other networks: Line A at San Giovanni and Line B at Colosseo.

The network opened in four successive phases: the first section between Monte Compatri-Pantano and Parco di Centocelle debuted on 9 November 2014; the second run to Lodi followed on 29 June 2015; the third section to San Giovanni opened on 12 May 2018; and the central section extending to Porta Metronia and Colosseo opened to the public on 16 December 2025. The line reuses portions of the former Rome-Pantano railway, a historic light rail corridor that represented the final remaining segment of the wider Rome–Fiuggi–Alatri–Frosinone railway.

== History ==
Archaeological investigations began in August 2006, followed by the deployment of the first active surface construction sites in March 2007 at Piazza Roberto Malatesta to build Malatesta station. Excavation work at Lodi station commenced one month later.

In May 2008, two large tunnel boring machines (TBMs) were assembled at Giardinetti. Shortly after, the old Rome–Pantano narrow-gauge surface railway was truncated at Giardinetti to facilitate the total transformation of the eastern ground alignment into the modernized metro layout. This initial ground section opened in late 2014.

While original structural planning across the historic city center faced budgetary and administrative suspensions during the 2010s, funding for the entire crossing was later restored. Construction works for the landmark station at Piazza Venezia started actively in 2023, with advanced deep-underground engineering scheduled to proceed through the late 2020s. The extension further northwest toward Ottaviano and its eventual northern terminus at Farnesina (formerly Clodio-Mazzini) is fully funded and under definitive planning to establish a strategic secondary transfer point with Line A.

During preliminary exploration trenches under Piazza Venezia in 2009, workers uncovered well-preserved structural remains of Emperor Hadrian's Athenaeum, which have been carefully integrated into the ongoing structural architectural plans of the modern hub.

=== Opening dates ===
- 9 November 2014: Pantano – Parco di Cento Celle
- 29 June 2015: Parco di Cento Celle – Lodi
- 12 May 2018: Lodi – San Giovanni
- 16 December 2025: San Giovanni – Colosseo

== Route ==
Line C operates along 21.4 kilometers (13.3 mi) of total active route, incorporating 24 operating stations. The layout combines elevated or at-grade outer eastern tracks with deep underground tunnels traversing the urban center. Technical maintenance and depot infrastructure are centered at the dedicated Graniti facility.

In the central underground sectors, station architecture has been explicitly tailored to act as on-site museums. At the Porta Metronia station, extensive remains of a 2nd-century Roman military barracks utilized by the Praetorian Guard were discovered during tunneling and are permanently displayed in situ behind wide protective glass structures. Similarly, the interchange complex at Colosseo hosts a public museum area showcasing dozens of ancient artifacts recovered throughout the excavation process, reversing previous cancellations caused by initial funding shortages.

An initial engineering design featuring a central stop at Largo di Torre Argentina was permanently abandoned due to the density and historical sensitivity of the archaeological strata discovered on site. To improve multi-modal regional transit, construction is underway at Pigneto to build a dedicated interchange station connecting Line C directly with the FL1 and FL3 regional rail corridors.

== Statistics ==
Year	2014	2015	2016	2017	2018	2019	2020	2021	2022	2023	2024
Passengers (millions)	0.50	7.64	13.30	12.26	16.20	18.72	10.26	11.70	13.55	14.96	16.62

== Extensions ==
The central extension of Line C is being developed in successive phases. The section connecting San Giovanni to Colosseo is approximately 3.6 kilometers (2.2 mi) long and features an intermediate station near the San Giovanni Addolorata Hospital, officially named Porta Metronia (originally known during planning as Amba Aradam-Ipponio). This central section was completed and officially opened to the public on 16 December 2025.

Construction is actively progressing further northwest toward Piazza Venezia, while long-term master plans retain the ultimate objective of extending the underground line across the northern urban quadrants toward Grottarossa.

Section	Construction start	Estimated opening	Length	Stations	Project status
Colosseo ↔ Piazza Venezia	23 June 2023	2033	0.8 km	1	Under construction
Piazza Venezia ↔ Mazzini	26 February 2026	2036	3.9 km	4	Under construction
Mazzini ↔ Farnesina	23 July 2026	2036	2.5 km	2	Under construction

== Stations ==
=== Gallery ===
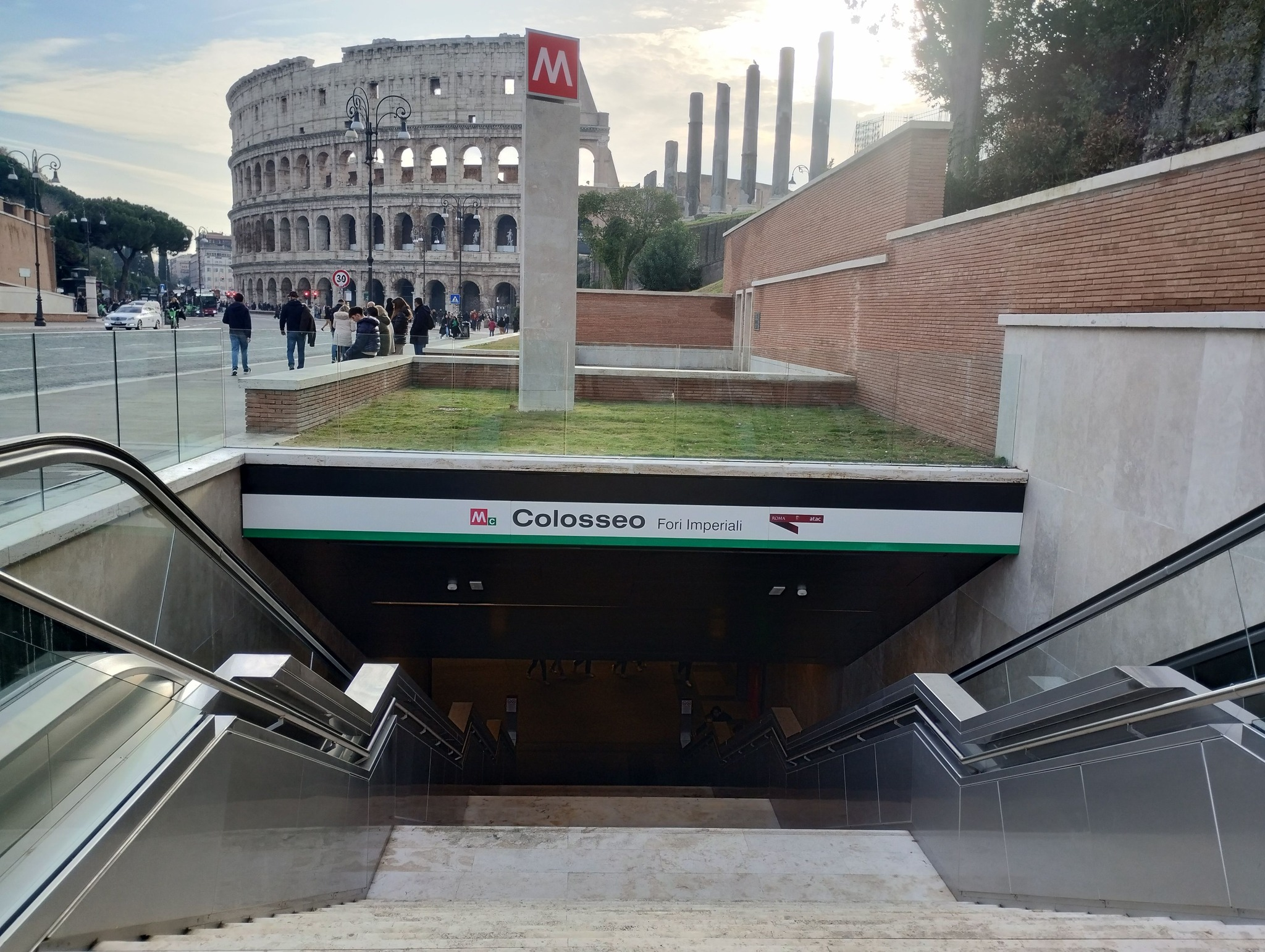
Colosseo

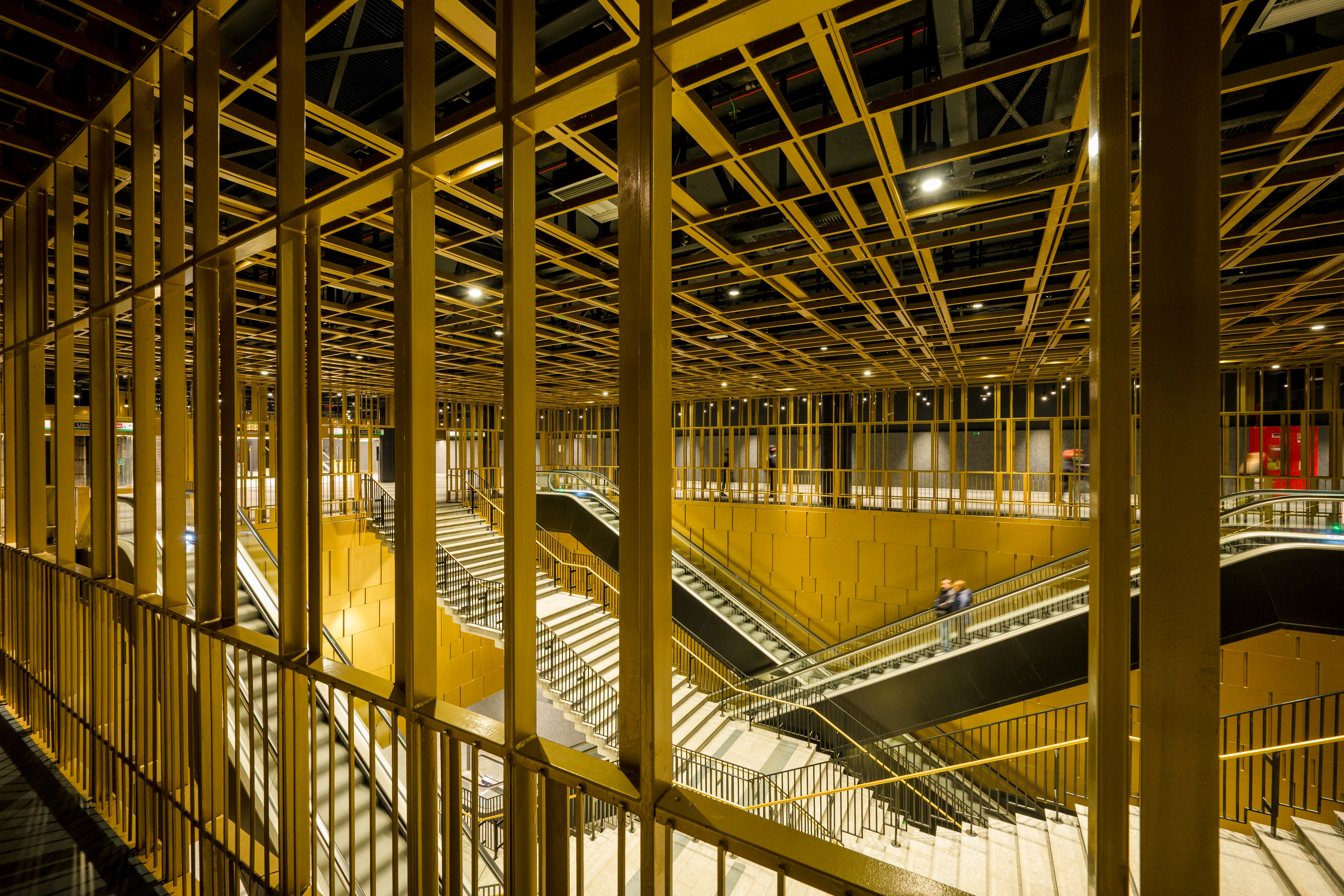
Colosseo

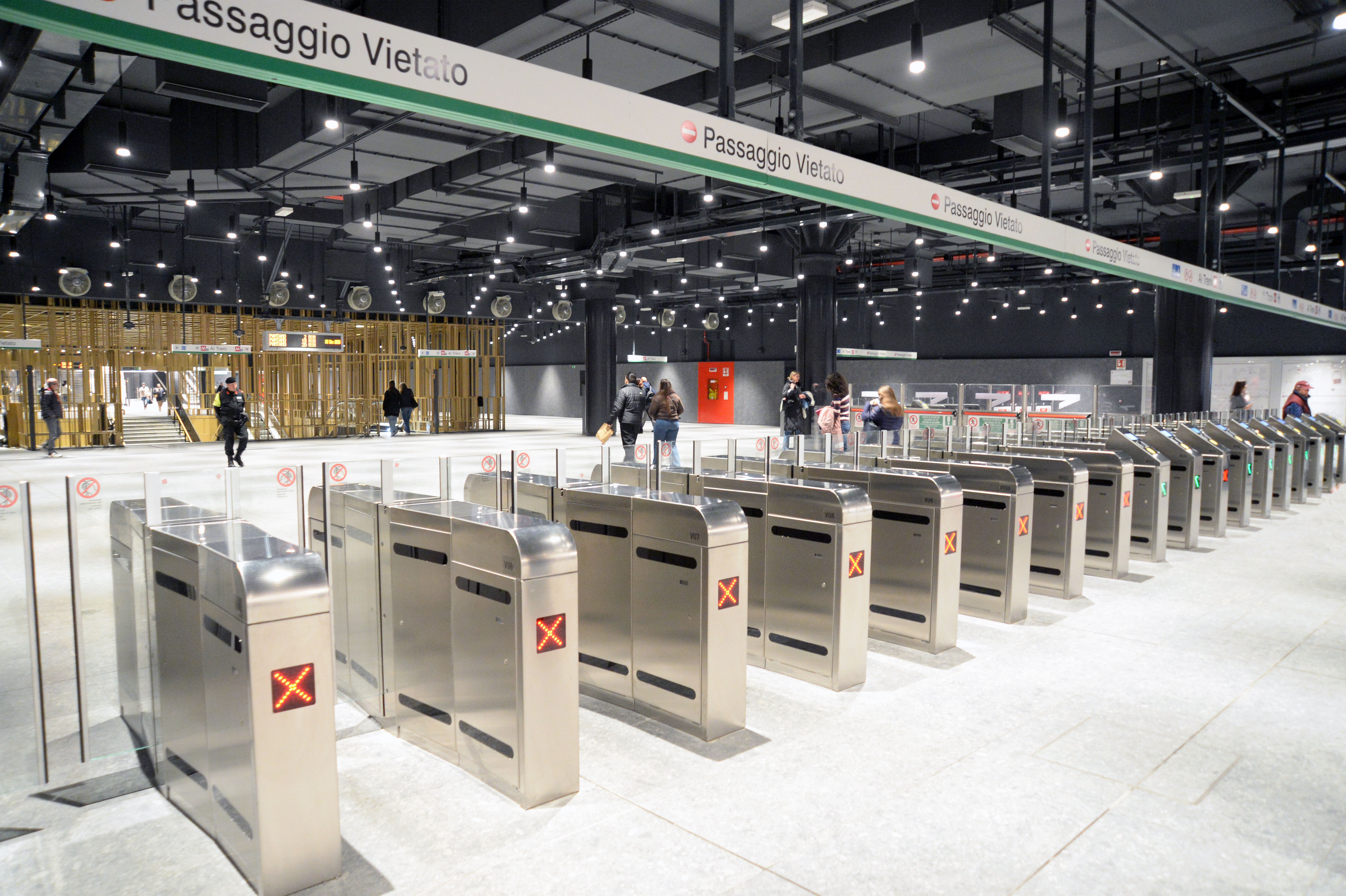
Colosseo

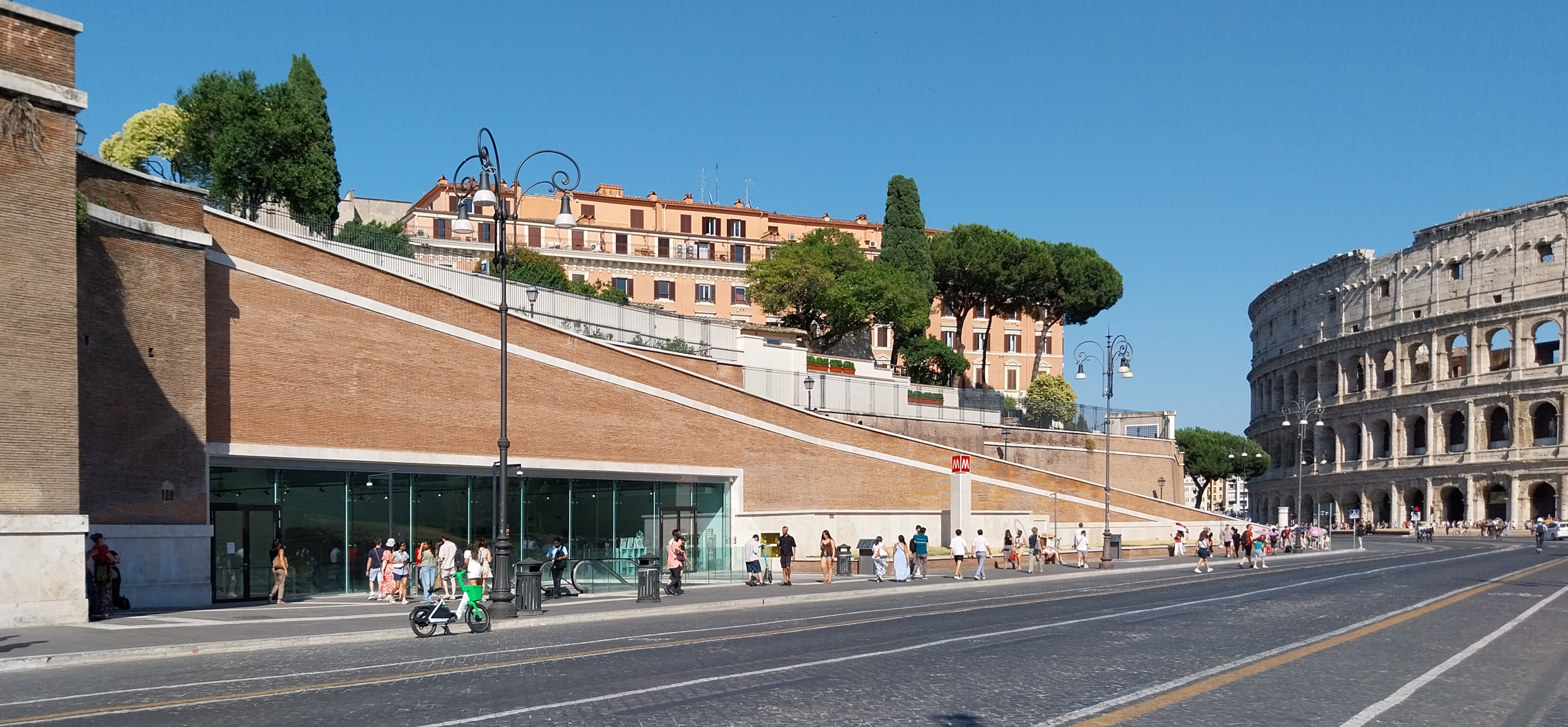
Colosseo

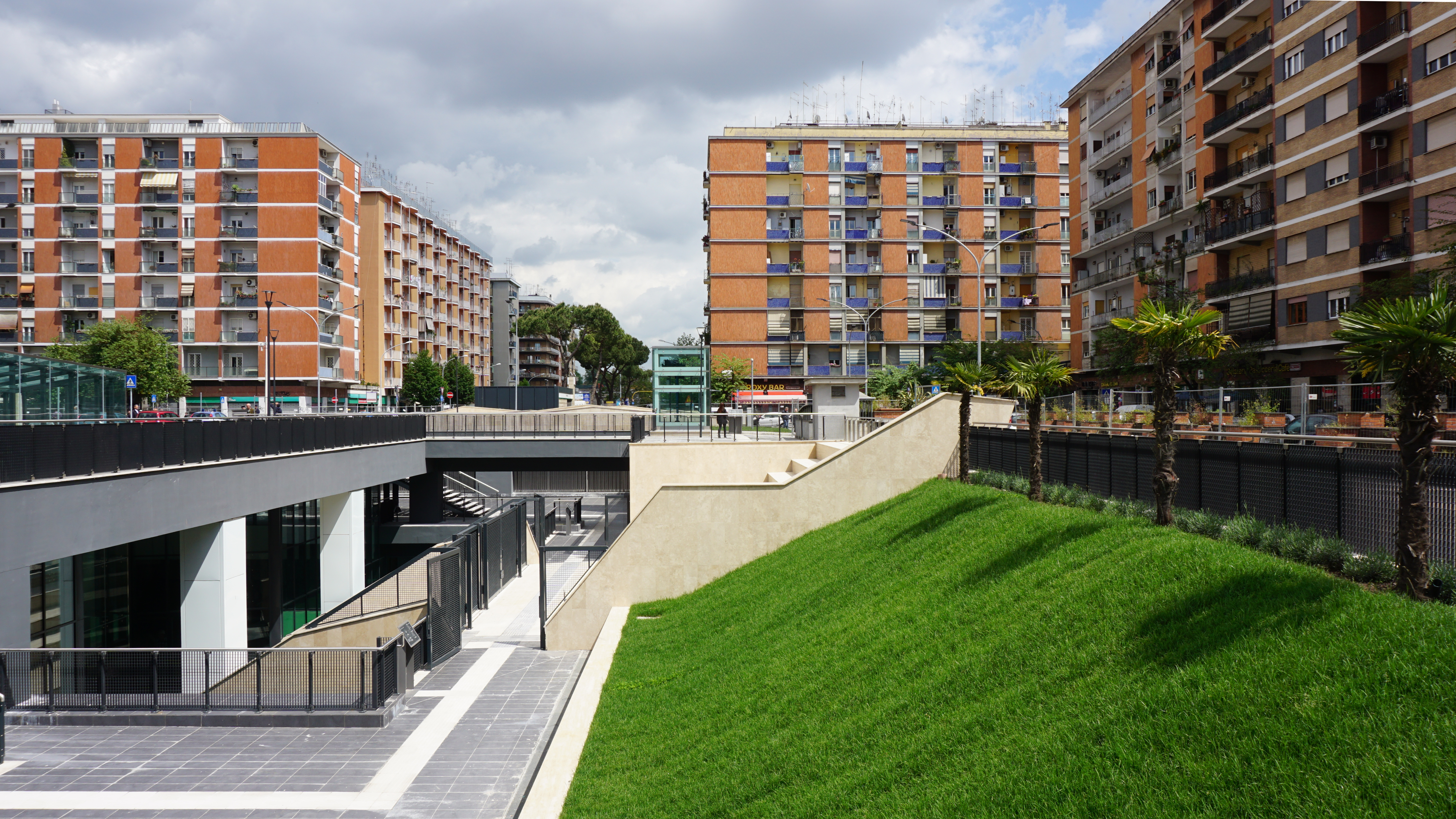
Malatesta

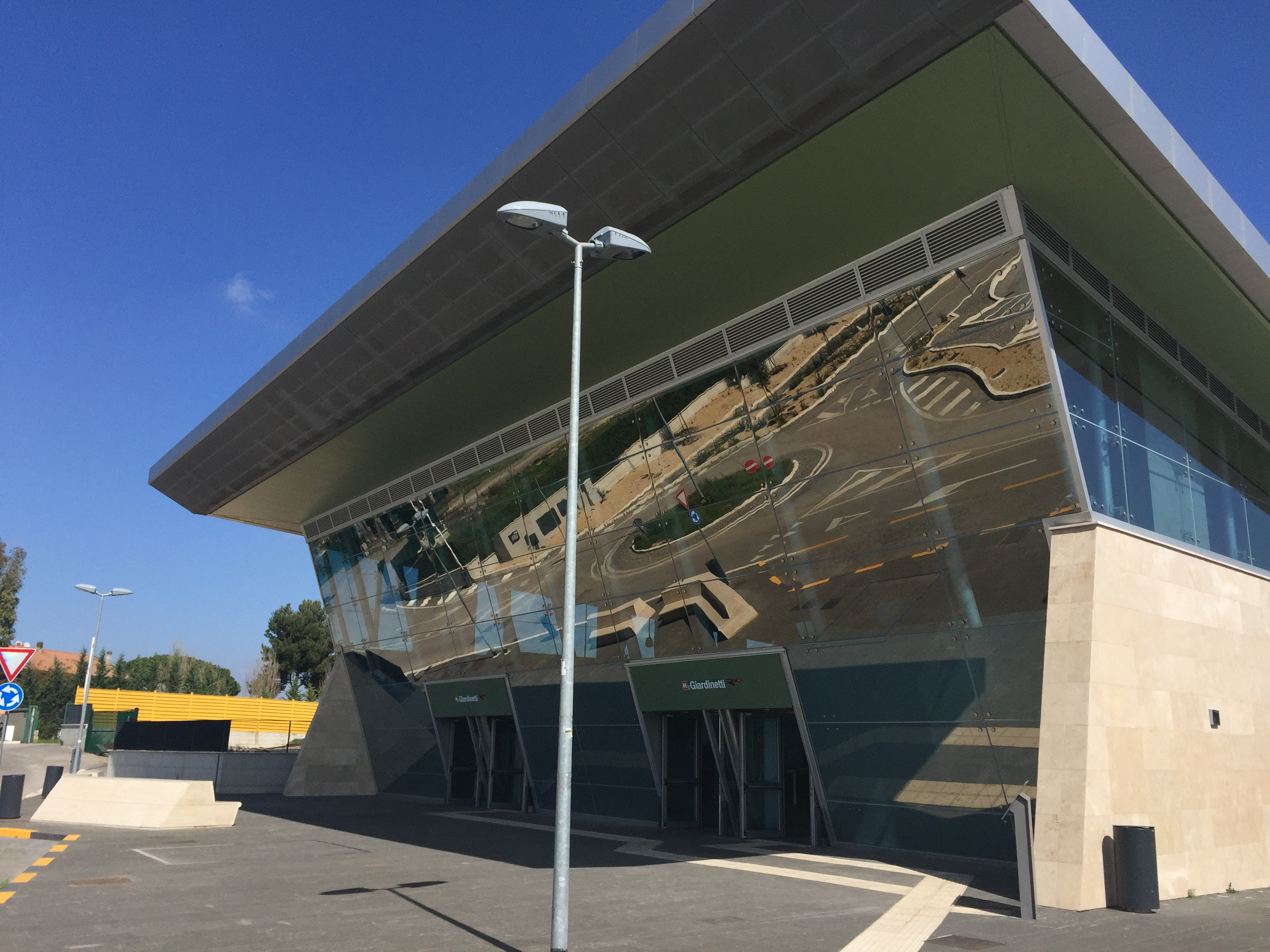
Giardinetti

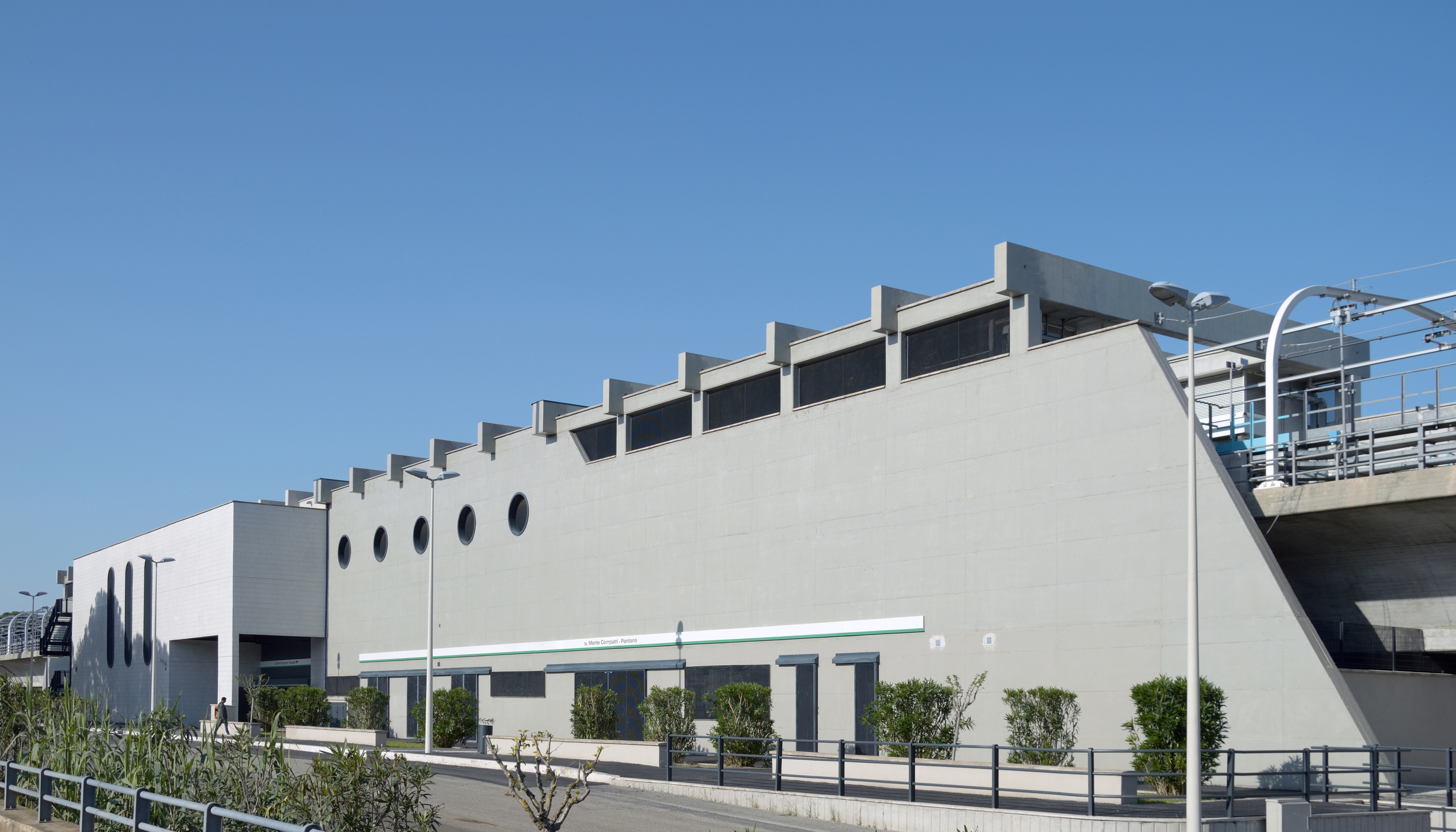
Monte Compatri-Pantano

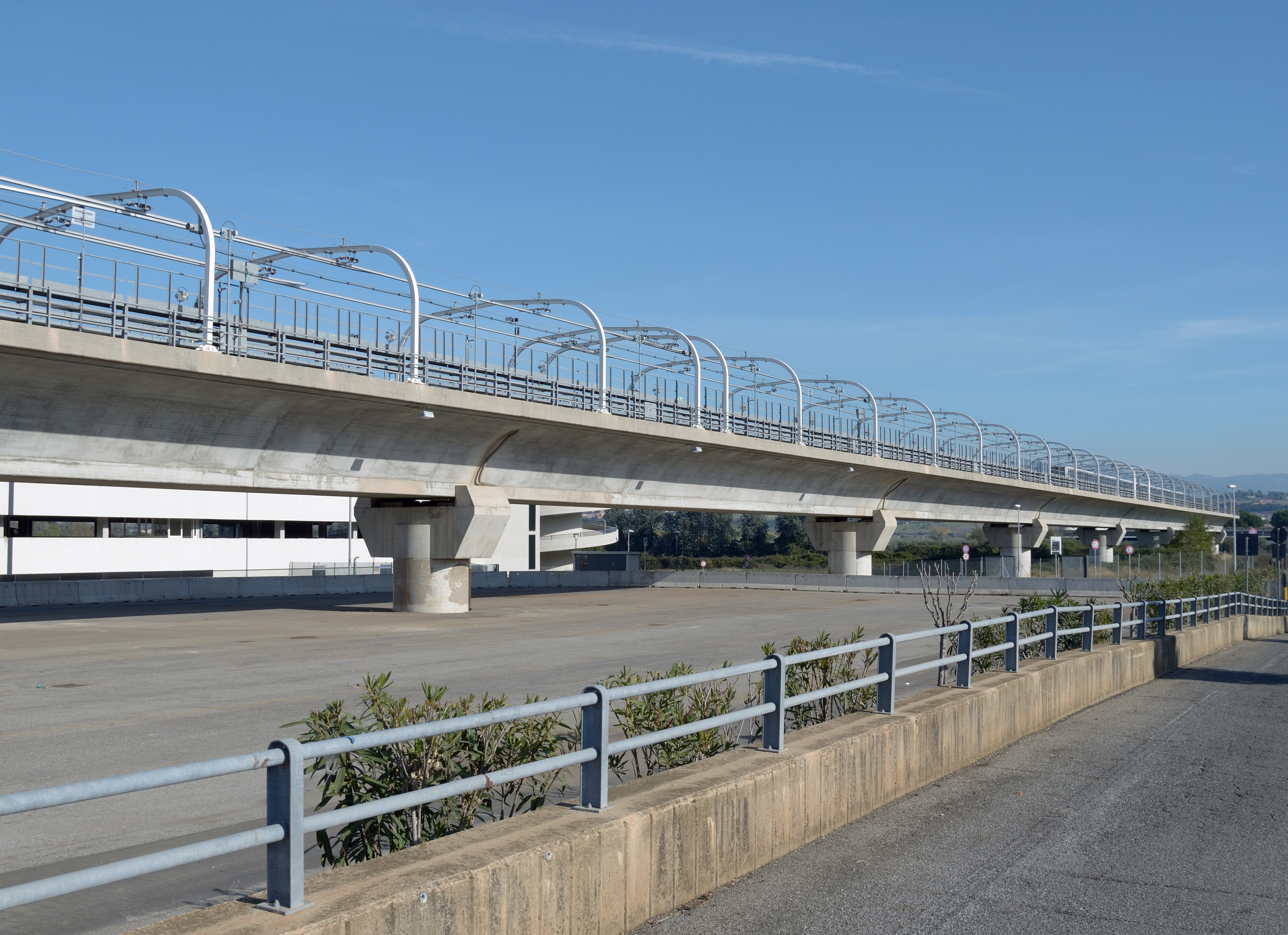
End of the line in Monte Compatri-Pantano
