= Monte Compatri-Pantano (Rome Metro) =

Rome metro station

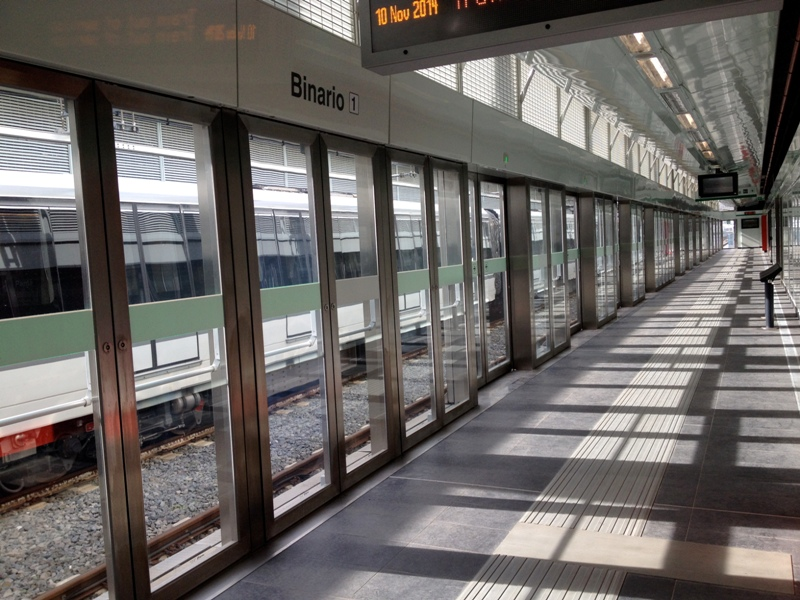

General information
- Coordinates: 41°51′56″N 12°42′27″E
- Owner: ATAC

Construction
- Structure type: elevated
- Parking: yes

History
- Opened: 8 November 2014; 12 years ago

Services
| Preceding station | Rome Metro | Following station |
|---|---|---|
| Graniti towards Colosseo | Line C | Terminus |
Location
- Click on the map to see marker

Monte Compatri-Pantano is the eastern terminus of Line C of the Rome Metro. It is located in Pantano (a frazione of the comune of Monte Compatri), along the Via Casilina; thus being the only Roman Metro station outside the Rome municipality border.

The station used to serve as the terminus of the Rome–Pantano railway (the urban section of which now forms the Rome–Giardinetti railway). The former railway station was closed in 2008 so as to be rebuilt into the terminus of the new Metro line; it re-opened on 9 November 2014.
