= Colosseo (Rome Metro) =

Rome metro station

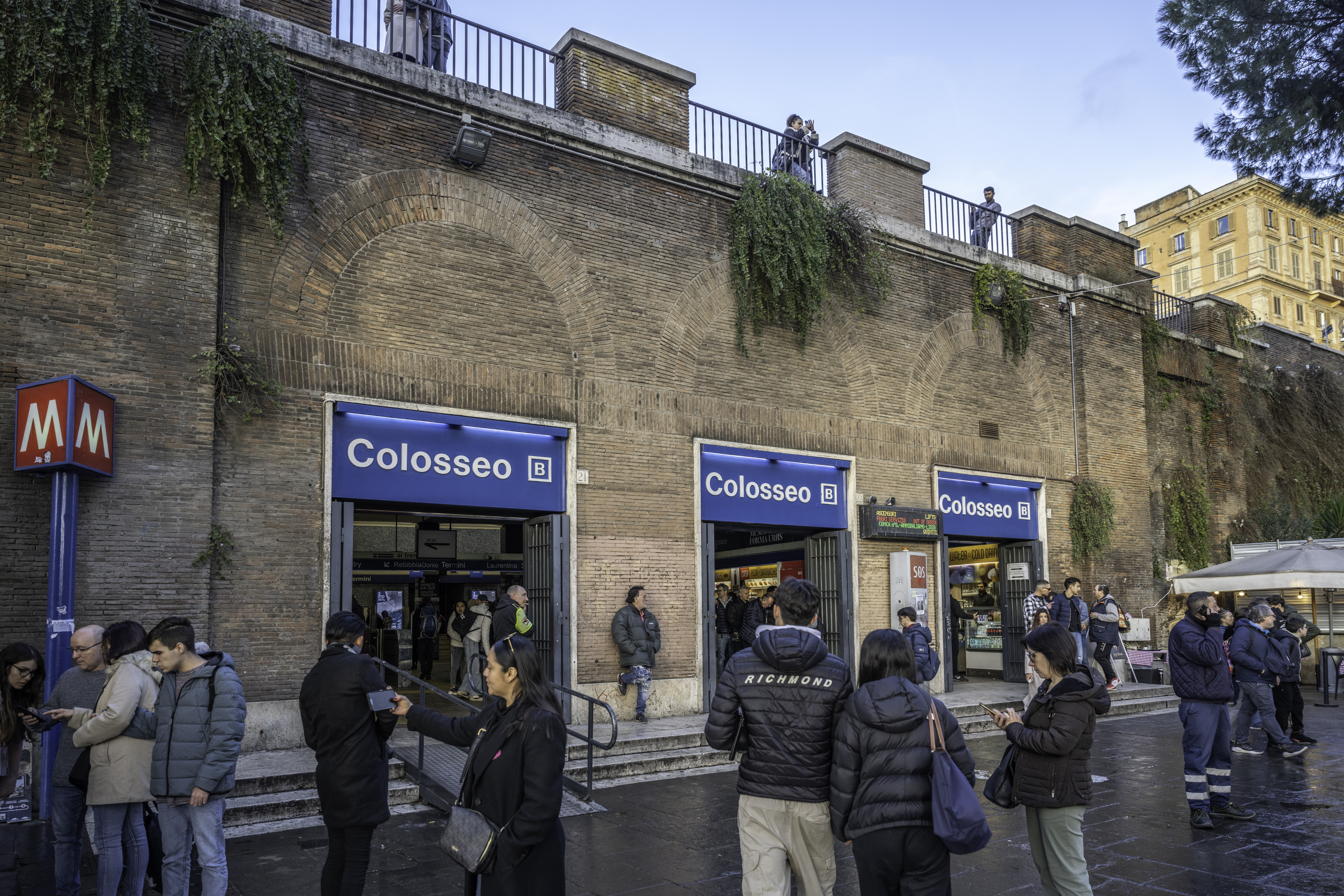
- The main entrance to the station on the Piazza Del Colosseo. Exiting here, passengers immediately see the Colosseum and Arch of Constantine in front of them

General information
- Owner: ATAC
- Platforms: 2 side platforms

Construction
- Structure type: Underground

Other information
- Website: 41°53′29″N 12°29′29″E

History
- Opened: 10 February 1955; 71 years ago

Services
Preceding station	Rome Metro	Following station
Circo Massimo towards Laurentina	Line B	Cavour towards Rebibbia or Jonio
Terminus	Line C	Porta Metronia towards Monte Compatri-Pantano
Future service
Venezia Terminus	Line C	Porta Metronia towards Monte Compatri-Pantano
Location
- Click on the map to see marker

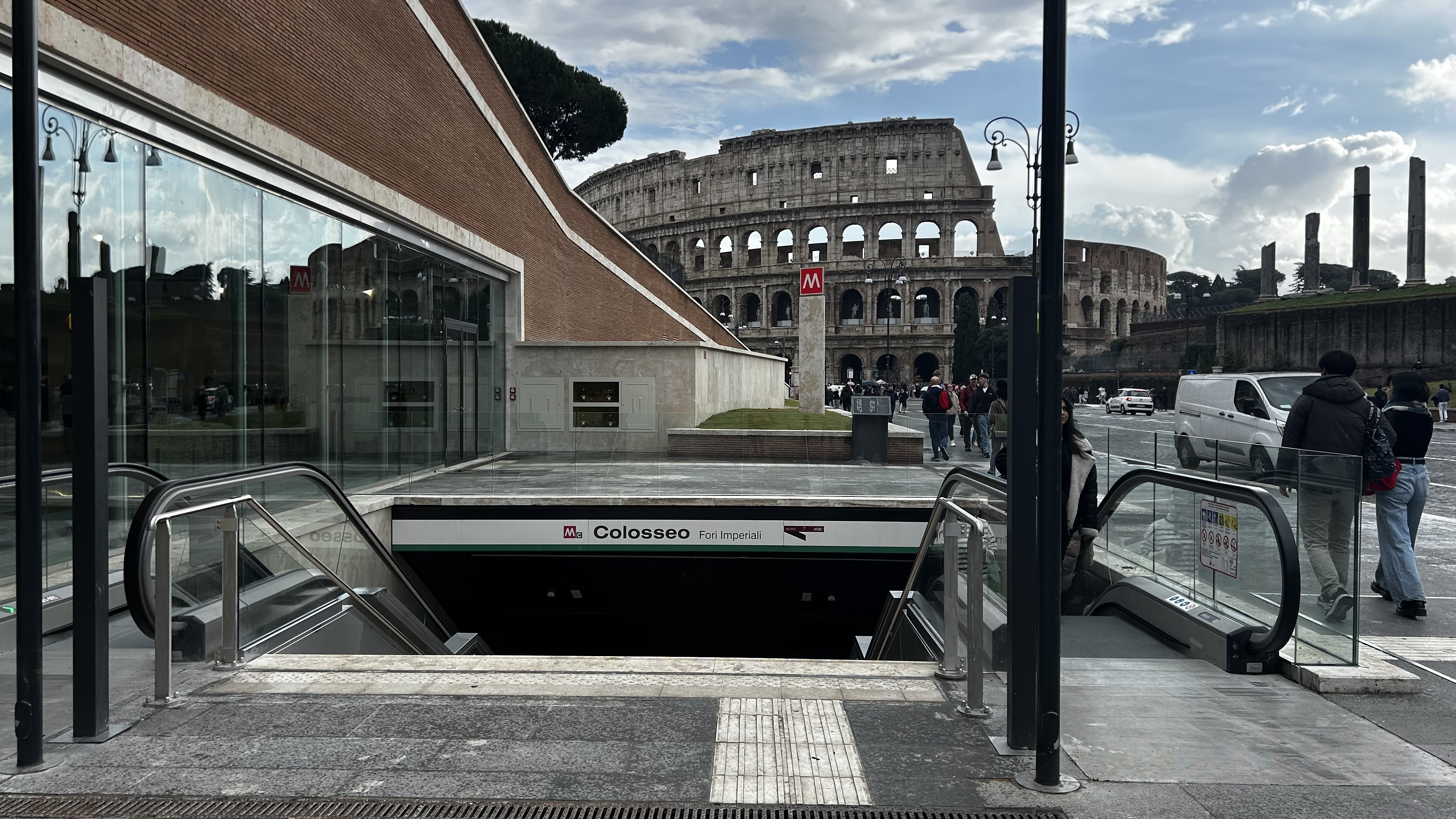
The Colosseum and the entrance to the metro station in December 2025.

Colosseo is a station on Line B and on Line C of the Rome Metro. It was opened on 10 February 1955 and is located, as its name suggests, in the Monti rione on Piazza del Colosseo near the Colosseum.

The station hosts a museum itinerary and is part of the Rome Metro's archaeo-stations network. The archaeological finds unearthed during the construction of the metro trace the ancient history of Rome, from the Regal Age to the Roman Republic and Imperial Rome. This collection of finds has revealed 28 wells from the Republican era, the balneae of a domus dating from the 1st century BC to the 1st century AD, and a domus with frescoes from the Imperial era. The station also features an oculus in the passageway connecting Line B and Line C, offering a suggestive view of the Flavian Amphitheater from below.

The atrium of the originally line B metro station houses mosaics from the Artemetro Roma Prize. They are by Pietro Dorazio (Italy), Kenneth Noland (United States) and Emil Schumacher (Germany). The station is spread over two street levels. The main entrance for Line B is on the lower level, opposite the Colosseum in Piazza del Colosseo and to the right of the Arch of Constantine. The second-floor entrance is located in the center of the park on Largo Gaetana Agnesi above the square. The two entrances for Line C are on either side of Via dei Fori Imperiali.

== History ==
The station was designed within the first section between the Termini and Laurentina stations to offer a rapid connection between the city center and the newly created EUR district, designated as the site of the 1942 Universal Exhibition, canceled after the outbreak of the World War II. With Italy's entry into the war in 1940 the works were suspended and only resumed in 1948. The stop was inaugurated in conjunction with the first section of the future line B on 9 February 1955, being opened to the public the following day.

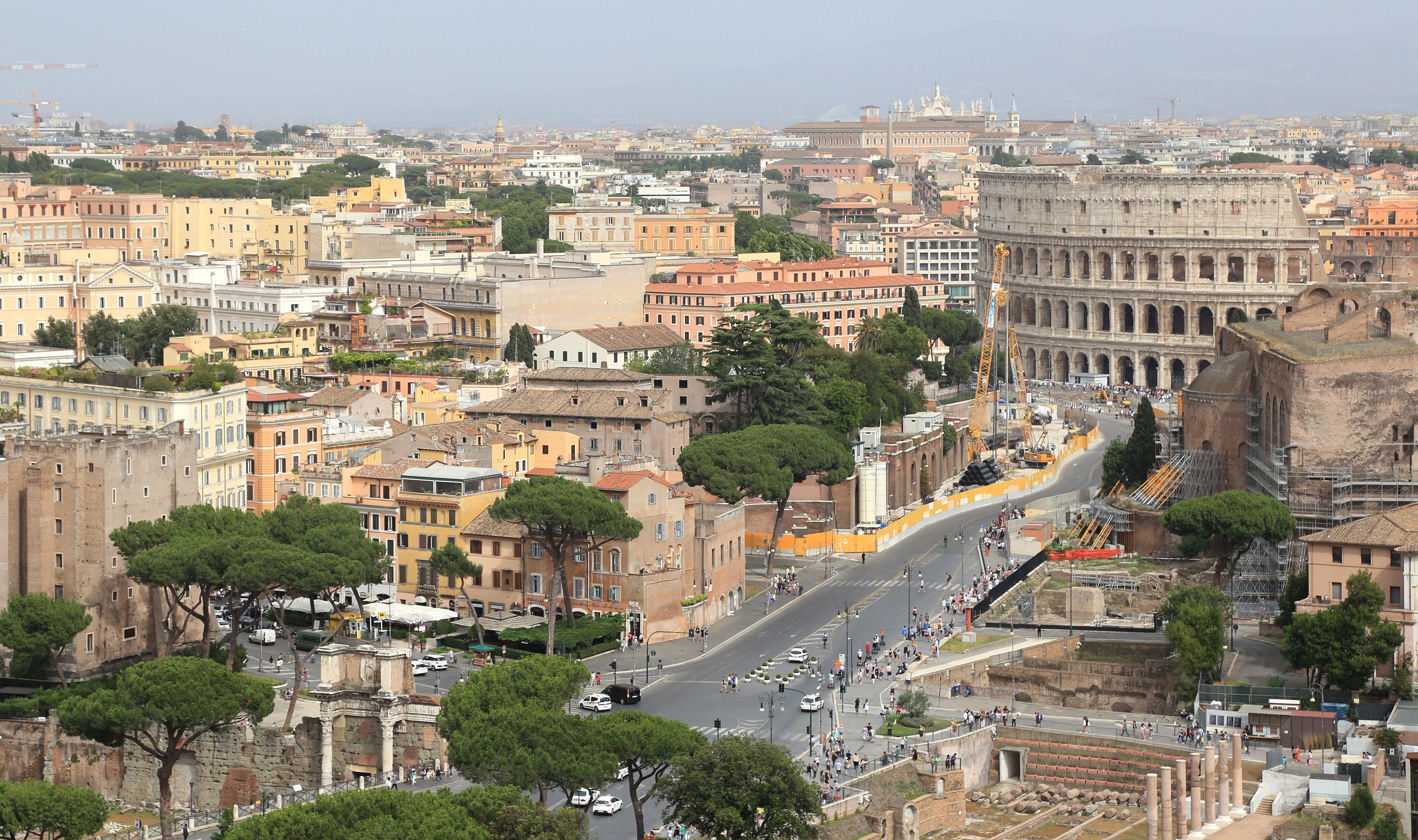
View of Via dei Fori Imperiali and the works on Line C of the metro.

Construction work on the Colosseo interchange station with metro line C began in April 2013. Announced by the Mayor of Rome Roberto Gualtieri, the Transport councilor of Rome Eugenio Patanè and the Minister of Transport Matteo Salvini. The station entered service on 16 December 2025, following its renaming to Colosseo with the suffix Fori Imperiali.

== Surroundings ==
- Domus Aurea
- Basilica of Maxentius
- Caelian Hill
- Military hospital of Celio

=== Churches ===
- San Pietro in Vincoli
- Santo Stefano Rotondo
- Santi Giovanni e Paolo
- Santi Quattro Coronati
- Basilica di San Clemente

=== Forums ===
- Roman Forum
- Imperial fora
  - Forum of Augustus
  - Forum of Caesar
  - Forum of Nerva
  - Forum of Trajan

=== Campidoglio ===
- Capitoline Hill
- Capitoline Museums
- Cordonata

=== Other Buildings ===
- Victor Emmanuel II Monument
- Palazzo Venezia
- Palazzo Del Grillo
- Lapidario di Roma

== Connections ==
=== Bus Connections ===
The station is served by lines 51, 75, 85, 87, 117, 118, of the ATAC Bus Network. At night, the station is served by the nMB line of the bus network.

=== Tram Connections ===
The Colosseum is also connected by tram line 3 of the Rome tramway network. The tram stop is not immediately located in front of the metro station, it is located on the left side of Piazza del Colosseo.

== Gallery ==
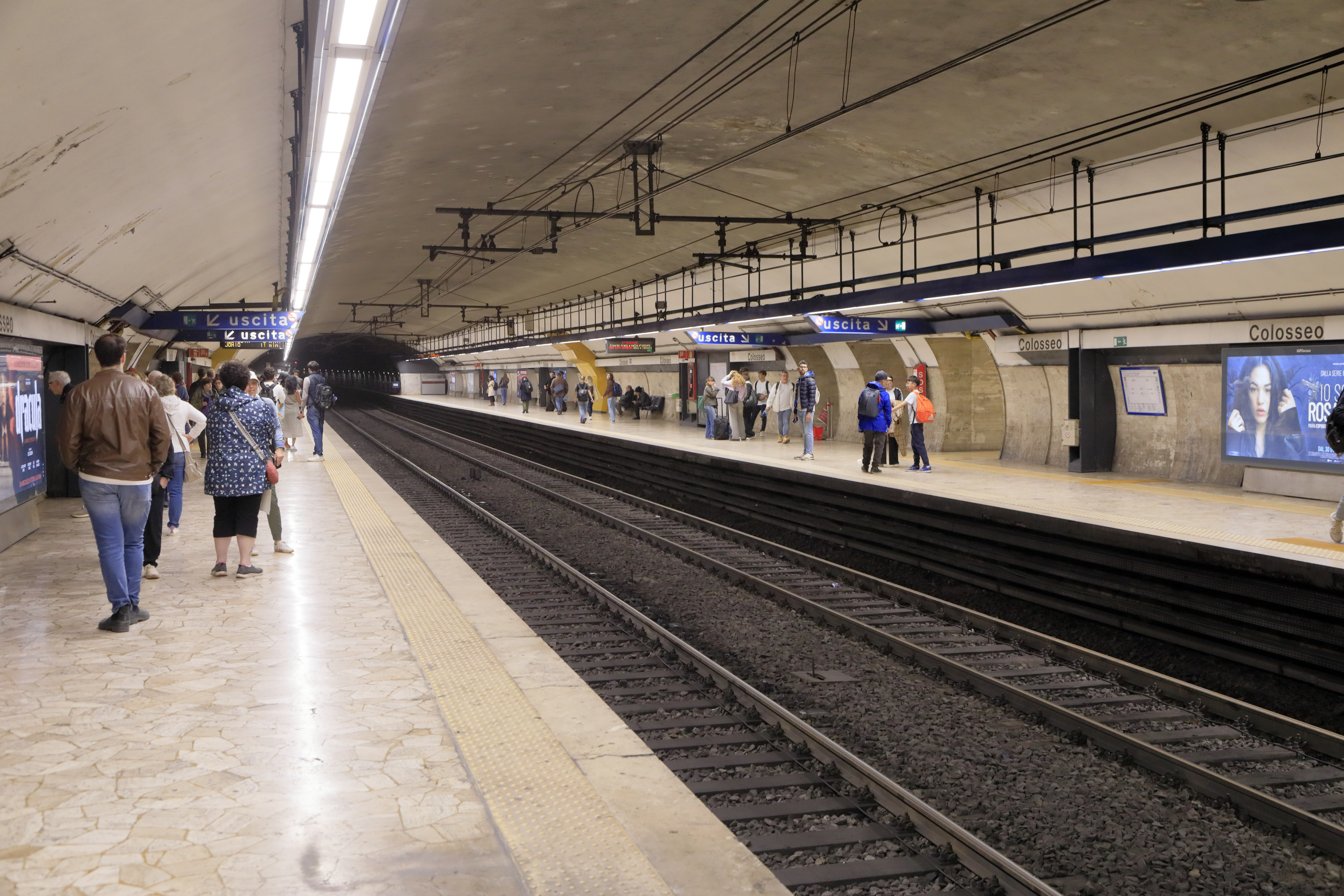
Line B platforms

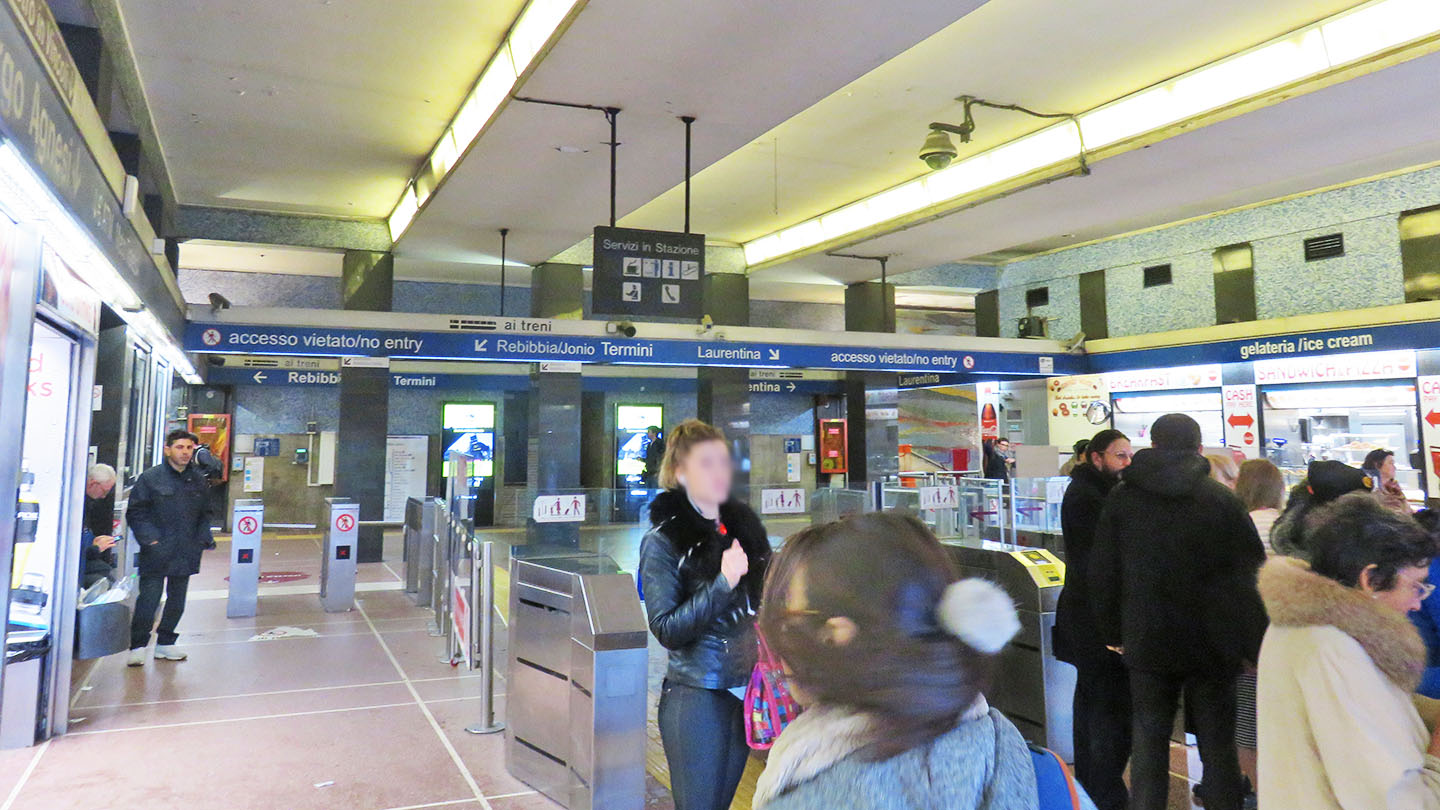
Colosseo Station's line B ticket gates

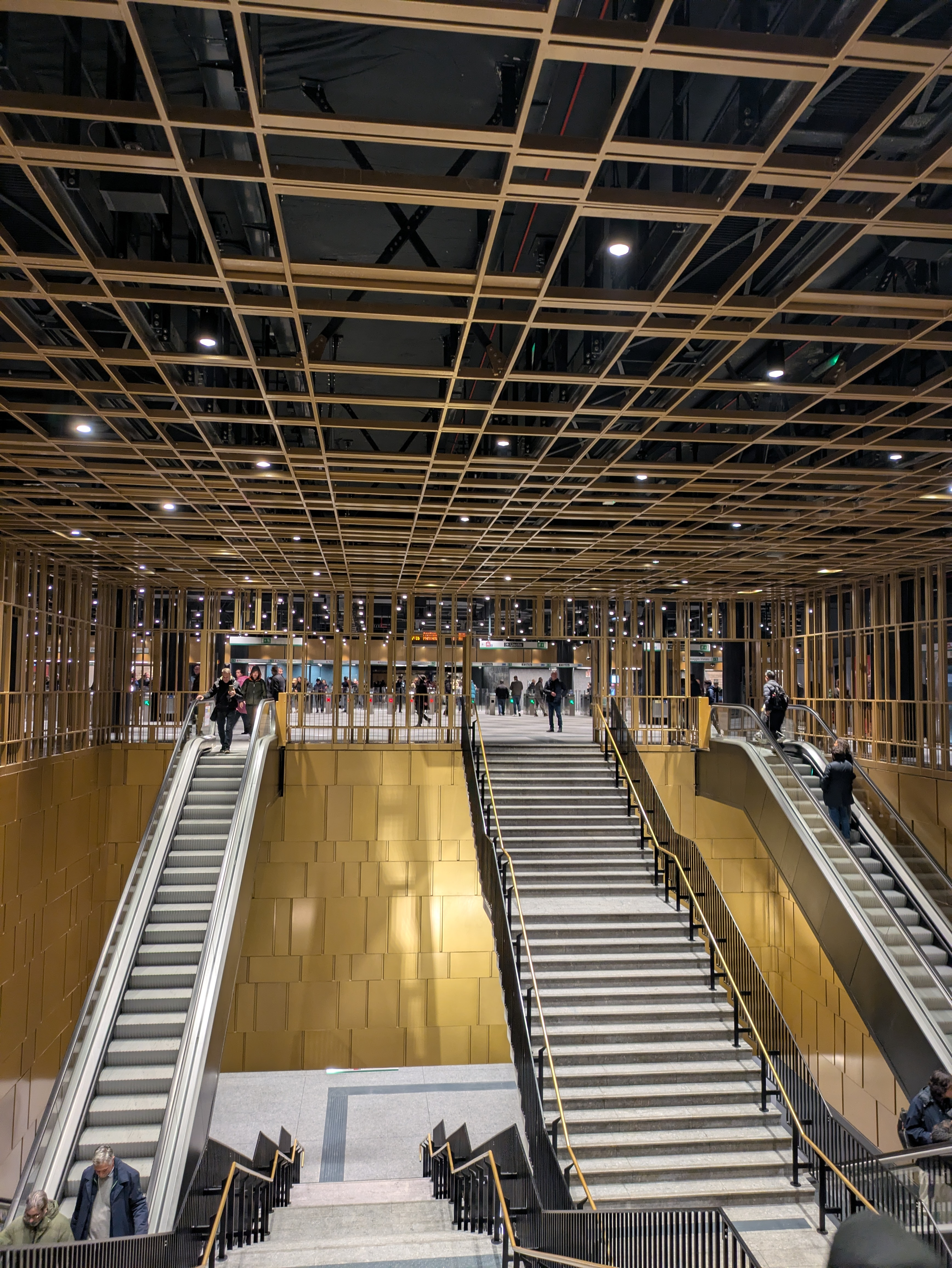
The atrium of the line C station

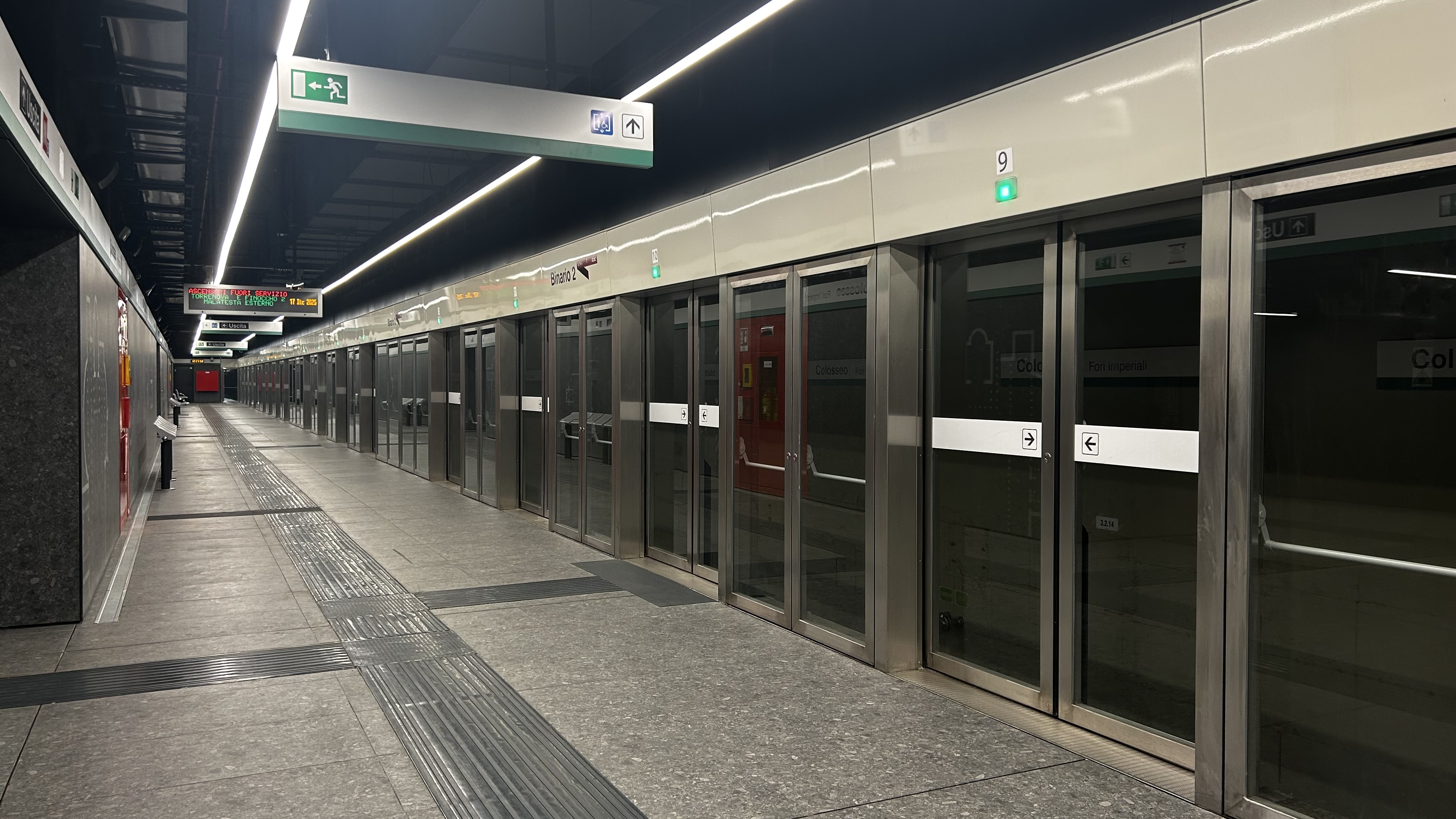
Line C platforms

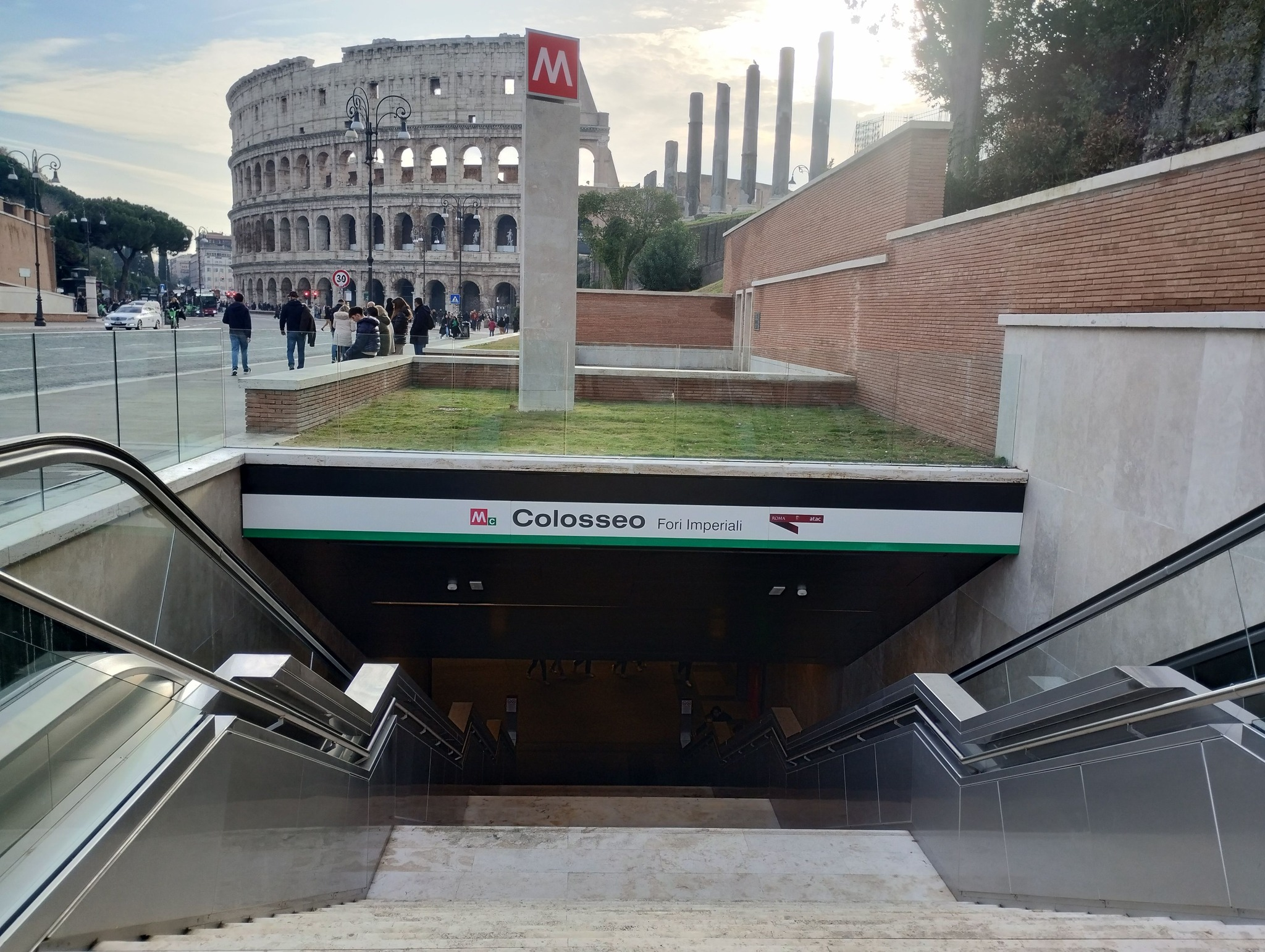
One of the entrances of the Colosseo Station from Via dei Fori Imperiali in December 2025
