= U5 (Vienna U-Bahn) =

Metro line in Vienna, Austria

U5 U-Bahn-Linie U5

Overview
- Status: Under construction
- Owner: Wiener Linien
- Locale: Vienna, Austria
- Termini: Dornbach (planned); Karlsplatz

Service
- Type: Rapid transit
- System: Vienna U-Bahn
- Operator(s): Wiener Linien

History
- Opened: 2030; 4 years' time (first section)

Technical
- Number of tracks: 2
- Character: Underground
- Track gauge: 1,435 mm (4 ft 8 1/2 in) standard gauge
- Electrification: 750 V DC third rail

Line U5 is a line of the Vienna U-Bahn network that is currently under construction. It branches off from the southern section of the U2 line, which is being separated from it and extended. The first plans for the "Linienkreuz U2/U5" expansion project, which is now being implemented, were published in 2014 and the U5 between Frankhplatz and Karlsplatz stations is scheduled to open in 2030. The line will be extended from Frankhplatz to Hernals in 2032 at the earliest and its color will be turquoise.

== History ==
=== Earlier plans ===
In 1966/67, when the basic network of the Vienna U-Bahn was planned, the designation U5 was given to a route from Hernals via Schottenring and Praterstern towards Stadion and Stadlauer Brücke - i.e. corresponding to a large part of the U2 extension opened in 2008. However, this plan was already abandoned in the early 1970s in favor of branching off other lines on the majority of this route (after the attempt with the U2/U4 line in 1981, which did not work in practice, line branching was then rejected in principle). In 1973, the designation U5 was therefore assigned to a line between Meidling Hauptstraße, the southern Gürtel and Schlachthausgasse, but this was soon abandoned, not least because it would have run parallel to the S-Bahn main line for a large part. From the commissioning of the U6 in 1989, the designation U5 represented a gap in the numbering of Vienna's subway lines.

=== Current project ===
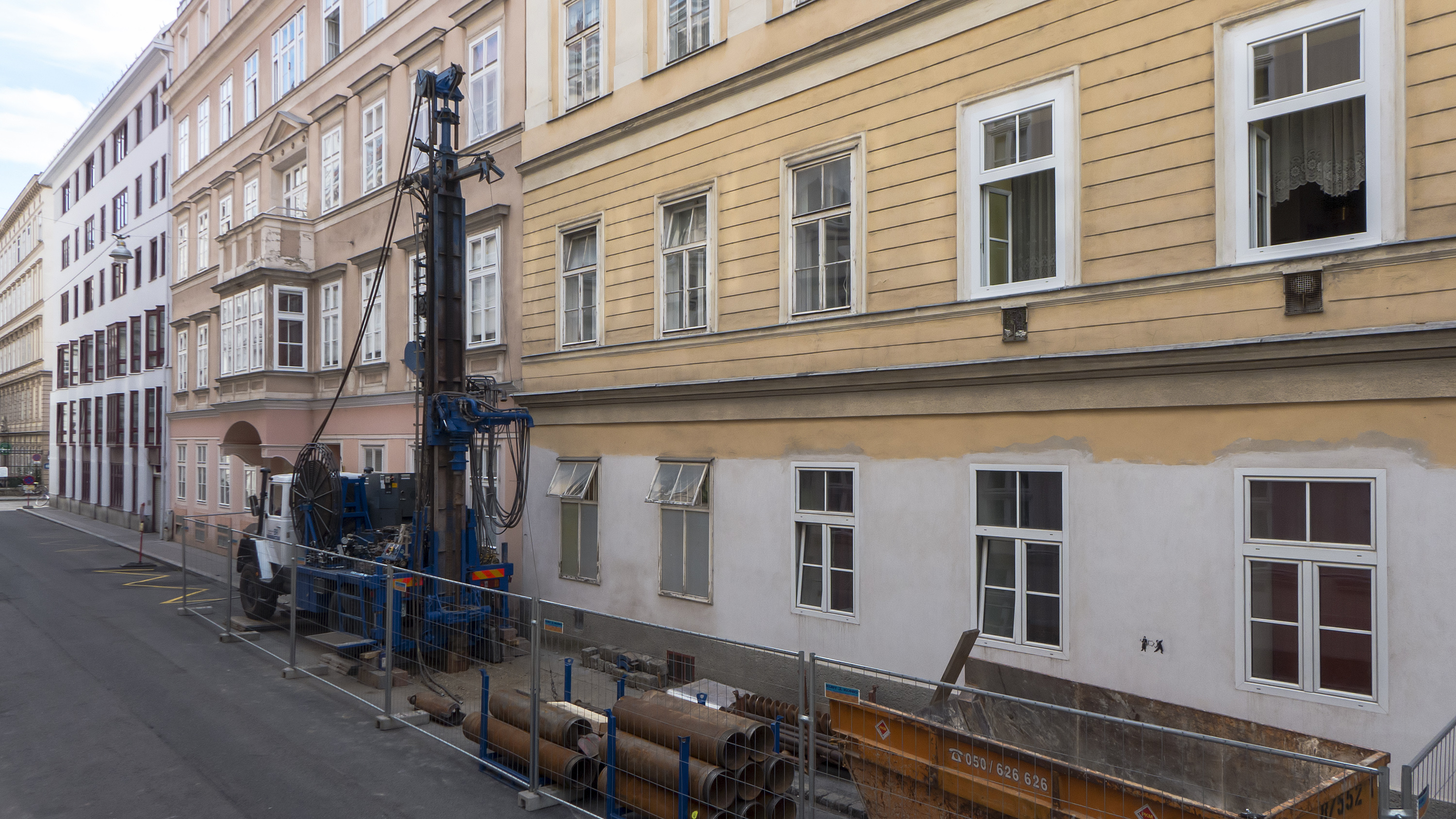
Test drilling for the U5 underground line in Beethovengasse, Alsergrund (August 2014)

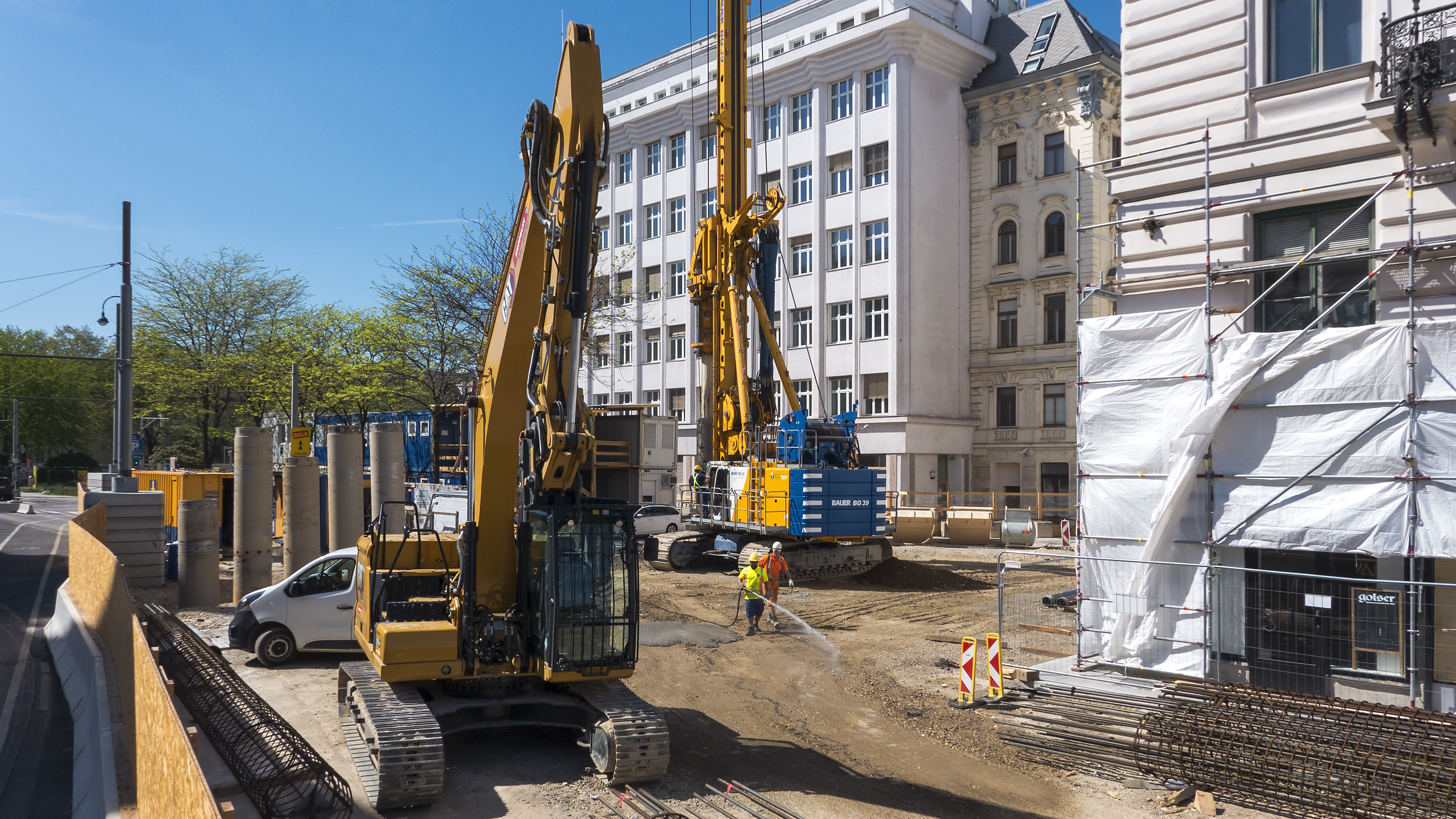
Construction work at Frankhplatz (May 2021)

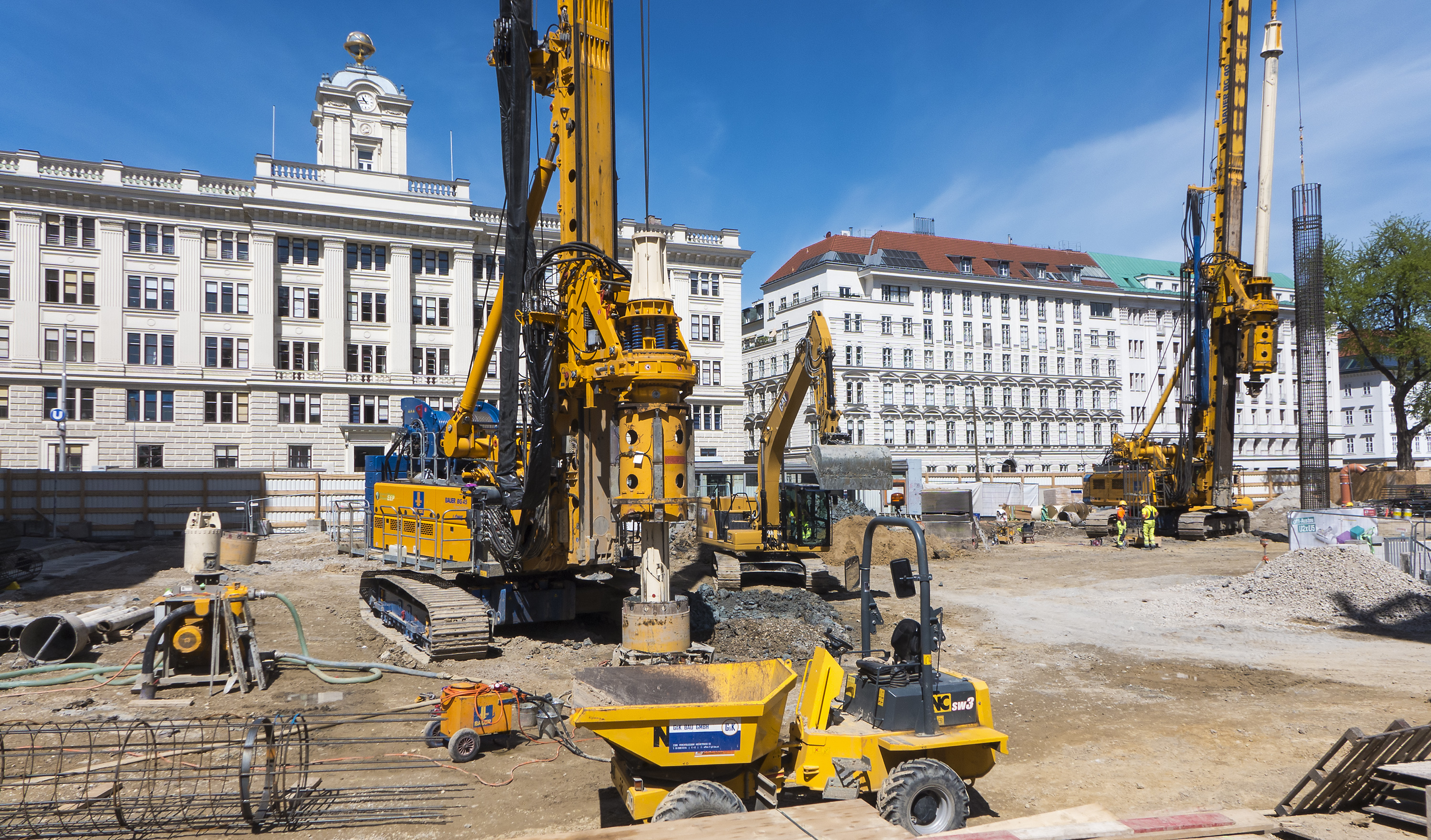
Construction work for the Rathaus station (Friedrich-Schmidt-Platz, May 2021)

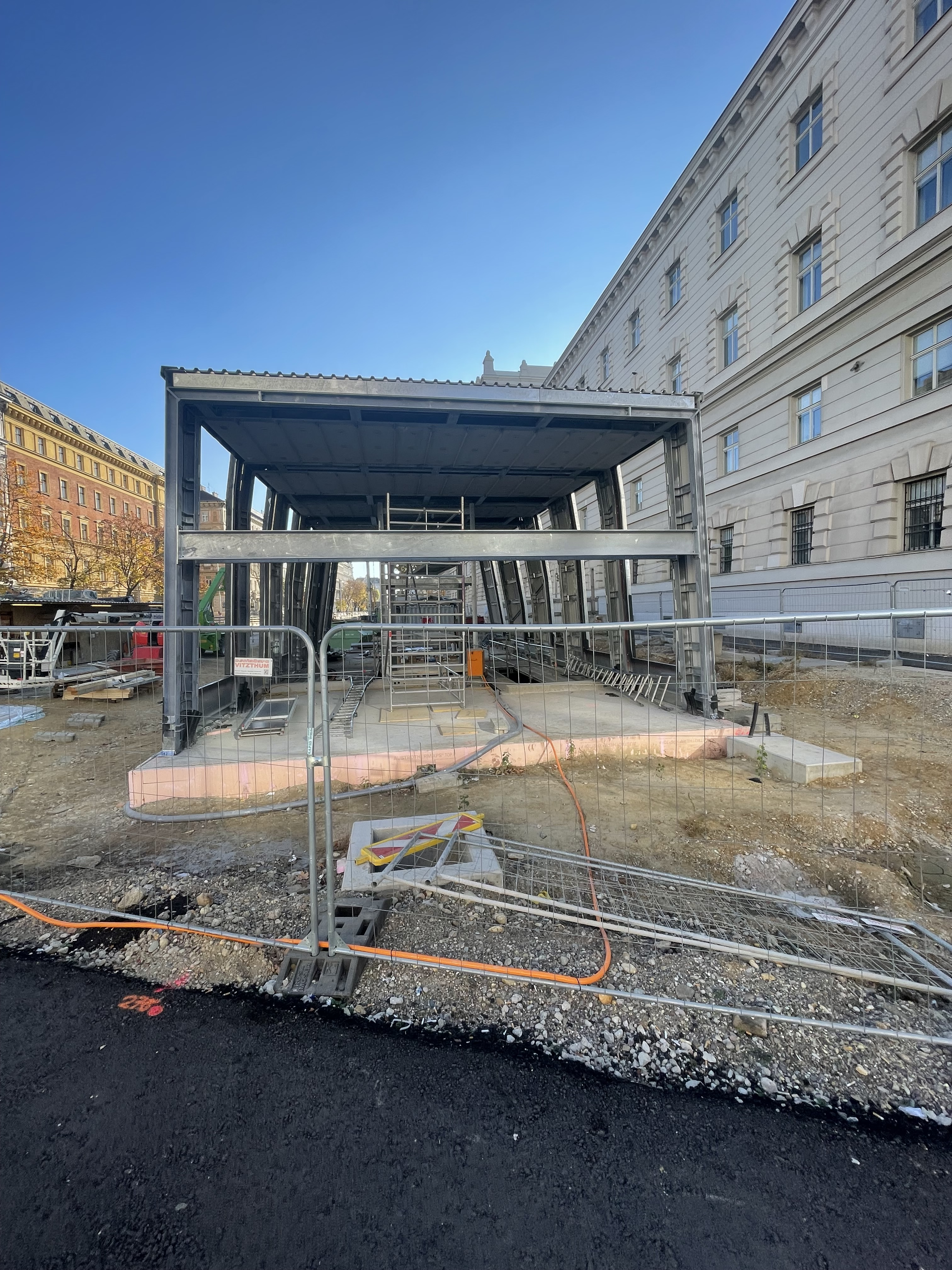
U5 construction work: new station in front of the State Court, November 2024

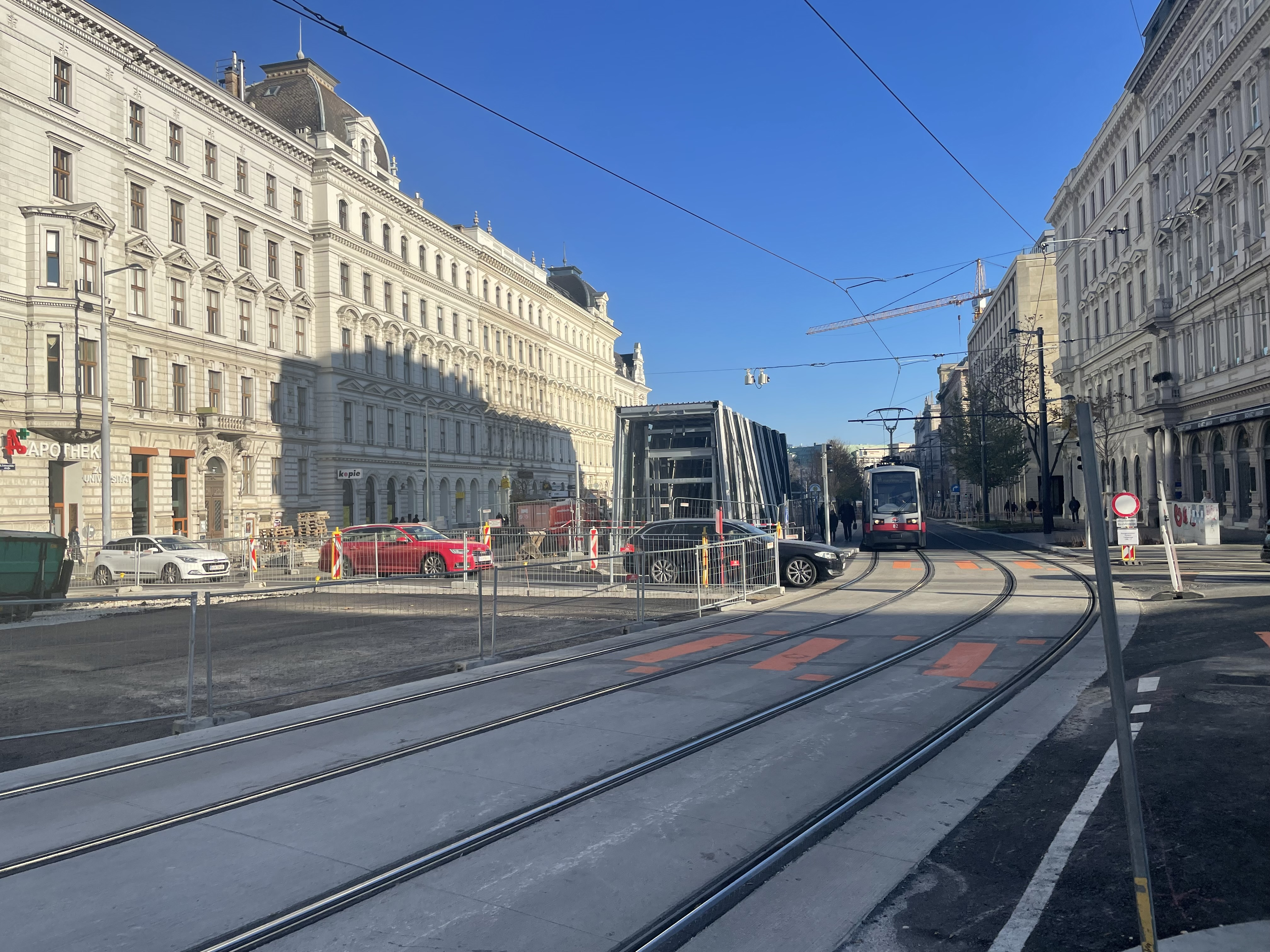
U5 construction work: new station in Universitätsstraße

On June 27, 2014, city councillors Renate Brauner and Maria Vassilakou presented the expansion project "Linienkreuz U2/U5" and the associated routing of the U5 line to the public. In the first stage, the U5 is to take over the existing Karlsplatz-Universitätsstraße section from the U2 line and then serve a new Frankhplatz station; the U2 will then be rerouted onto a new southern branch. The ground-breaking ceremony took place at Matzleinsdorfer Platz on October 8, 2018. The U5 is due to open in 2026 and will be operated together with the U2 under the Zweierlinie for a while. Subsequently, the U5 will run from Frankhplatz via Arne-Karlsson-Park (one of Vienna's largest tram hubs at the intersection of Spitalgasse and Währinger Straße), Michelbeuern, and Elterleinplatz (tram lines 9 and 43) to Hernals.

The turquoise color of the U5 was selected in an online vote in August 2014.

On June 2, 2015, Wiener Linien announced that the U5 is to become Vienna's first driverless subway line. To this end, there will be fully automatic platform screen doors in every station. In addition, following an international tender, Wiener Linien ordered new subway trains (Type X cars) from Siemens Austria, which can be used in driverless operation on the U5 and in standard semi-automatic operation on the U1, U2, U3 and U4 lines. The new trains will be manufactured in Simmering, with the bogies coming from Graz.

In November 2017, the City of Vienna announced a postponement of the start of construction and thus also the completion date by one year. One reason for the delay was the 2018 Austrian Presidency of the Council of the European Union, during which no construction was to take place on important transport routes in Vienna. In November 2018, it was announced that the construction contracts for the route from Rathaus to the future Frankhplatz U5 station and for the route from Matzleinsdorfer Platz to Neubaugasse would be put out to tender again, resulting in a further delay of one year. This meant that the U5 to Frankhplatz was due to open in 2025 and the new U2 to Matzleinsdorfer Platz in 2027.

In December 2020, city councillor Peter Hanke confirmed higher costs and later operation. The first expansion stage is set to cost around 2.1 billion euros. The first stage of the U5 line from Karlsplatz to Frankhplatz is scheduled to go into operation in 2026. The extended U2 to Matzleinsdorfer Platz should be in operation by 2028. However, as the construction sites were affected by the 2024 Central European floods, further delays were added.

=== Further expansion options ===
In the west, a continuation of the U5 to Dornbach to Güpferlingstraße would be possible. There is a connection to tram lines 2 and 10.

A possible southern extension of the U5 from Karlsplatz to Gudrunstraße was already included in the subway package presented in 2007, at that time as a new southern branch of the U2 line, but was postponed in favor of the U2/U5 interchange described above. This extension variant is considered to have been rejected due to the temporary closure of the Musikverein required for construction, the tunneling under embassies and the difficult connection to the Rennweg S-Bahn station; the Aspanggründe and Sonnwendviertel development areas, whose connection to the U-Bahn was planned, were realized without this connection.

== Architecture ==
The U5 line design was created by the two Viennese offices Franz and YF and presented to the public on July 9, 2015. Following the line designs of the U2 and U3, the design is based more on the original design of the Architektengruppe U-Bahn (AGU) used for the U1 and U4 lines and relies on the line color as a characteristic design element. The floors will be covered with granite slabs, while the walls and ceilings will be made of enameled steel sheets and aluminum panels. The most significant innovation will be the installation of platform screen doors with a view to fully automatic operation. The basic theme of their design, "accelerating and braking," is represented by colored strips of different widths along the platforms. The arrangement is intended to lead from the less bright platform areas to the brighter exits. The station entrances are made of white-coated aluminum sheeting and alternate with strips of glass that become narrower as they progress. A longitudinal diagonal bend in the construction points downwards towards the platforms.

For the time being, the Frankhplatz station will be the only newly built structure on the U5 to feature the new line design. The line branch taken over from the U2 will only be adapted in terms of line color and platform screen doors. This applies to the Rathaus, Volkstheater and Museumsquartier stations, as well as the Karlsplatz terminus, which were originally built as part of the tram tunnel.

== Criticism ==
Supporters counter that attempts to speed up tram line 43 have not worked so far. According to Wiener Linien, it is no longer possible to further decrease the intervals, as the trains would otherwise be in each other's way.

The ÖVP Vienna criticized the costs and the delay in construction. To that end, they called in the City Court of Audit in December 2020.

Contrary to the widespread opinion that there is no population growth in the western districts, all of the affected census districts between the Gürtel and the Suburban line have recorded significant increases since 2001, even in comparison to the expected capacities of the new urban expansion areas in the periphery. In Hernals alone, MA 18 (Urban Development and Planning) assumes a population growth from 50,867 (2005) to 65,589 (2035), i.e. an increase of 14,722, which will mainly take place in the Gründerzeit districts between the Gürtel and the Vorortelinie. In the census districts 1605, 1701, 1702, 1703 and 1803, through which the U5 would run between Michelbeuern and Hernals S-Bahn station, 71,551 inhabitants were registered in 2011 (2001: 61,369). By 2035, MA 50 (housing research) expects a further increase of 20,101 to a total of 91,652 inhabitants. This corresponds to the expected influx into the urban development area Seestadt Aspern, where around 20,000 people are also expected to live by around 2035, but where an infrastructure comparable to that of the Gürtel districts does not yet exist. A western branch of the U5 with stations in Michelbeuern, at Elterleinplatz and at the Hernals S-Bahn station would open up a densely populated area with almost 100,000 inhabitants in three districts. This includes some areas that have so far been neglected by urban development policy, such as the stagnating old factory and workers' residential area on both sides of Wattgasse. The variants being discussed for the southern extension of the U2 (Matzleinsdorfer Platz, Meidling station) would also lead to an upgrading of unattractive districts.
