= List of premetro systems =

This is the list of cities worldwide that have premetro systems; that is, tram or light rail systems that are, or were, intended to be converted to full rapid transit systems. This list excludes similar systems that were not designed to allow heavy rail trains at a later stage, nor full light metros.

== List ==
Location	Country	System	Year opened	Stations	System length
Vienna	Austria	Vienna pre-metro	1959	6	3.4 km (2.1 mi)
Antwerp	Belgium	Antwerp Pre-metro	1975	11	8.1 km (5.0 mi)
Brussels	Belgium	Brussels premetro	1969	15	
Charleroi	Belgium	Métro Léger de Charleroi	1976	48	33 km (21 mi)
Frankfurt	Germany	Frankfurt U-Bahn	1968	86	64.9 km (40.3 mi)
Poznań	Poland	Poznań Fast Tram	1997	8	8.1 km (5.0 mi)
Kraków	Poland	Kraków Fast Tram	2008	57	22 km (14 mi)
Szczecin	Poland	Szczecin Fast Tram	2015	4	
Volgograd	Russia	Volgograd Metrotram	1984	22	17.3 km (10.7 mi)
Gothenburg	Sweden	Gothenburg tram network	1969	5	
Zurich	Switzerland	Zurich Premetro	1986	3	2.5 km (1.6 mi)
Kyiv	Ukraine	Kyiv Light Rail	2000	7	6.7 km (4.2 mi)
Kryvyi Rih	Ukraine	Kryvyi Rih Metrotram	1986	11	17.7 km (11.0 mi)
San Francisco	United States	Muni Metro	1980	33	59.2 km (36.8 mi)
Boston	United States	MBTA Green Line	1897	65	38.1 km (23.7 mi)

== List of former premetros ==
Location	Country	System	Years	Stations	System length
Buenos Aires	Argentina	Subte de Buenos Aires (Line A)	1913-1926	—	—
Vienna	Austria	Zweierlinie - U2	1966-1980	8	3.4 km (2.1 mi)
Vienna	Austria	Line 64 - U6	1979-1995	3	0.8 km (0.50 mi)
Brussels	Belgium	Brussels Metro Line 1/5	1969-1976	—	—
Brussels	Belgium	Brussels Metro Line 2/6	1970-1988	—	—
Rio de Janeiro	Brazil	Rio de Janeiro Metro (Line 2)	1983-1998	—	—
Nuremberg	Germany	Nuremberg Metro (U1)	1970-1981	2	1.0 km (0.62 mi)
Rome	Italy	Rome Line C	2006-2008	2	—
Oslo	Norway	Oslo Metro	1928-1966	2	2.0 km (1.2 mi)
Stockholm	Sweden	Stockholm Metro	1933-1964	—	—
Boston	United States	East Boston Tunnel	1904-1924	4	1.6 km (1.0 mi)
New York	United States	Steinway Tunnel	1907	—	2.6 km (1.6 mi)

== See also ==
- History of tram and light rail transit systems by country
- List of tram and light rail transit systems
- List of town tramway systems (all-time list)
- List of metro systems
- List of suburban and commuter rail systems
- Light metro#List of light metro systems
- Premetro
