= Termini-Laziali (Rome–Giardinetti railway) =

Italian train station

Roma Laziali Termini Laziali
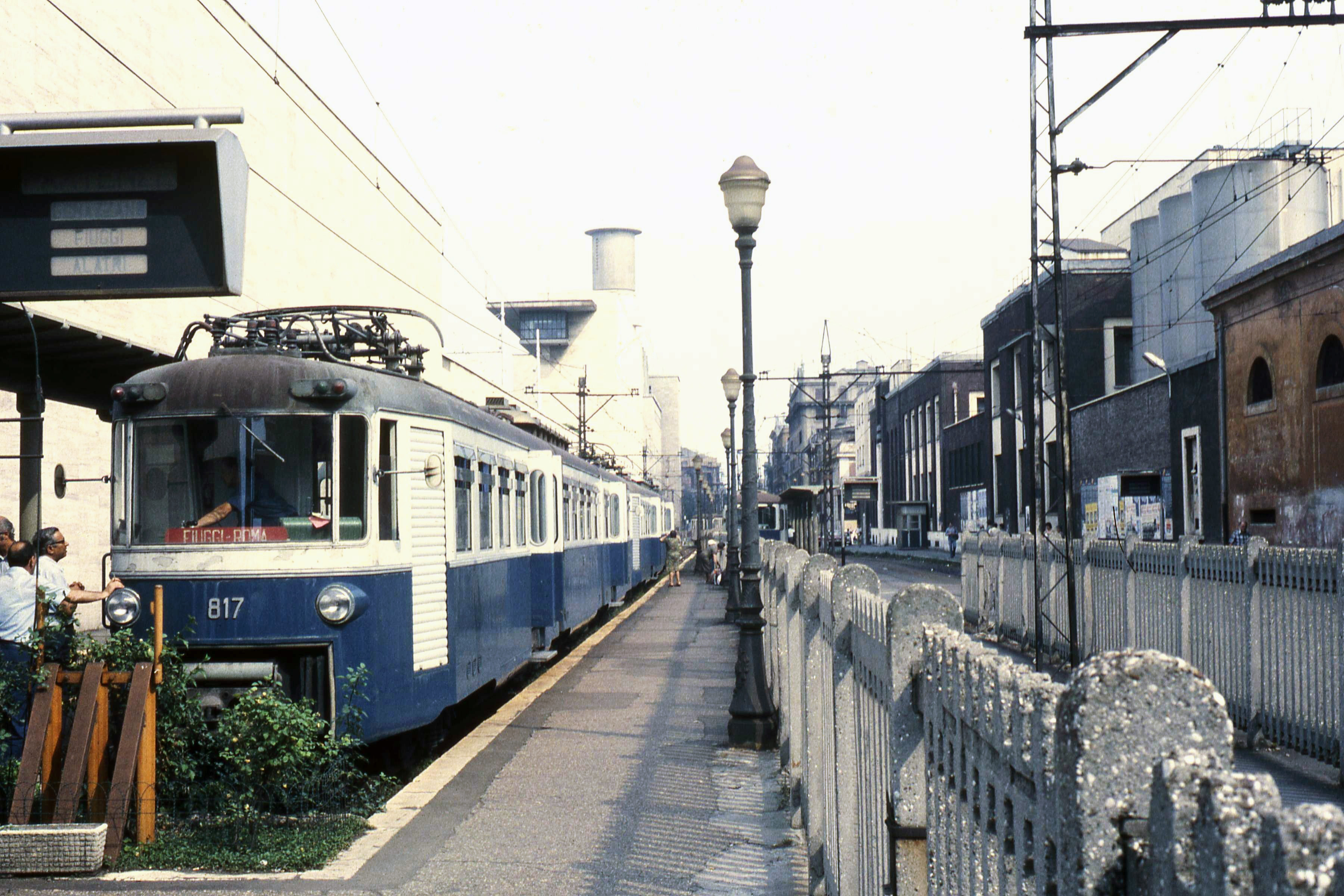
- View of the station in 1979

General information
- Location: Via Giovanni Giolitti, Rome; Italy
- System: Train station
- Owner: ATAC
- Operator: ATAC
- Line: Rome-Giardinetti railway
- Tracks: 3
- Connections: Rome Termini railway station

History
- Opened: 1950
Location

Roma Laziali is a railway station in Rome located next to the southern façade of Termini station. It is the western terminus of the Rome-Giardinetti railway.

== History ==
In 1905 the suburban tramway operator STEFER inaugurated their northern terminus on the square in front of Termini station. STEFER connected the southeastern suburbs with Rome. In 1916 the tram station was expanded in order to serve the SFV suburban tramway to the east. Until the 1920s the suburban tramways transported passengers and freight. The freight services should run towards San Lorenzo goods station, but without a direct track from the SFV line the freight services had to proceed to the terminus, shunt the locomotive and drive in the opposite direction back to San Lorenzo. This was solved with a direct track between the SFV-line and the goods station. In 1935 the gouvernor of Rome proposed a world's fair for the year 1942. In 1937 it was decided to build a new modern railway station to welcome the expected visitors as well an underground to transport this visitors between the station and the world's fair. The building of the underground station forced the tramways to leave the square and closing the tramlines was considered. In 1940 a new terminus for the tramways was opened in the Via Giolitti at the crossing with the Via Gioberti. The world's fair was canceled and the opening of the new Termini station was postponed to after World War II. At the time the new station building was opened on 20 December 1950, the terminus of the suburban tramways was relocated to the southern entrance of the new station, opposite the milk plant on the Via Mamiani, approximately 400 metres south of the original terminus. The station was decommissioned in 2026.

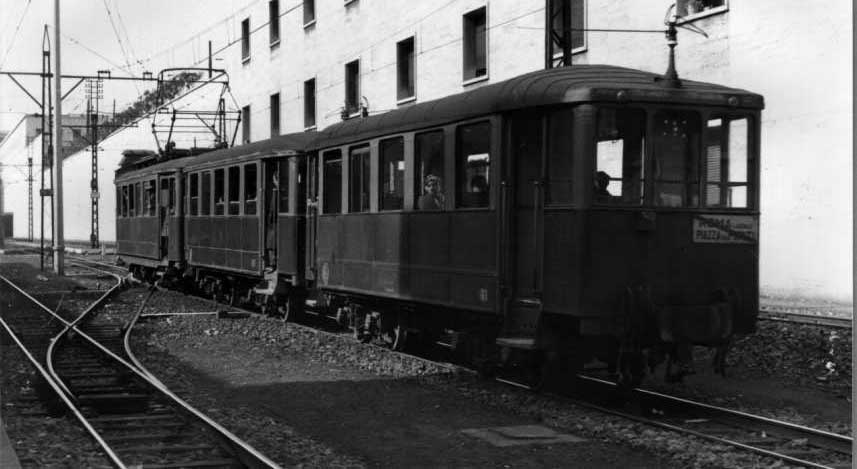
A suburban tram near the station around 1951

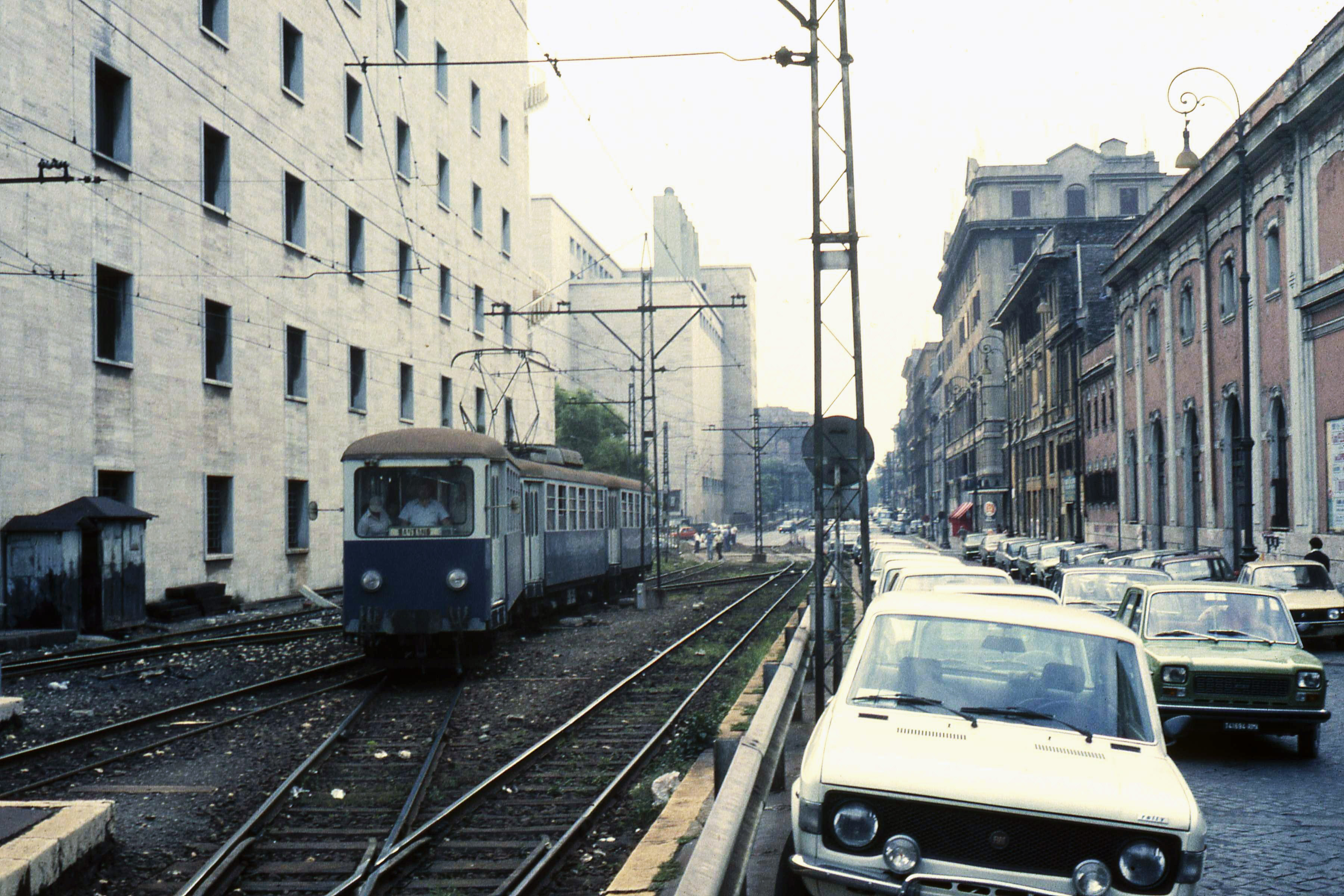
Arrival of a STEFER tram on 1 January 1979

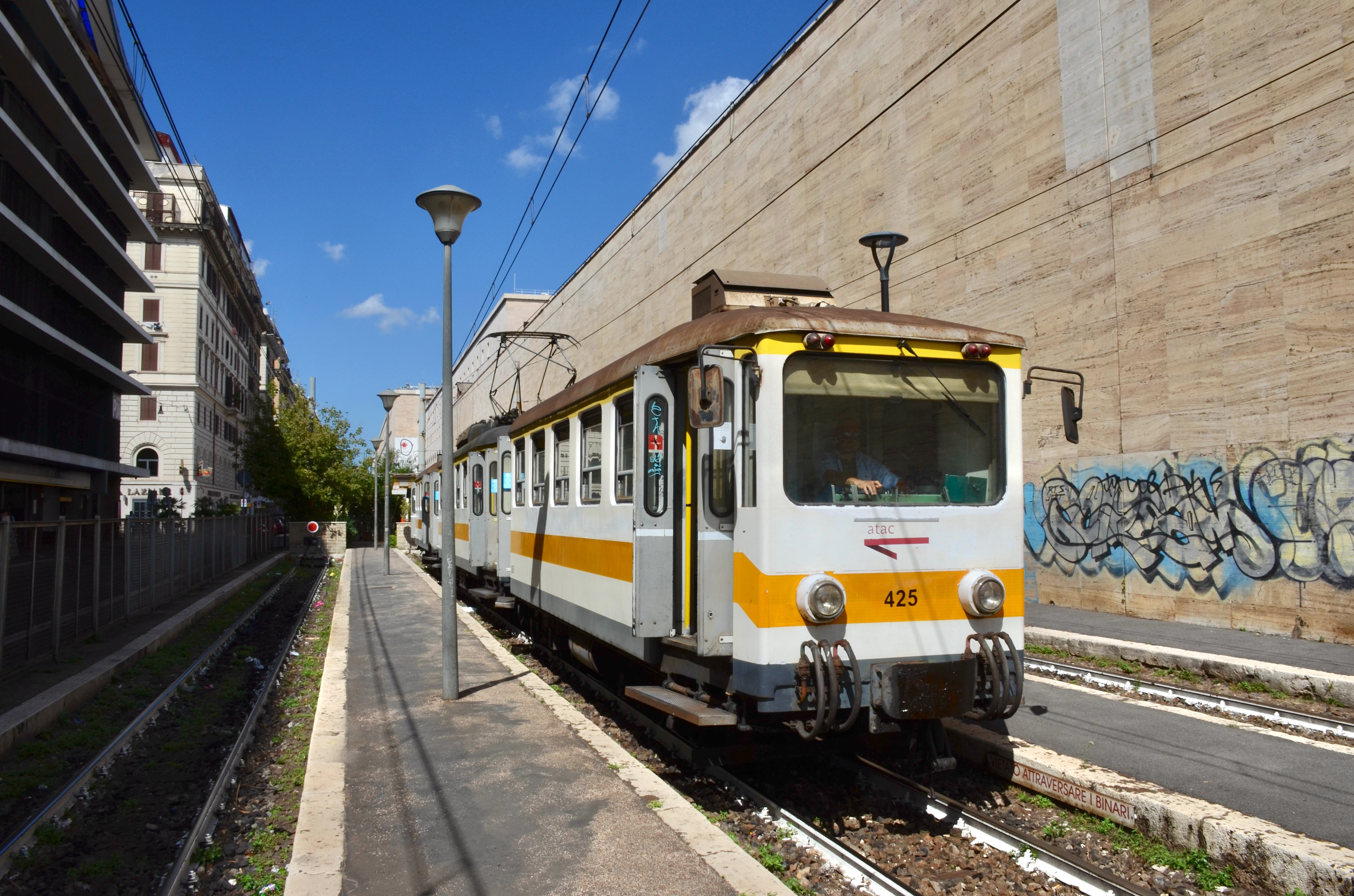
The station in 2022 with three-car train 425 (069+425+066) laying over

== Operations ==
The suburban trams used 5 tracks until 1983 when the number of tracks was reduced to 3. The two tracks next to the façade of Termini station were split in two sections with a crossover in between. These tracks were used by the SFV services to Fiuggi. The other tracks were used by the STEFER services to the southeast. STEFER's suburban tramway was replaced by underground line A on 16 February 1980. In 1983 Roma Laziali station was narrowed to 3 tracks and the Via Giolotti was improved in favour of road traffic. In 1986 the SFV was integrated in Rome's public transport after the line east of Monte Compatri-Pantano had been damaged during heavy weather and repair was ruled out. The suburban tramservice continued until 20 July 1996 when the improvement works began east of Grotte Celoni. On 26 August 1999 the line was curtailed to Giardinetti with the beginning of the improvement works outside the Grande Raccordo Anulare (GRA). As a result, the name of the line was changed in Rome–Giardinetti railway. The suburban services resumed as premetro outside the GRA on 2 October 2005. On 7 July 2008 the premetro was closed for the conversion to a real underground line. The eastern part of underground line C was opened on 9 November 2014 and on 29 June 2015 line C between Parco di Centocelle and the city centre entered service. The suburban tramservice along the via Casilina was curtailed to Centocelle on 3 August 2015, although it retained the name Roma-Giardinetti. The station was decommissioned in 2026.

== Services ==
- Automatic Ticket Machine

== Interchanges ==
- Rome Termini railway station
- Bus stop
