= Due Leoni-Fontana Candida (Rome Metro) =

Rome metro station

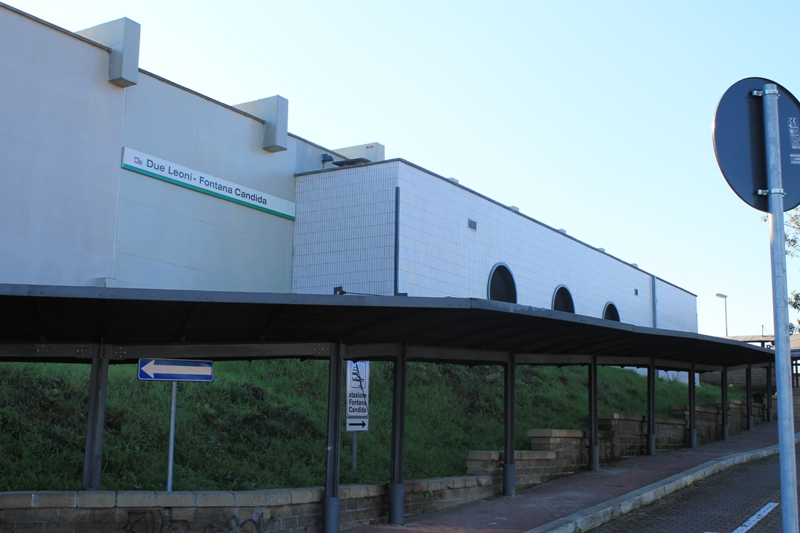

General information
- Coordinates: 41°51′54″N 12°39′29″E
- Owner: ATAC

Construction
- Structure type: at-grade
- Parking: yes

History
- Opened: 9 November 2014; 12 years ago

Services
Preceding station	Rome Metro	Following station
Grotte Celoni towards Colosseo	Line C	Borghesiana towards Monte Compatri-Pantano
Location
- Click on the map to see marker

Due Leoni-Fontana Candida is a station of Line C of the Rome Metro. It is located along the Via Casilina, on Via della Stazione Due Leoni. The previous train station of the Rome–Pantano railway line closed in 2008 and was totally rebuilt into the current Metro station; the stop was opened in November 2014.

== Nearby amenities ==
The station is in walking distance from many cafes, restaurants, and shops. Primarily a "suburban" residential area, there are two parks directly adjacent to the station, to the north and south. There is also a relatively large parking lot ("exchange car parks") immediately to the north, and connections to local buses to the south.
