= Torre Gaia (Rome Metro) =

Rome metro station

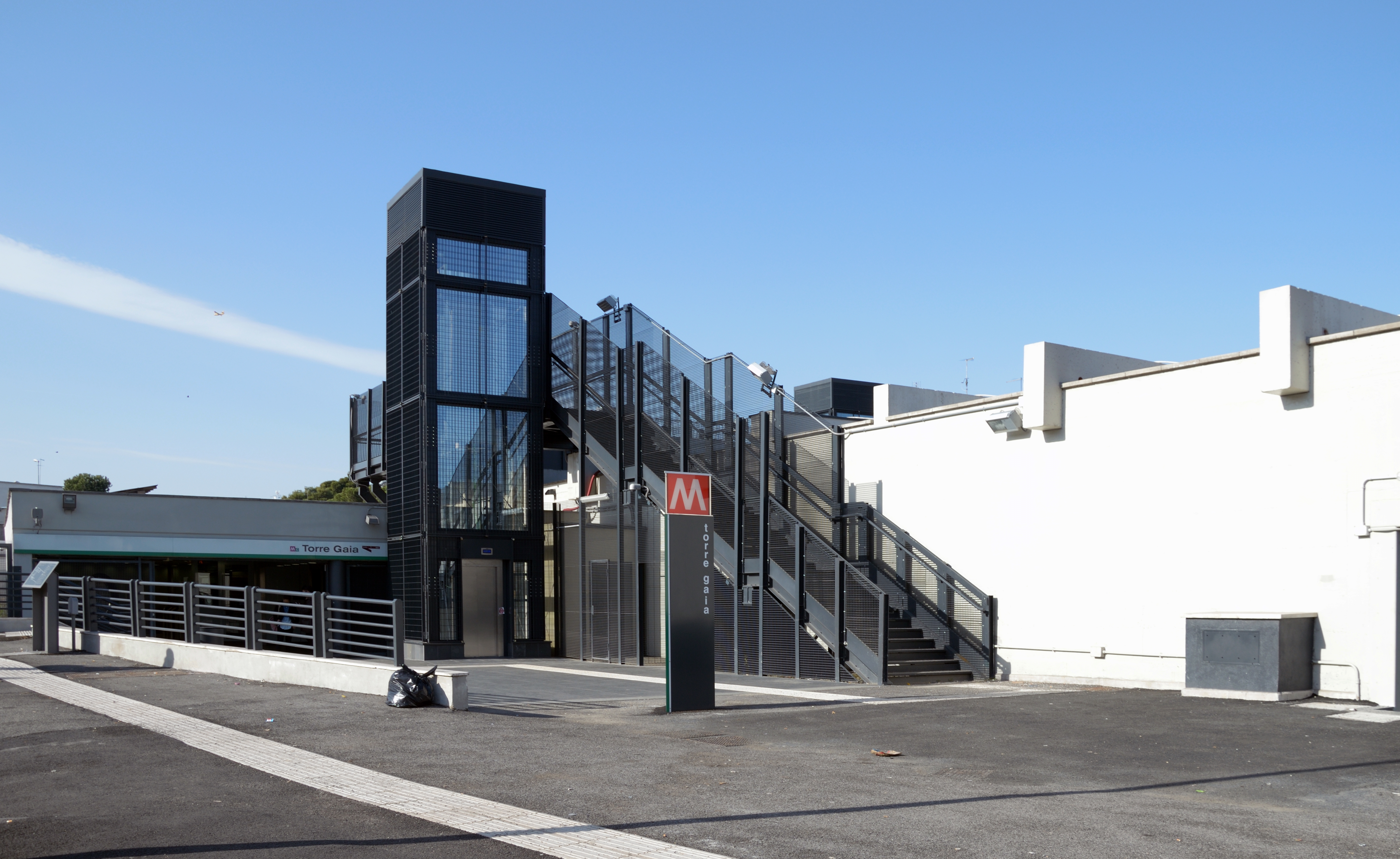

General information
- Coordinates: 41°51′51″N 12°38′08″E
- Owner: ATAC

Construction
- Structure type: at-grade

History
- Opened: 9 November 2014; 12 years ago

Services
Preceding station	Rome Metro	Following station
Torre Angela towards Colosseo	Line C	Grotte Celoni towards Monte Compatri-Pantano
Location
- Click on the map to see marker

Torre Gaia is a station of Line C of the Rome Metro. It is located along the Via Casilina and serves the Roman districts Torre Gaia and Tor Bella Monaca. The former train station of the Rome–Pantano railway line closed in 2008; the new Metro station, which opened on 9 November 2014, has been built nearby.
