= Premetro =

Type of tramway or light rail

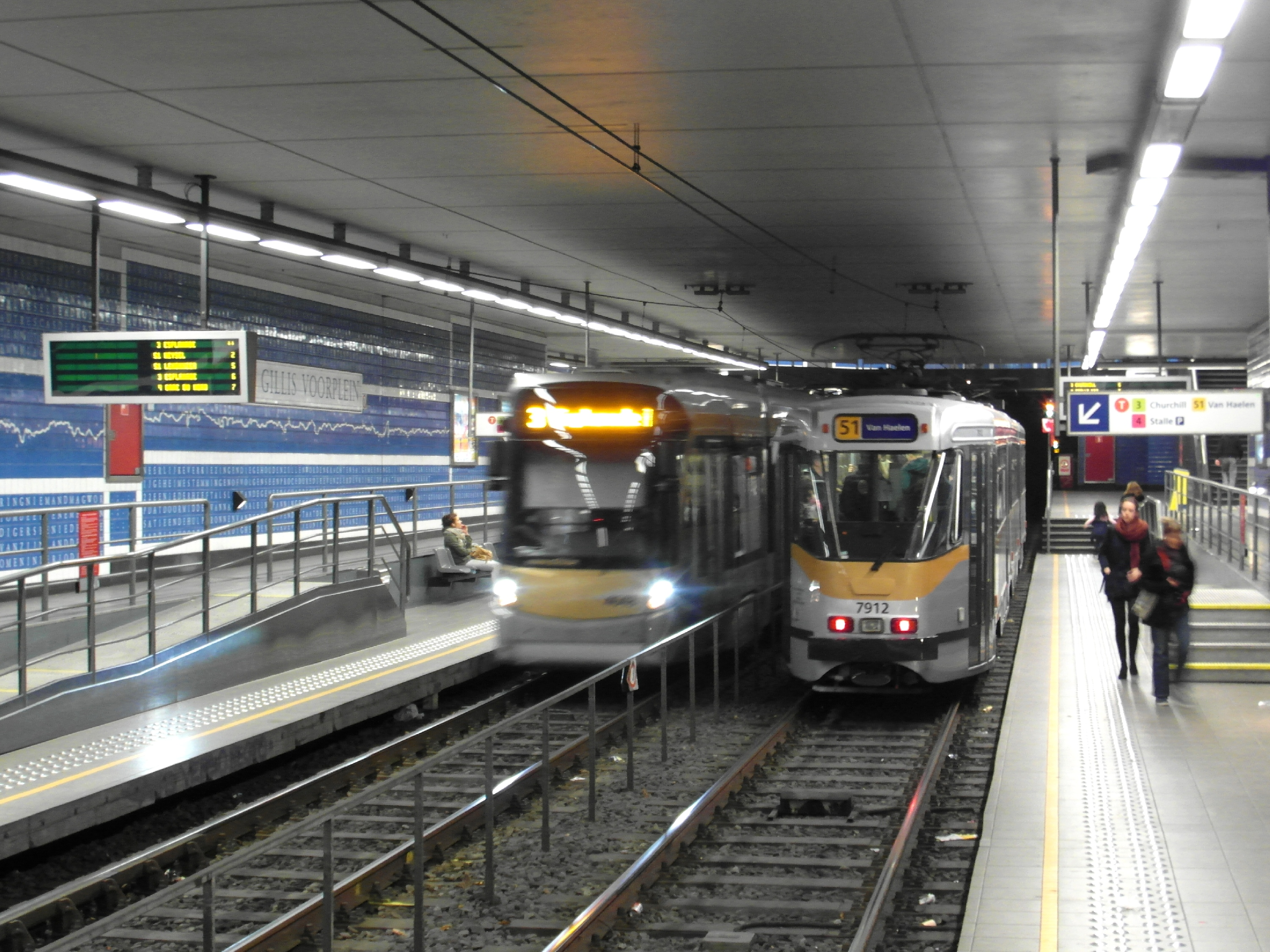
Trams at Saint-Gilles/Sint-Gillis station with partially low platforms in Brussels.

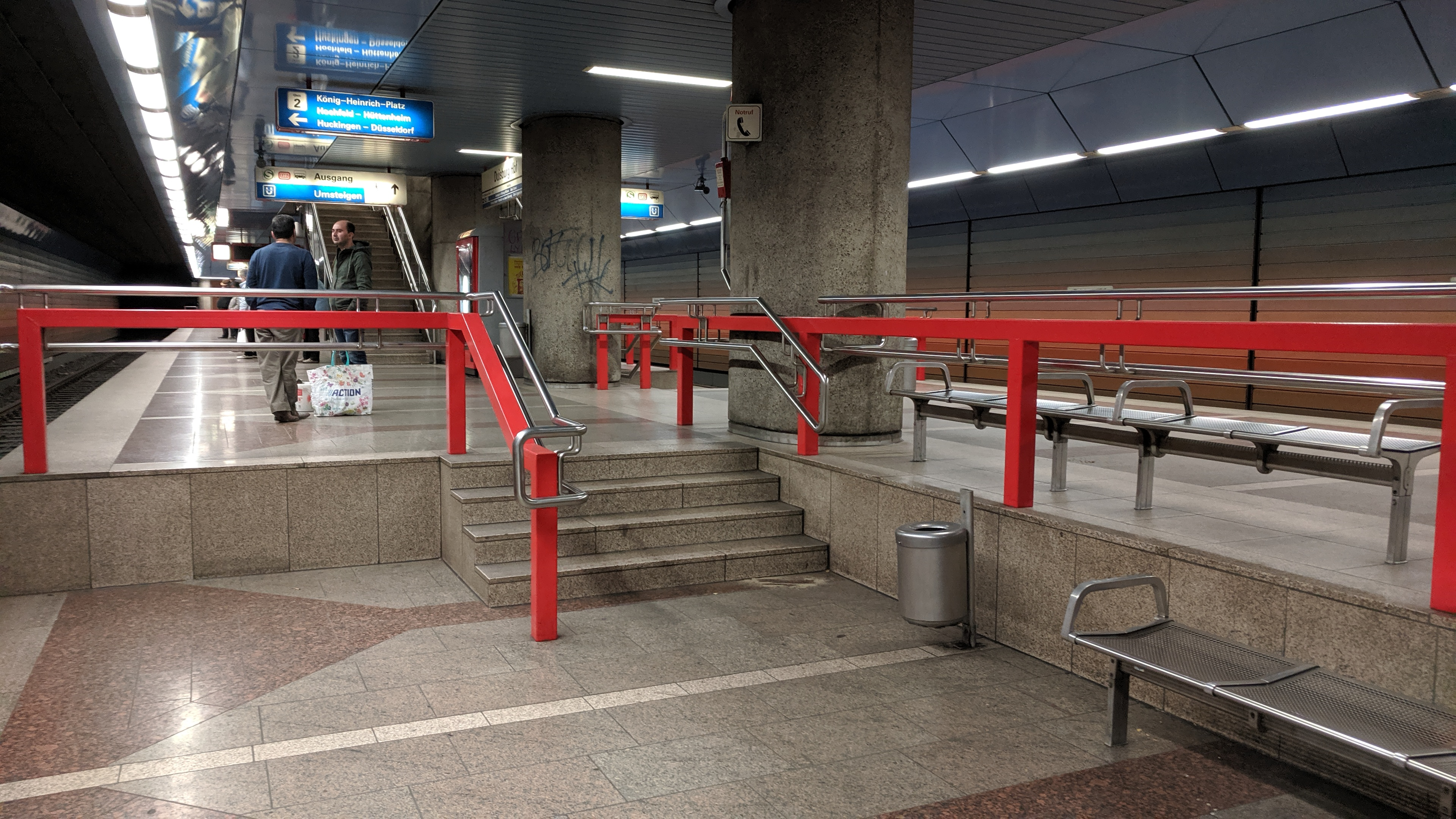
Low platform section for trams at Duisburg Hauptbahnhof Stadtbahn station.

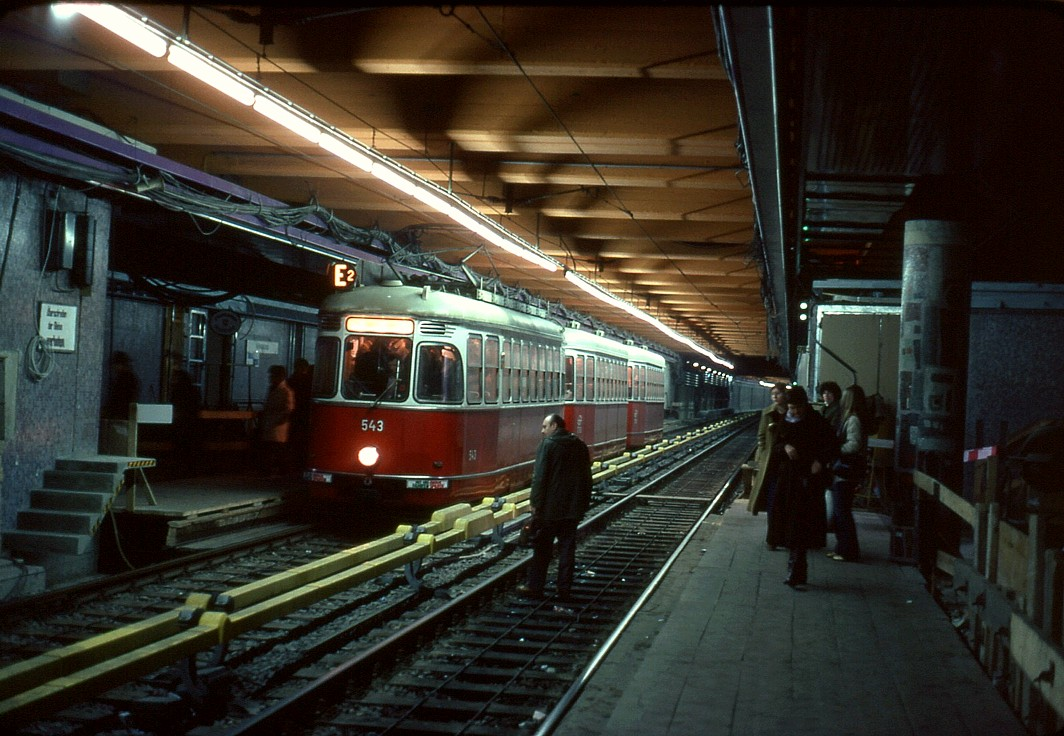
Low platform station for trams in Vienna during transformation. A third rail and emergency stairs from the future high platform have already been installed.

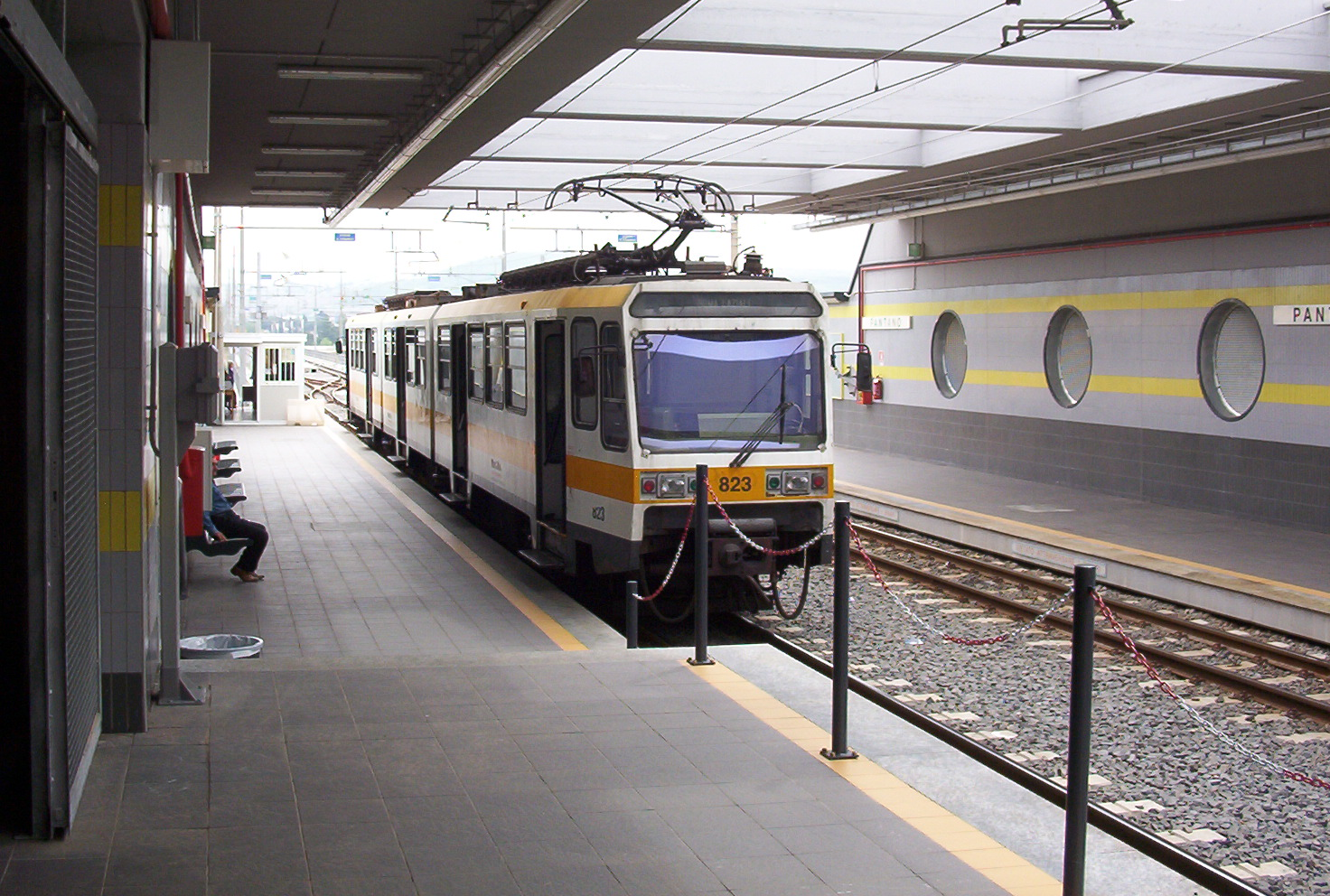
Pantano station before conversion.

Premetro (or pre-metro) is a type of light rail designed for eventual conversion to a full rapid transit (also known as a metro). These systems typically include infrastructure such as tunnels, viaducts, and dedicated rights-of-way to separate them from other traffic, built to metro standards with wider curves and gentler gradients than conventional light rail lines. However, they often include sections without full segregation, limiting immediate conversion. Premetros are usually operated with light rail vehicles or trams until an upgrade is implemented.

Several cities have referred to portions of their light rail networks as a pre-metro, including Brussels and Antwerp. Additionally, Buenos Aires has a light rail line named Premetro, however this operates as a feeder line to the metro network, and was not built with plans for conversion to full rapid transit.

== History ==
An early example of a premetro was the Tremont Street subway (1897) in Boston, today part of the MBTA Green Line. This tunnel was intended solely to reduce streetcar congestion on surface streets, not for later conversion to metro service. However between 1901 and 1908, two out of four tracks were used for rapid transit service including high platforms. Several early streetcar tunnels, including the Steinway Tunnel and East Boston Tunnel, were later converted to metro operation. However, the small loading gauge, tight curves, and steep grades of the streetcar tunnels required shorter metro cars than otherwise desirable. In 1950 Stockholm converted a 1920s tram tunnel for its first rapid transit line.

=== Second generation ===
The modern premetro concept Stadtbahn began in 1960s Germany, as rising traffic congestion due to auto ownership led to the construction of new transit systems. Rather than building costly metro lines immediately, some cities built only the downtown tunnels. They could be used by existing tram lines in the short term, with the intention of full metro conversion later - hence "pre-metro".In Brussels in the remaining premetro stations have escalators ending a few steps above the tram platforms. The idea spread to other European countries in the 1970s, especially Belgium, where such systems were explicitly named premetros. Also, one segment of Vienna's U2 metro line (Rathaus–Museumsquartier) was an underground tramway line constructed in 1966 and converted in 1980.

== Terminology ==
The use of tram vehicles in tunnels originated in the United States in the nineteenth century and was often called "subway–surface line". Later, in the second half of the twentieth century the term "semi-metro" was coined for tram systems with some sections in tunnels and on viaducts. Only when a semi-metro section is designed for later use of heavy rapid transit trains, it falls in the premetro category. The large scale report "Light Rail Transit: A State of the Art Review" describes on page 9 the relationship of premetro systems to broader terms as follows:

This step-by-step planning approach to building rail rapid transit is known as pre-metro, implying the intention to ultimately construct a fully grade separated route to be used by rail rapid transit or metro trains. Certain design features distinguish these systems from semi-metro or conventional light rail transit systems

The same distinction is made in glossaries. During the period when tram vehicles are used, the specific line falls into the light rail category.

== Examples ==
=== Previously converted lines ===
- Line 2 (Rio de Janeiro) in Brazil
- Two stations of the Rome–Fiuggi–Alatri–Frosinone railway were converted to metro standards to become part of the Rome Line C.
- Vienna premetro in Austria

=== Lines being converted ===
- Brussels Pre-metro in Belgium

=== Lines without plans to be converted ===
- Antwerp Pre-metro in Belgium
- Kryvyi Rih Metrotram in Ukraine

== See also ==
- Medium-capacity rail system
- Train categories in Europe
