= Borghesiana (Rome Metro) =

Rome metro station

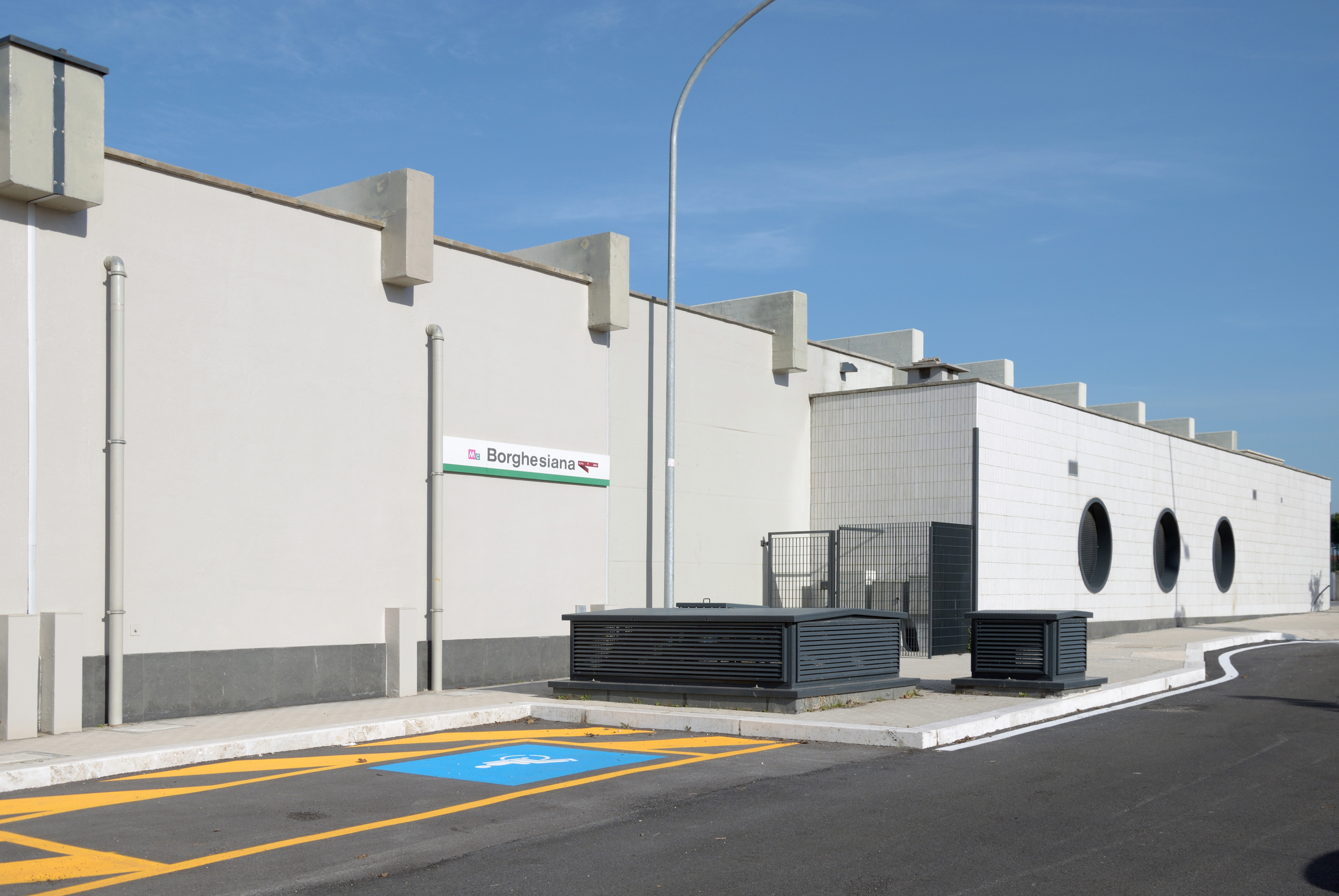

General information
- Coordinates: 41°51′53″N 12°40′02″E
- Owner: ATAC

Construction
- Structure type: at-grade
- Parking: yes

History
- Opened: 9 November 2014; 12 years ago

Services
Preceding station	Rome Metro	Following station
Due Leoni-Fontana Candida towards Colosseo	Line C	Bolognetta towards Monte Compatri-Pantano
Location
- Click on the map to see marker

Borghesiana is a station of Line C of the Rome Metro. It is located between the Via Casilina and Via Biancavilla, in the Roman district of Borghesiana.

The station used to be part of the Rome-Pantano railway line until the old station was closed in 2008 so as to be transformed into a Metro stop. It re-opened on 9 November 2014.

There were technical problems at the Metro stop in December 2021 that caused a temporary closure.

== Nearby amenities ==
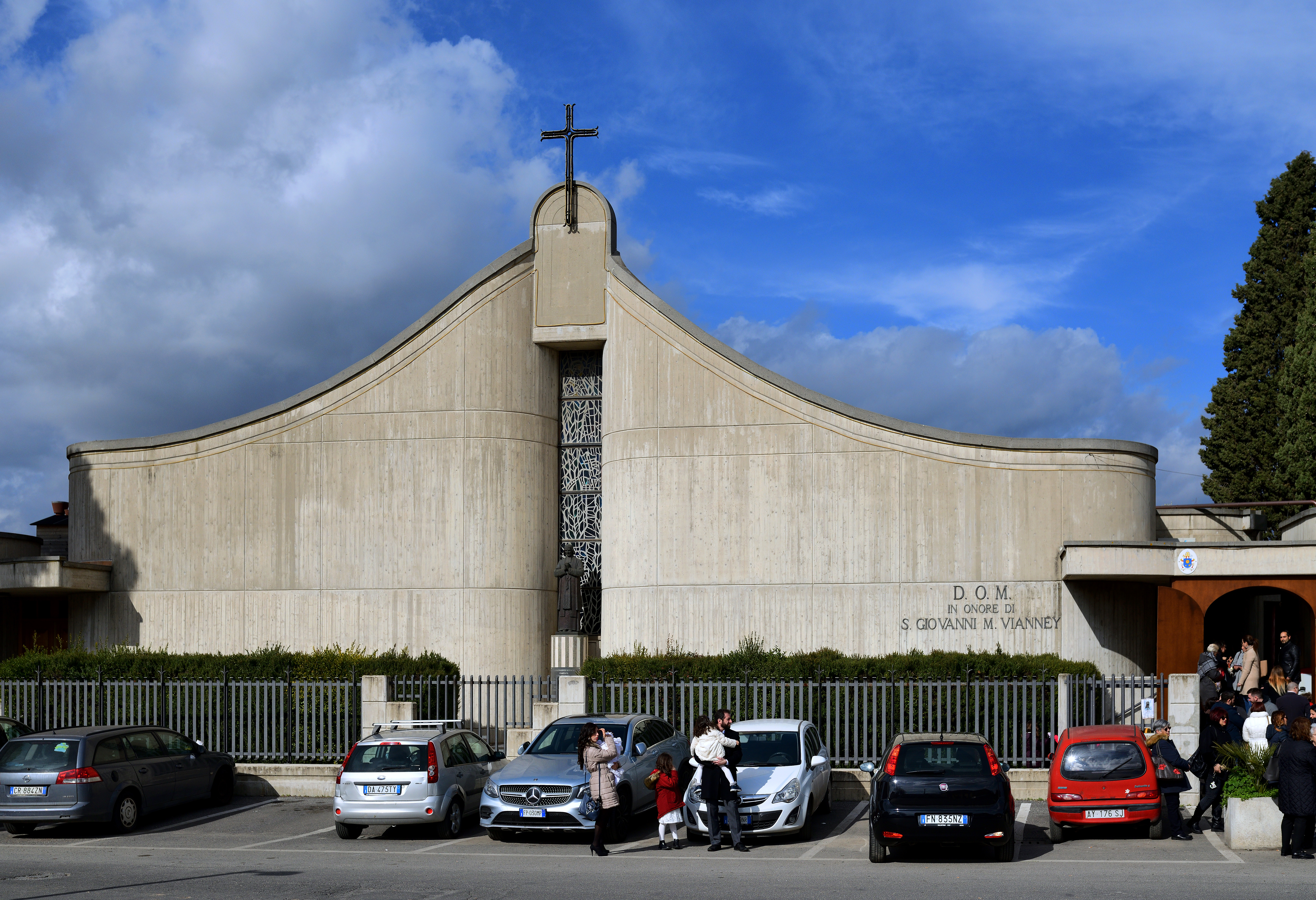
Facade of the church of St. John Mary Vianney in Borghesiana

The station is in walking distance from many cafes, restaurants, and shops. Primarily a "suburban" residential area, the main site is the modernist church of Saint John Mary Vianney.
