= Bolognetta (Rome Metro) =

Rome metro station

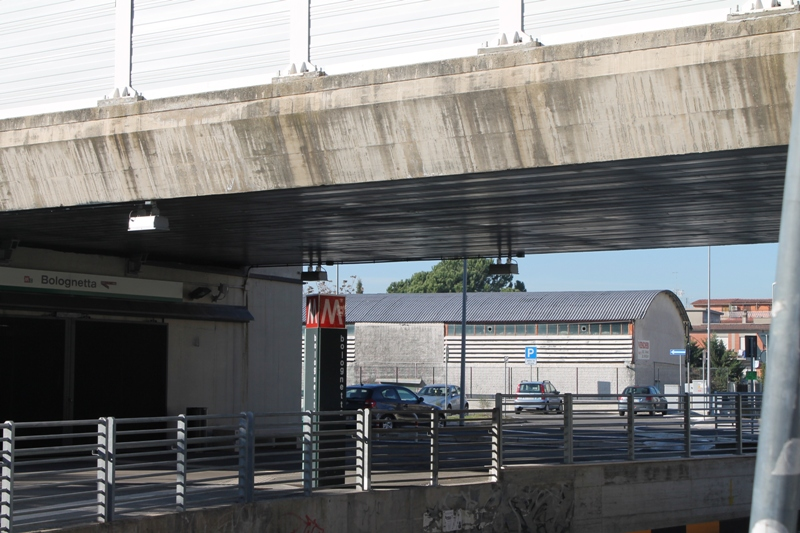

General information
- Coordinates: 41°51′54″N 12°40′51″E
- Owner: ATAC

Construction
- Structure type: elevated

History
- Opened: 9 November 2014; 12 years ago

Services
Preceding station	Rome Metro	Following station
Borghesiana towards Colosseo	Line C	Finocchio towards Monte Compatri-Pantano
Location
- Click on the map to see marker

Bolognetta is a stop on Line C of the Rome Metro. It is located at the junction of Via Bolognetta and Via Motta Camastra, in the Roman frazione of Borgata Finocchio.

It was originally built in 1916 as apart of the Roma-Fiuggi railway before being converted to a station of the Roma-Pantano railway in the 1980s before finally being closed in 2008 and being reopened in 2014 as apart of the Line C of Rome’s Metro network
