= Grotte Celoni (Rome Metro) =

Rome metro station

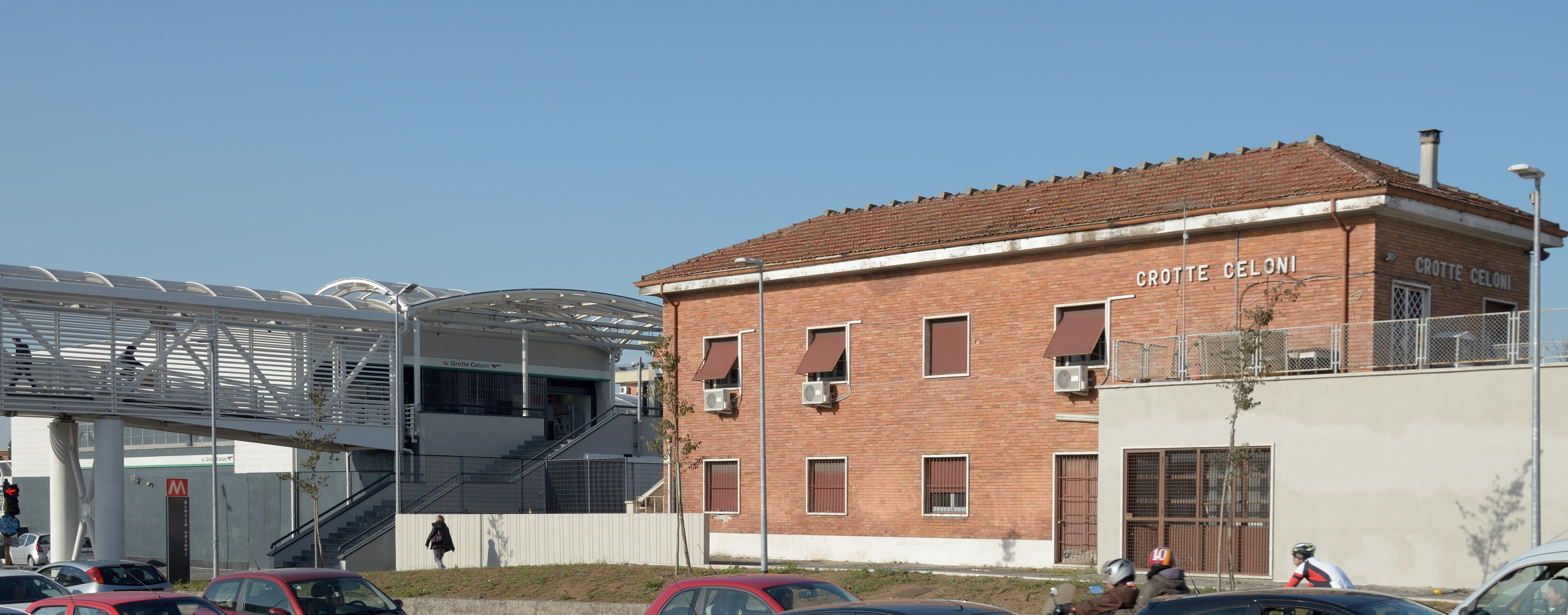

General information
- Coordinates: 41°51′46″N 12°38′46″E
- Owner: ATAC

Construction
- Structure type: at-grade
- Parking: yes

History
- Opened: 9 November 2014; 12 years ago

Services
| Preceding station | Rome Metro | Following station |
|---|---|---|
| Torre Gaia towards Colosseo | Line C | Due Leoni-Fontana Candida towards Monte Compatri-Pantano |
Location
- Click on the map to see marker

Grotte Celoni is a station of Line C of the Rome Metro. It is located along the Via Casilina in the Roman district of Grotte Celoni, but it also serves the districts of Tor Bella Monaca and Villaggio Breda. The previous train station of the Rome–Pantano railway line closed in 2008 as part of the renovation and modernisation programme; it was re-opened in November 2014 as part of Line C.

== Nearby amenities ==
The station is in walking distance from many cafes, restaurants, and shops, especially along via Acqueroni, as well as the church of Saint Rita, a parish of Augustinian tradition.

Primarily a "suburban" residential area, there is a large car parking lot and bus stop for buses 051 and 560, connected across via Casellini to the south.
