= Vienna Underground Tram =

- U-Straßenbahn Wien
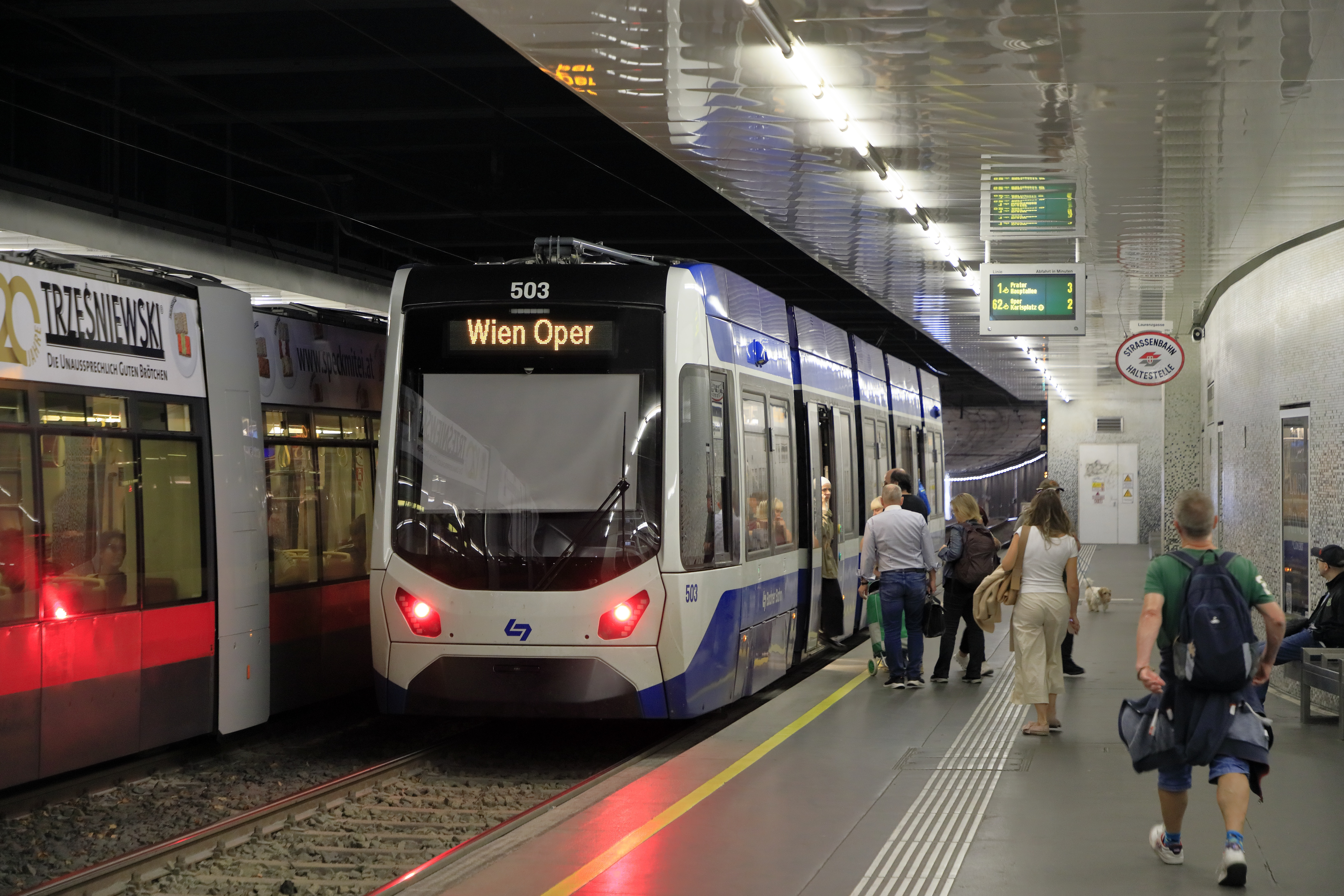
- WLB tram at Laurenzgasse station

Operation
- Locale: Vienna, Austria
- Open: 1959
- Status: Operational
- Operator: Wiener Linien

The Vienna Underground Tram (German: U-Straßenbahn Wien) or Vienna premetro refers to tunneled sections of the Vienna tram network constructed during the 1960s and 1970s.

These sections allowed trams to bypass congested surface traffic and were designed with the possibility of future conversion to full metro lines in mind. Some sections have the same function to bypass other traffic, but were not designed for conversion to U-bahn service. The tunnels, along with one viaduct, are maintained and operated by Wiener Linien, the main public transport operator in Vienna.

Two of the total five grade-separated sections are several kilometres long. One major section, the Zweierlinie, opened in 1966, was converted into the Vienna U-Bahn system and opened as such in 1980. Additionally, the Gürtel tunnel is also used by the Wiener Lokalbahnen (WLB), which operates a regional tram-train service. Located along the southern Gürtel (belt road), this section opened on 11 January 1969 and remains in operation as an underground tramway tunnel.

The tunnel sections are known in German as Unterpflasterstraßenbahn (literally "under-pavement tramway") or Untergrundstraßenbahn ("underground tramway") and are sometimes abbreviated as UStrab.

== Lines converted to full metro ==
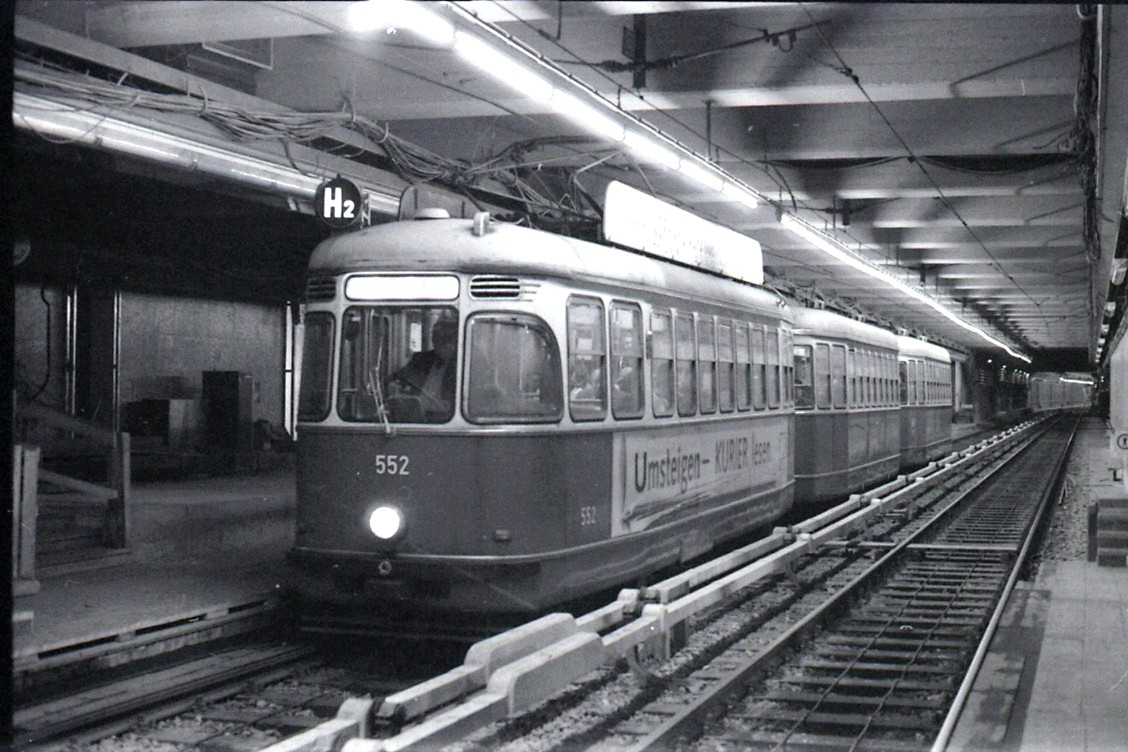
Pre-metro to U-Bahn reconstruction, 1980

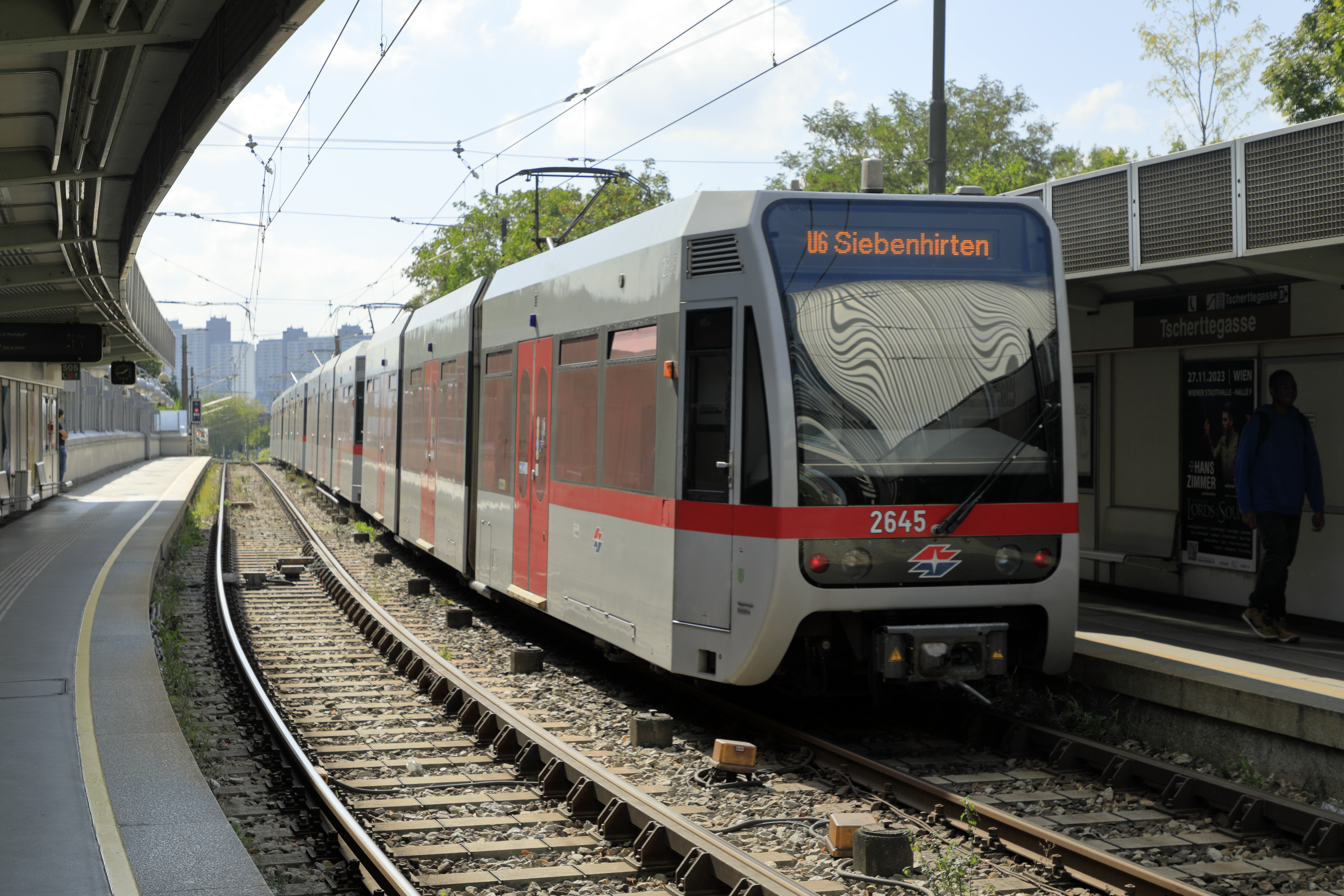
Former pre-metro station Tscherttegasse.

=== Zweierlinie ===
This pre-metro infrastructure was opened to tram traffic in 1966 and extended two times in the following years. In 1980, the complete section was converted to U-Bahn line U2 within two summer months, in which the tram traffic was suspended on the underground lines. The platforms were raised, the architecture of the underground tram stations was largely maintained. Since the opening of the U2 on 30 August 1980, the route is used by the U-Bahn only.

This pre-metro tunnel had a length of 1.8 km and four underground stations:

- Mariahilfer Straße, in 1991 until 2000 renamed to Babenbergerstraße, again renamed in 2000 to Museumsquartier
- Burggasse, today U-Bahn station Volkstheater and connection with U-Bahn line U3
- Lerchenfelder Straße, closed in September 2003, because of the short distance to the Volkstheater station
- Friedrich Schmidt-Platz, today U-Bahn station Rathaus (city hall); north of this station the exit of the tunnel was located at Landesgerichtsstraße

=== Alterlaa ===
The pre-metro stations Alterlaa and Tscherttegasse were part of a pre-metro section with five stations, completed in 1979. The section was used by tramline 64. During partial conversion for the U6 that finished in 1995, the two elevated stations were adjusted.

== Lines in operation ==
=== Gürtel ===
The tunnels and stations of this pre-metro section are still in operation. The first section, a short underpass of the Südtiroler Platz near the former Südbahnhof railway station, which had been in operation until 2009, was opened on May 7, 1959. This station is directly connected to Wien Hauptbahnhof, and is an interchange station to the U-Bahn and the S-Bahn (regional rapid transit).

The extension was opened in January 1969 and the entire tunnel has a length of 3.4 kilometers. As part of the construction work a historic church, the Florianikirche, has been demolished. It was planned to convert this in pre-metro style to a full U-Bahn line U5 from Gumpendorfer Straße to St. Marx, but this plan has never been seriously pursued. Due to level crossings at two stations, the tunnel can't be transformed into heavy metro anymore, as the Vienna U-bahn requires grade separation. As part of the construction of the Matzleinsdorfer Platz station, Vienna's first moving walkway opened.

The pre-metro section under the Gürtel comprises a total of six underground stations and is used by four tram lines and the Wiener Lokalbahn service. Tram line 18 runs the longest section of the underground tram tunnel, and tram line 6 the shortest.

Starting in 2009, all pre-metro stations, which were built in the 1960s, were refurbished, whereby the station design was aligned as far as possible with that of the U-Bahn. On December 9, 2012, the Südtiroler Platz station was renamed to Hauptbahnhof (German for Central Station). In contrast to the other stations of the Gürtel pre-metro, white wall coverings were mounted during the renovation of this station, as well as (in a different position) a large mural (an oblique view of Vienna) from the original equipment from 1959.

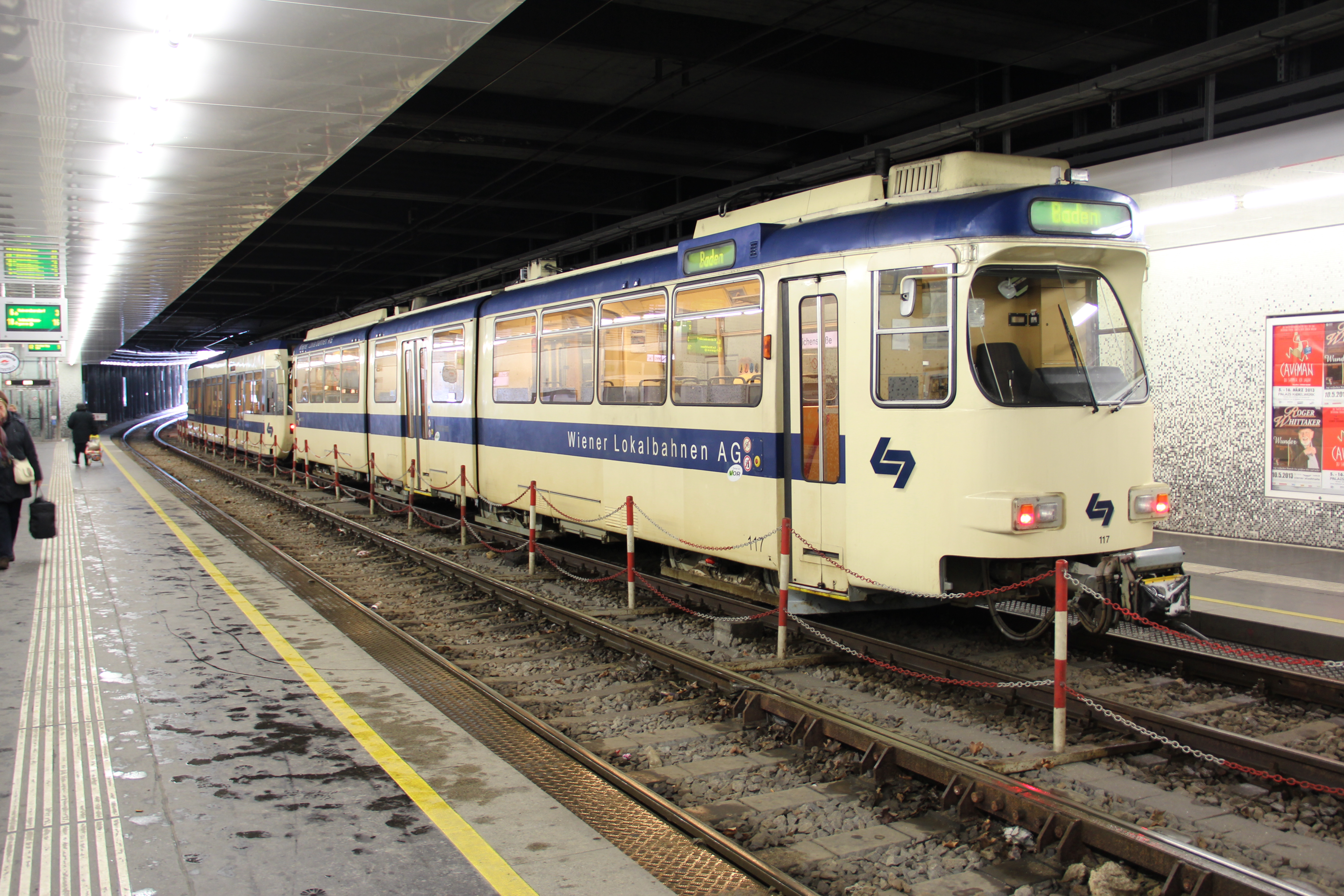
Vienna Tram Train at Eichenstraße station

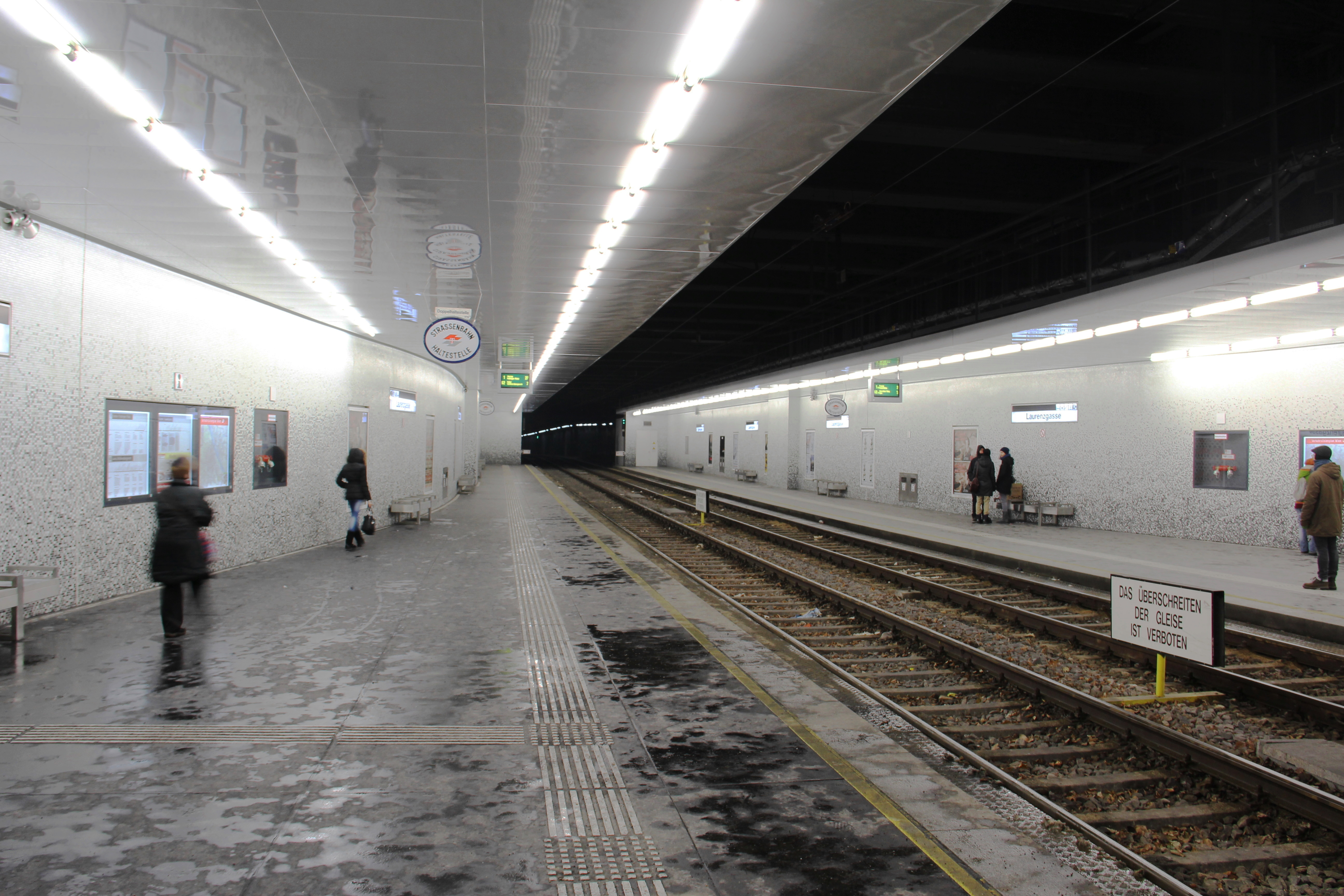
Refurbished Laurenzgasse station

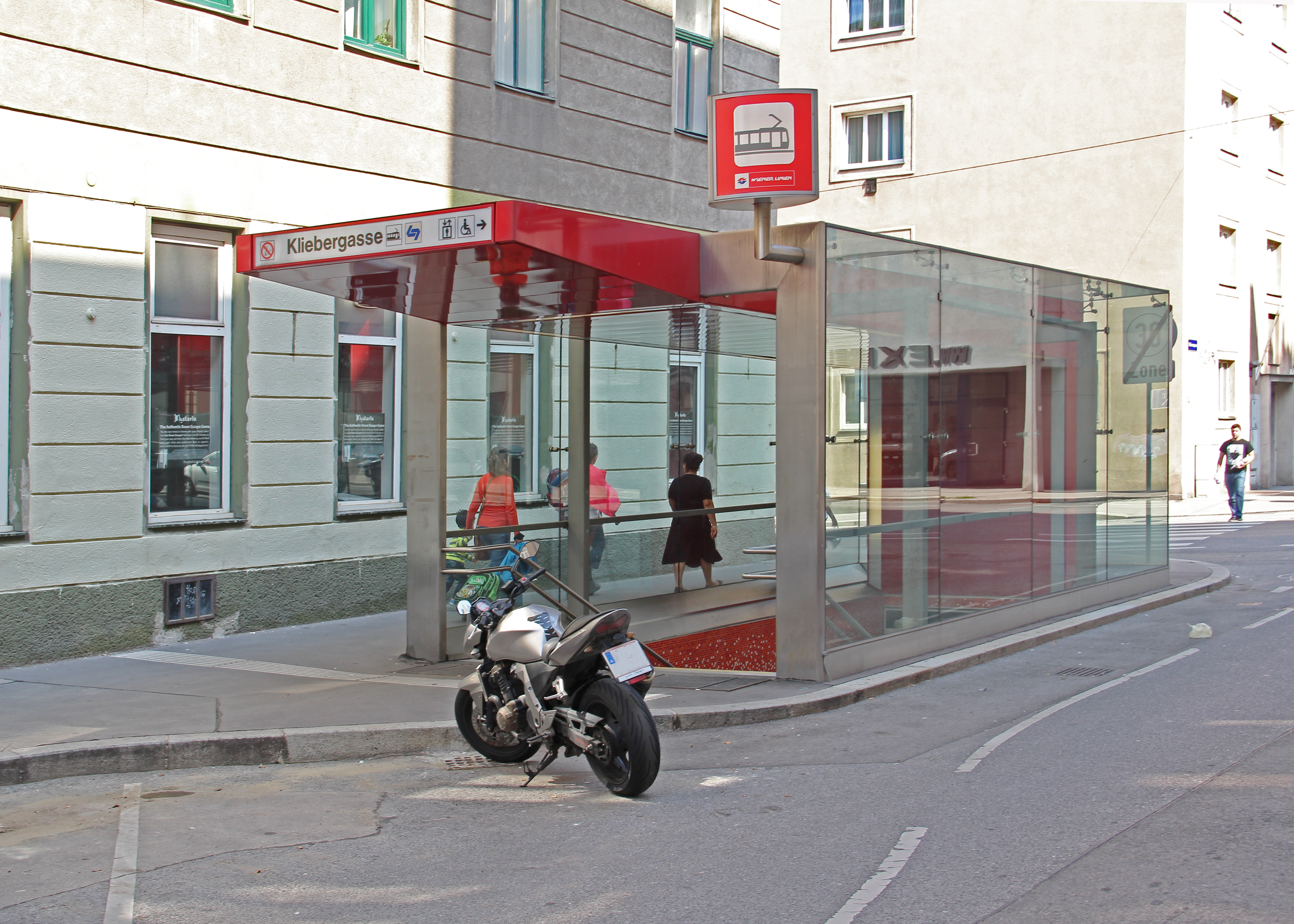
Refurbished entrance to Kliebergasse station

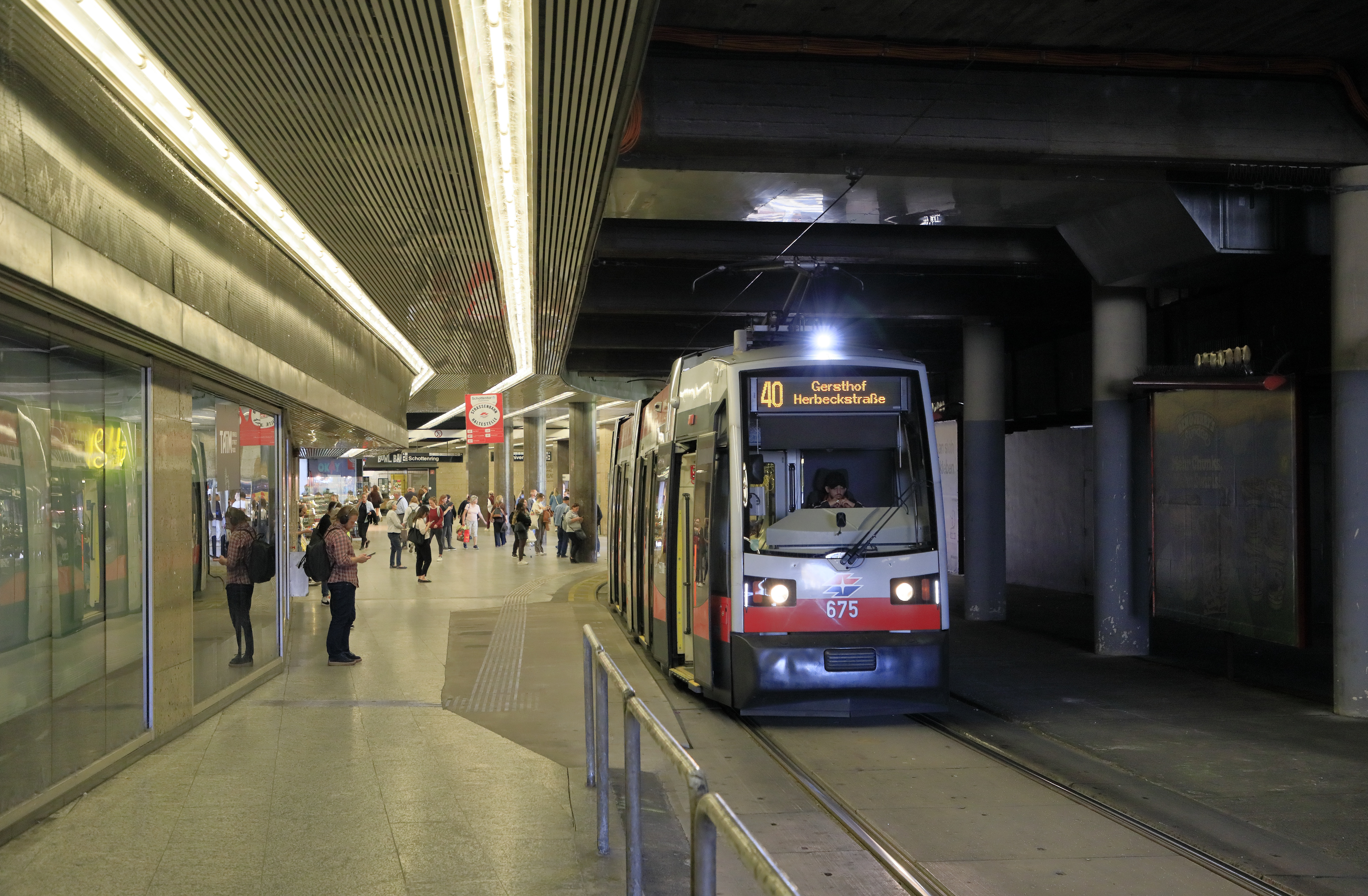
Schottentor tram loop.

=== Schottentor ===
In 1961, at Schottentor, an underground tramway loop was built for several tramway lines. Above this facility at street level, another tramway loop for two more lines is located. Since 1980, this terminus is connected to the U-Bahn line U2.

This underground tram station is popularly called Jonas-Reindl, because of its circular, recessed, but in the middle open form, after the Austrian expression "Reindl" for casserole and the former Viennese mayor Franz Jonas. Most underground tram projects were planned and built during his reign. There were plans for an extension of this underground section to the city center in the 1960s, which have not been proceeded.

=== Erzherzog-Karl-Straße ===
The underground station Erzherzog-Karl-Straße passes under the S-Bahn station Vienna Erzherzog-Karl-Straße. This station, which is also served by buses, was opened in 1971 in the course of the extension of the tramway line 26. There is an elevator that leads directly to the central platform 1/2 or to the middle platform 3/4 of the S-Bahn station. There were no plans to convert this station into an U-Bahn station.

== See also ==
- Transportation in Vienna
