= Schottentor station =

Vienna U-Bahn station

Schottentor
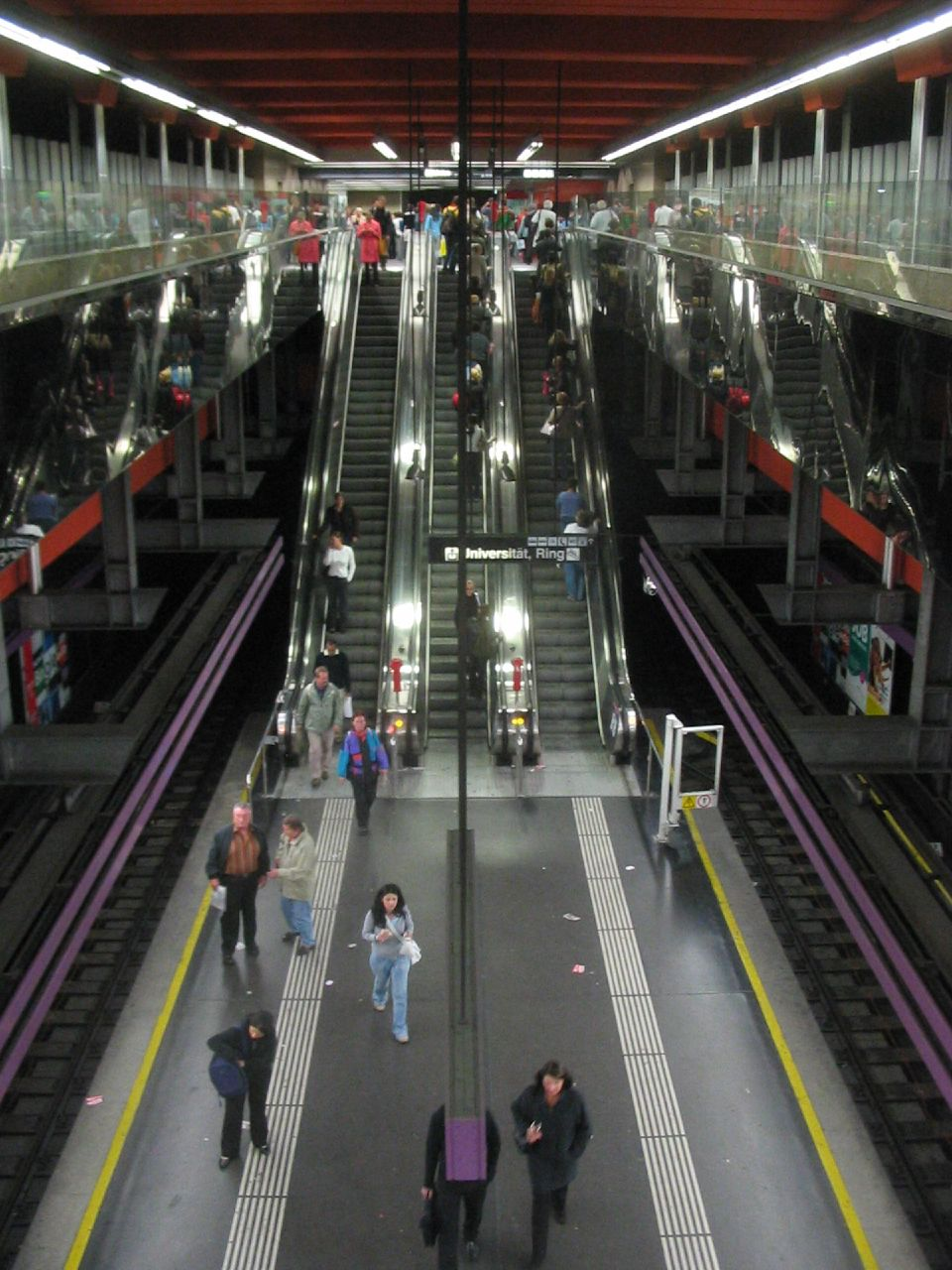

General information
- Location: Innere Stadt, Vienna; Austria
- Coordinates: 48.2149°N 16.3633°E

History
- Opened: 30 August 1980

Services
Preceding station	Wiener Linien	Following station
Rathaus toward Karlsplatz	U2	Schottenring toward Seestadt
Location

Schottentor is a station on U2 of the Vienna U-Bahn. It is located in the Innere Stadt, next to the main building of the University of Vienna. The station is alternatively designated Schottentor-Universität.

== History ==
Following the demolition of the city walls in the 1850s, the planning of the Ringstraße and the Votivkirche resulted in a five-way road junction at the former Schottentor. With the opening of Vienna’s first tramway lines, the junction became a key node of the horse-drawn tramway network.

On 29 April 1961, an above-ground tram loop was opened, followed by an underground loop on 16 September 1961. Because of its oval shape, resembling a pan or casserole when seen from above (Viennese dialect: Reindl), and in reference to then mayor Franz Jonas, the facility became known as the Jonasreindl. Trams arriving from Universitätsstraße (lines 43 and 44) use the surface loop, while lines coming from Währinger Straße (37, 38, 40, 41, and 42) use the underground loop on the first basement level. Provision was made for a possible extension of the underground tramway toward the Opera via Herrengasse, but this plan was abandoned in the mid-1960s with the development of the Vienna U-Bahn.

== Station ==
The Schottentor transport complex is one of the busiest public transport hubs in Vienna, with a total of 13 lines converging there. In addition to the U2, these include the through tram lines D, 1, and 71 running along the Ringstraße; the radial tram lines 37, 38, 40, 41, 42, 43, and 44; and the bus lines 1A and 40A, which terminate at the junction. The high passenger volume is largely due to the adjacent university and the large number of intersecting transport lines. The planned U5 line is intended to relieve the station by taking over passengers from the radial tram lines.

An underground pedestrian passage connected to the tram loops allows crossings beneath the Ringstraße and Schottengasse via stairs and escalators. The so-called Schottenpassage and the underground loop contain snack bars, shops, and public toilets.

== Gallery ==
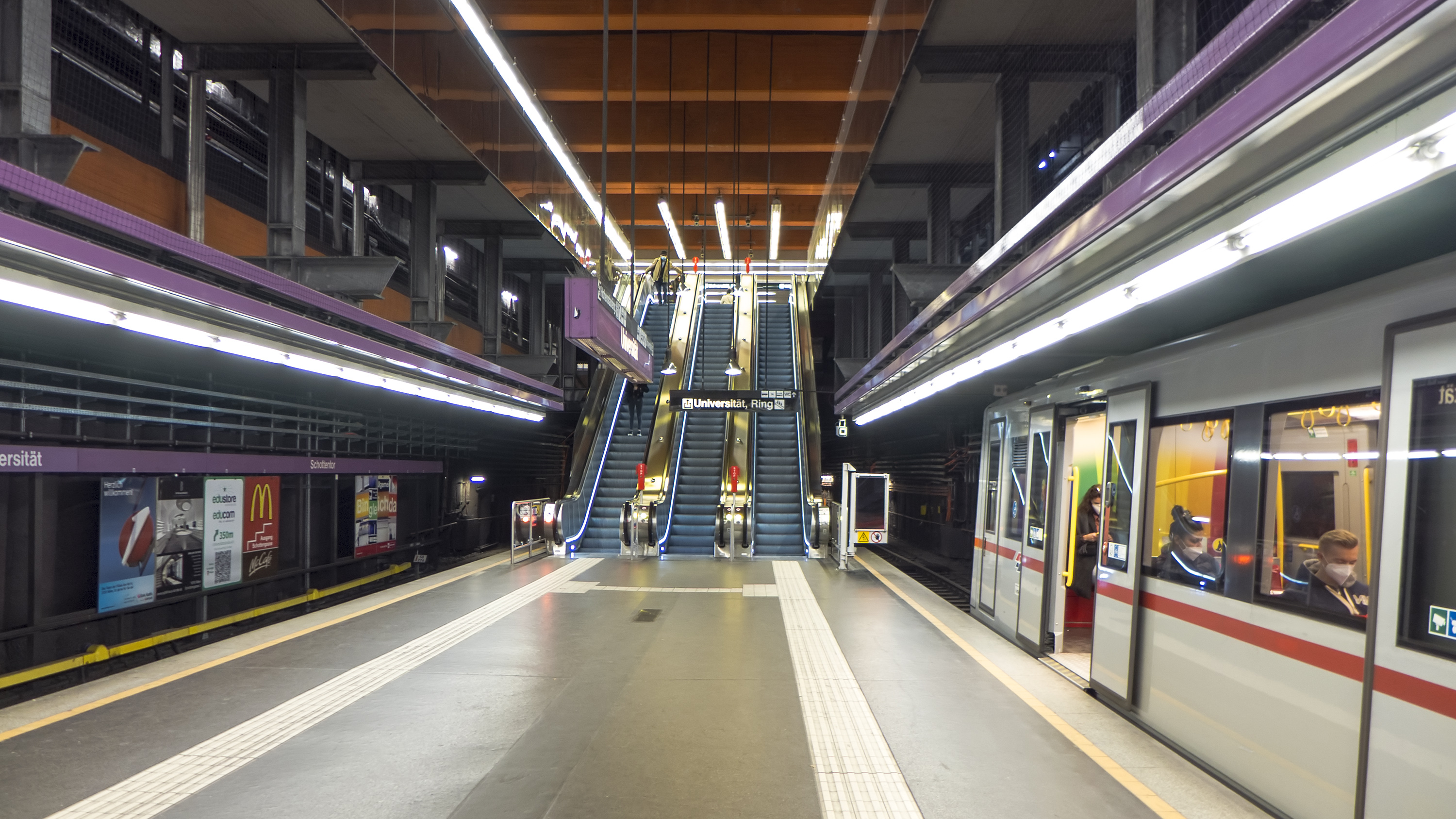
The platform of the station

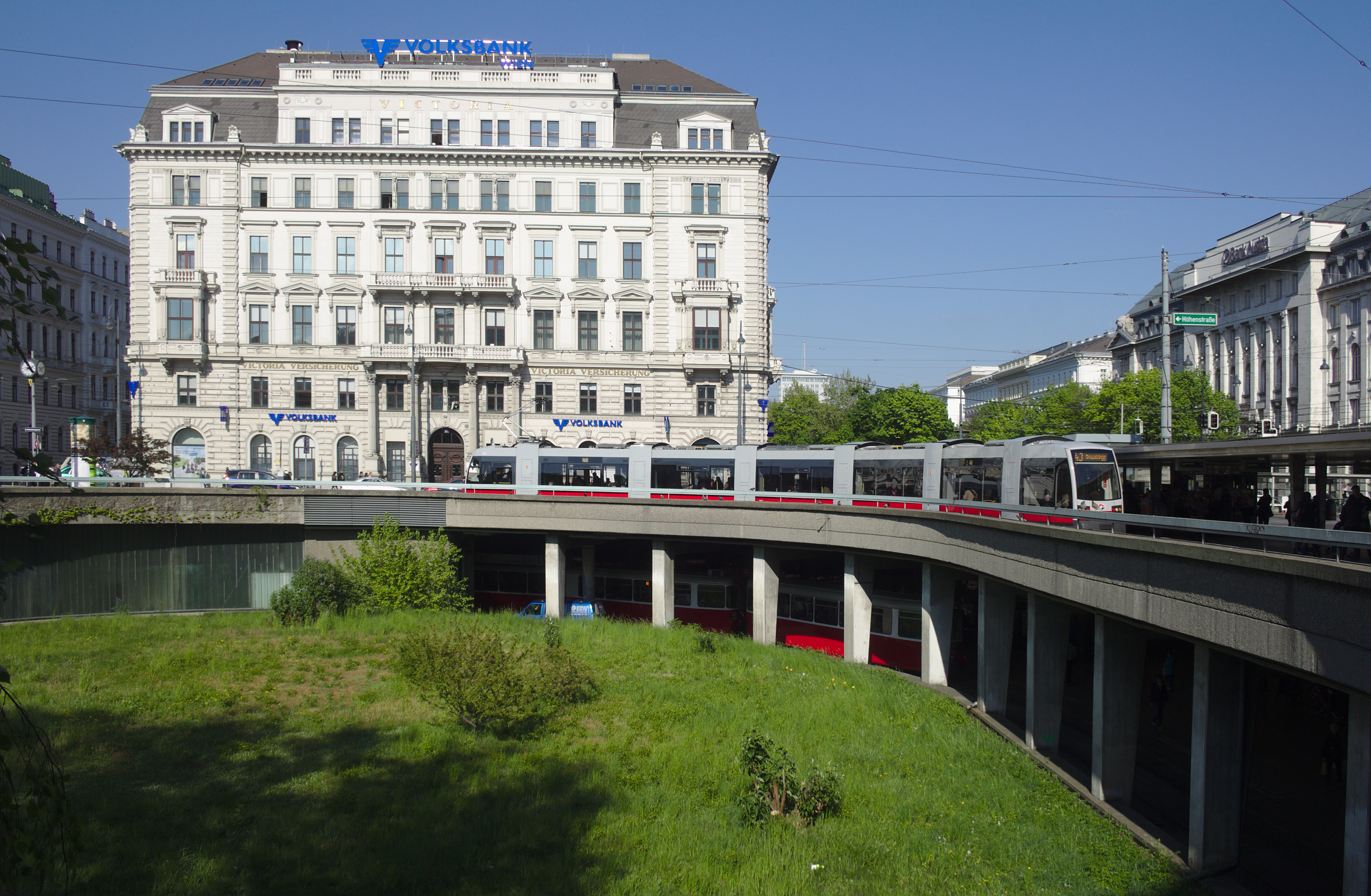
The two-floored Jonasreindl with two trams entering the station

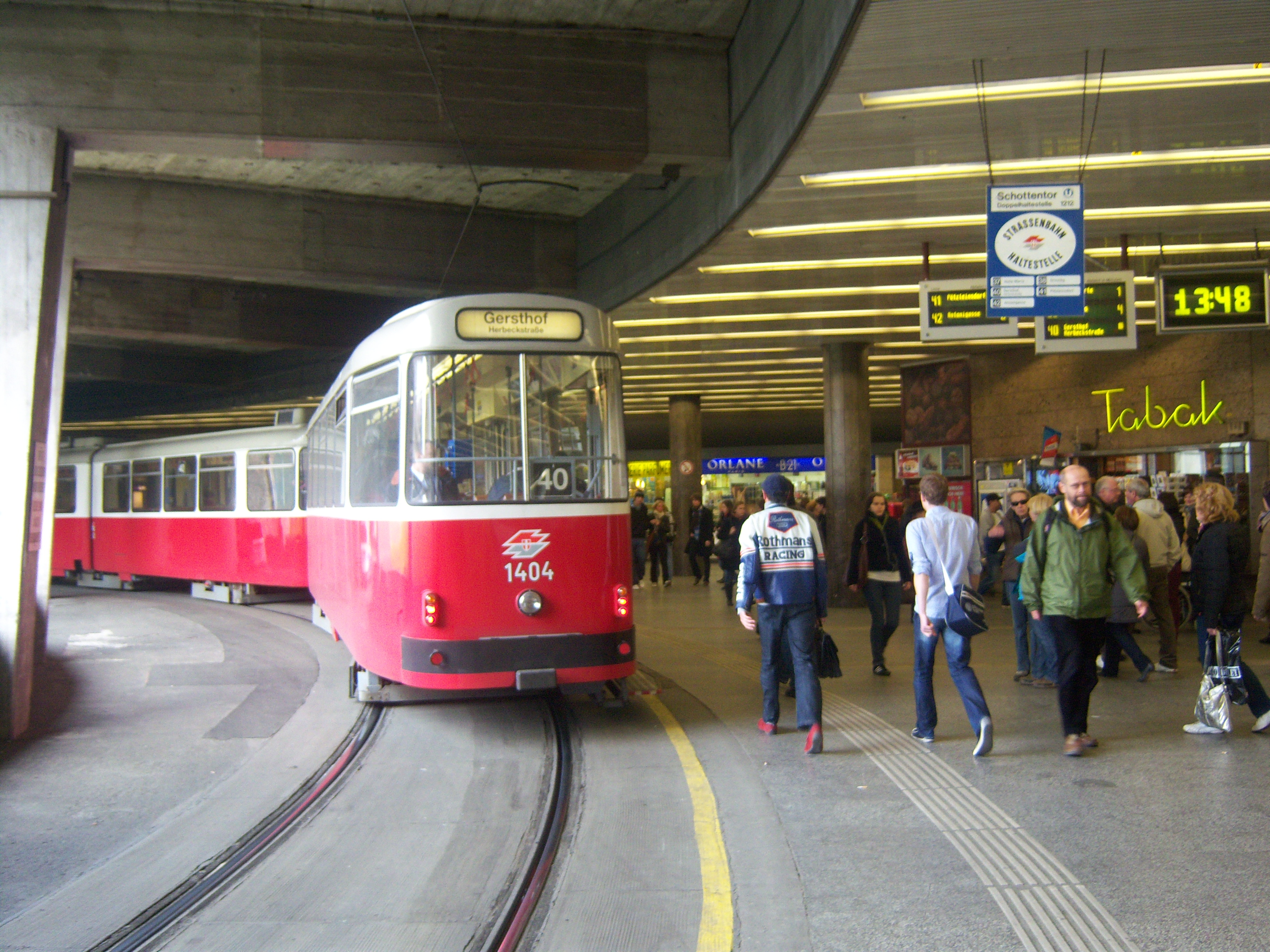
A tram in the station

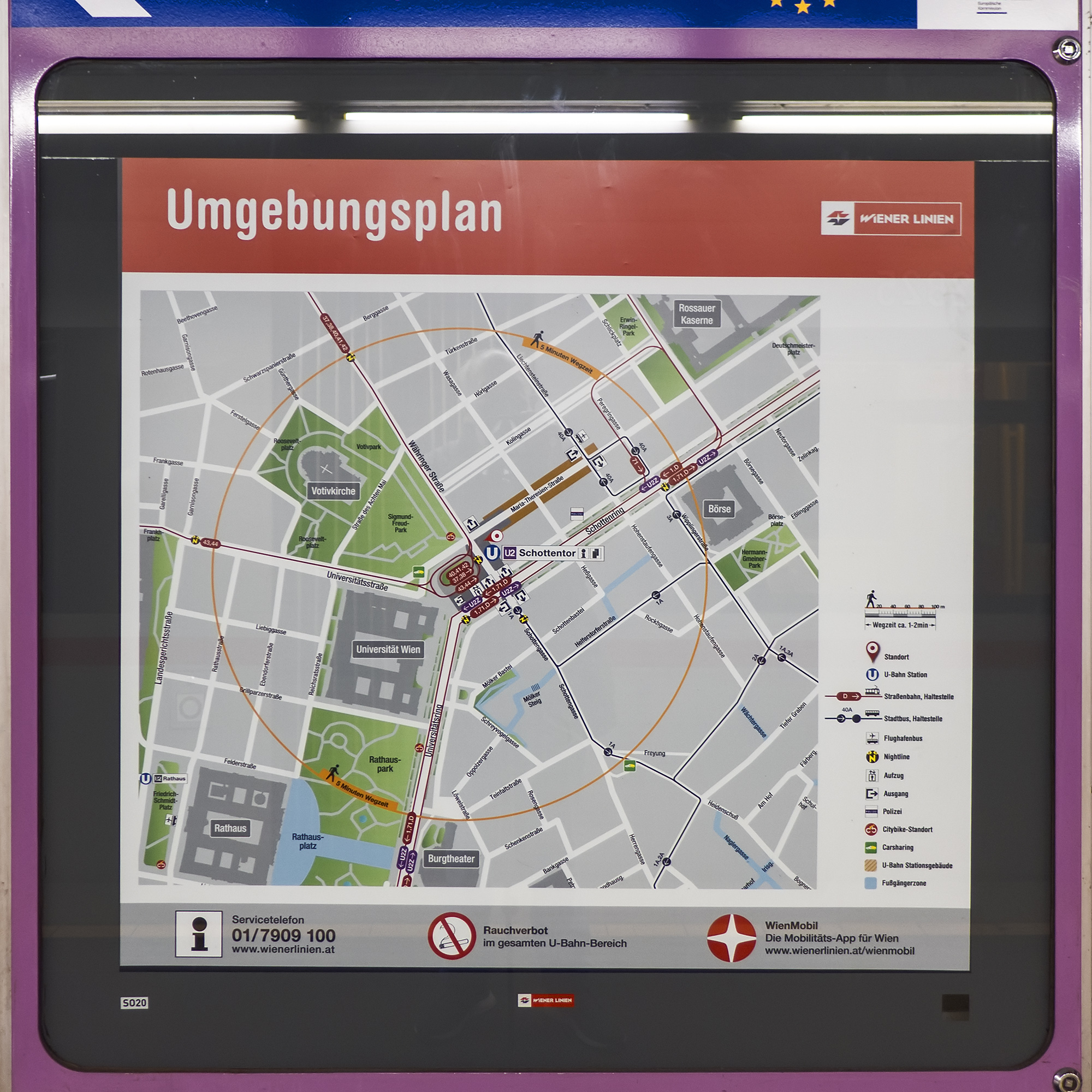
Map of the surrounding area
