= Museumsquartier station =

Vienna U-Bahn station

Museumsquartier
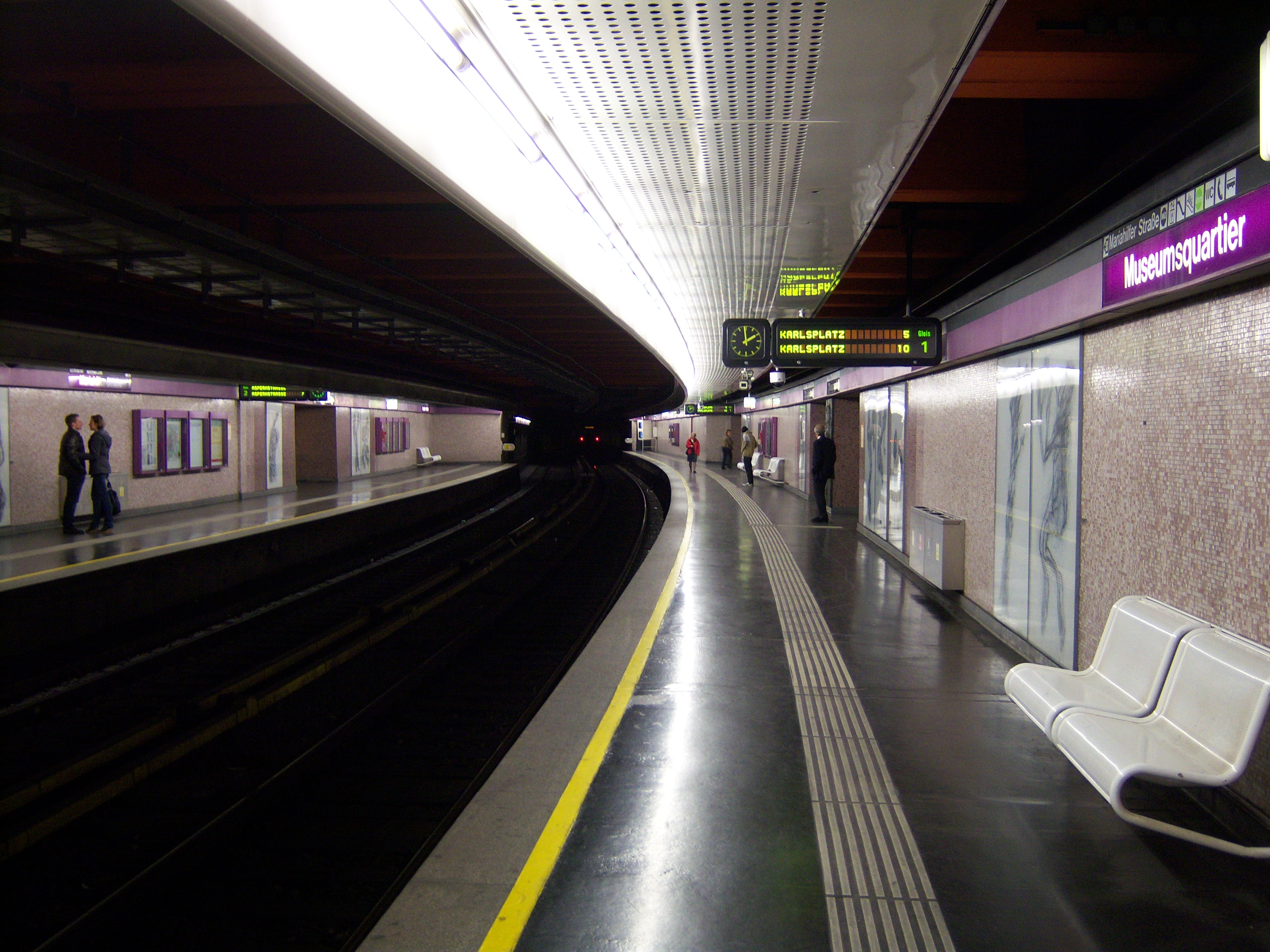

General information
- Location: Innere Stadt, Vienna; Austria
- Coordinates: 48.2025°N 16.3614°E

History
- Opened: 30 August 1980

Services
Preceding station	Wiener Linien	Following station
Karlsplatz Terminus	U2	Volkstheater toward Seestadt
Location

Museumsquartier (formerly Mariahilfer Straße until 1991 and Babenbergerstraße from 1991 until 2000) is a station on U2 of the Vienna U-Bahn. It is located in the Innere Stadt District. It opened in 1980, using the structure of a pre-metro station opened in 1966 in the same location.

The station was closed temporarily from 2020 until late 2024 to install platform screen doors in preparation for the transfer of this segment of U2 to the new driverless U5, which will take place between 2025 and 2027.
