= Rathaus station (Vienna U-Bahn) =

Vienna U-Bahn station

Rathaus
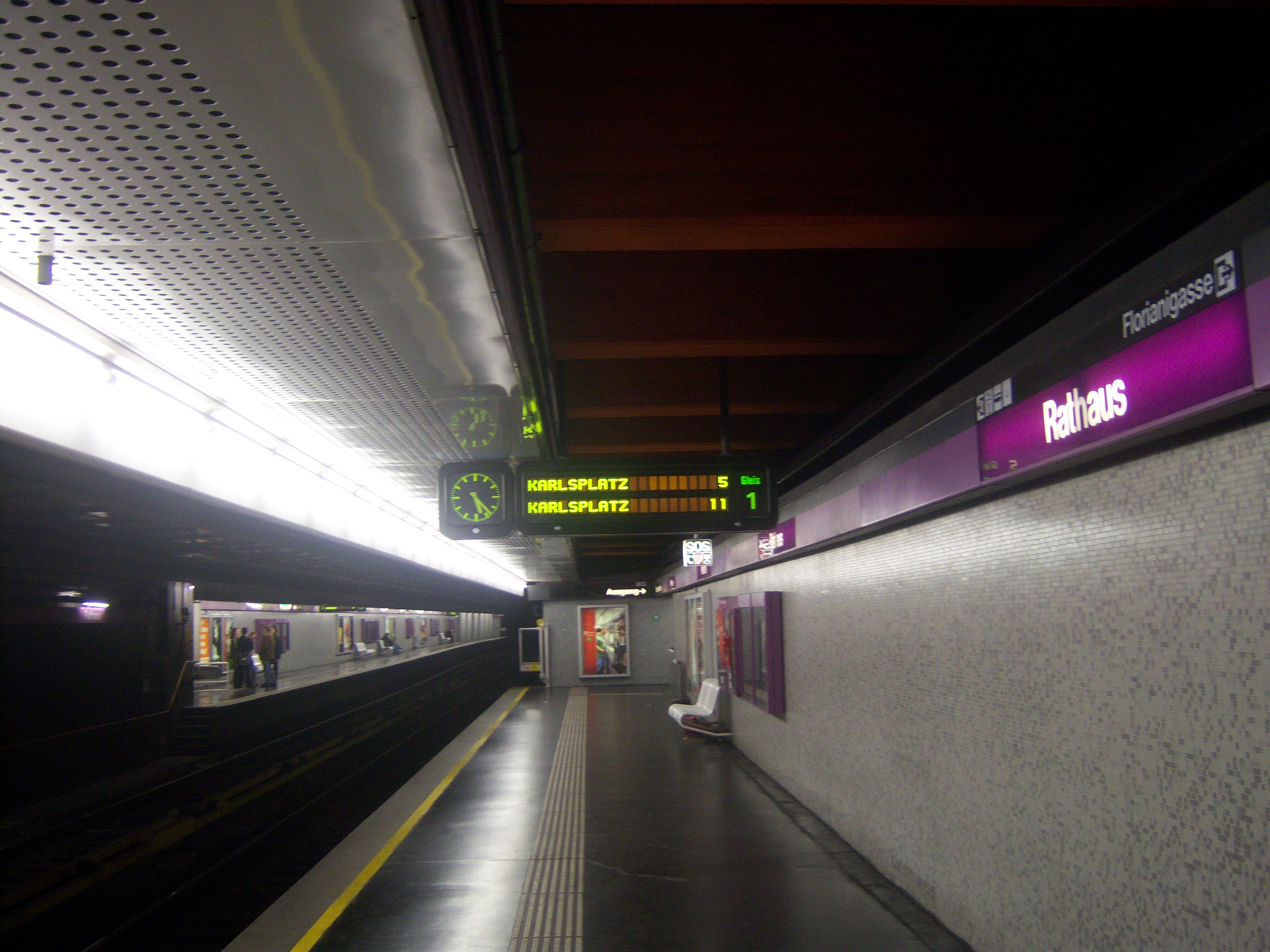

General information
- Location: Innere Stadt, Vienna; Austria
- Coordinates: 48.2104°N 16.3554°E

History
- Opened: 30 August 1980

Services
Preceding station	Wiener Linien	Following station
Volkstheater toward Karlsplatz	U2	Schottentor toward Seestadt
Location

Rathaus is a station on U2 of the Vienna U-Bahn. It is located in the Innere Stadt District. It opened in 1980. It is on the border between the 1st and 8th districts of Vienna. It is located directly under Landesgerichtsstraße between Josefstädter Straße and Friedrich-Schmidt-Platz and has two side platforms and exits on both sides of Landesgerichtsstraße. At the Josefstädter Straße exit, it is possible to change to tram line 2 in the direction of Dornbach or Friedrich-Engels-Platz. Barrier-free access by elevator is currently only possible via the Friedrich-Schmidt-Platz exit.

The station is named after the Vienna City Hall in the immediate vicinity. Other notable points in the vicinity of the station are the Parliament, the building complex of the Vienna Regional Court, the former Military Geographical Institute and the Niedermair cabaret venue.

== Expansion project Linienkreuz U2/U5 ==
Between 2021 and 2028, as part of the U2/U5 Linienkreuz (line crossing) expansion project, new platforms for the U2 line will be built around 30 meters below street level and thus below the current station, which will then lead to Matzleinsdorfer Platz.

== Nearby points of interest ==
- Rathaus
- Austrian Parliament Building
