= Rome–Giardinetti railway =

Railway line in Italy

Coordinates: 41.8647°N 12.6044°E

Roma–Giardinetti

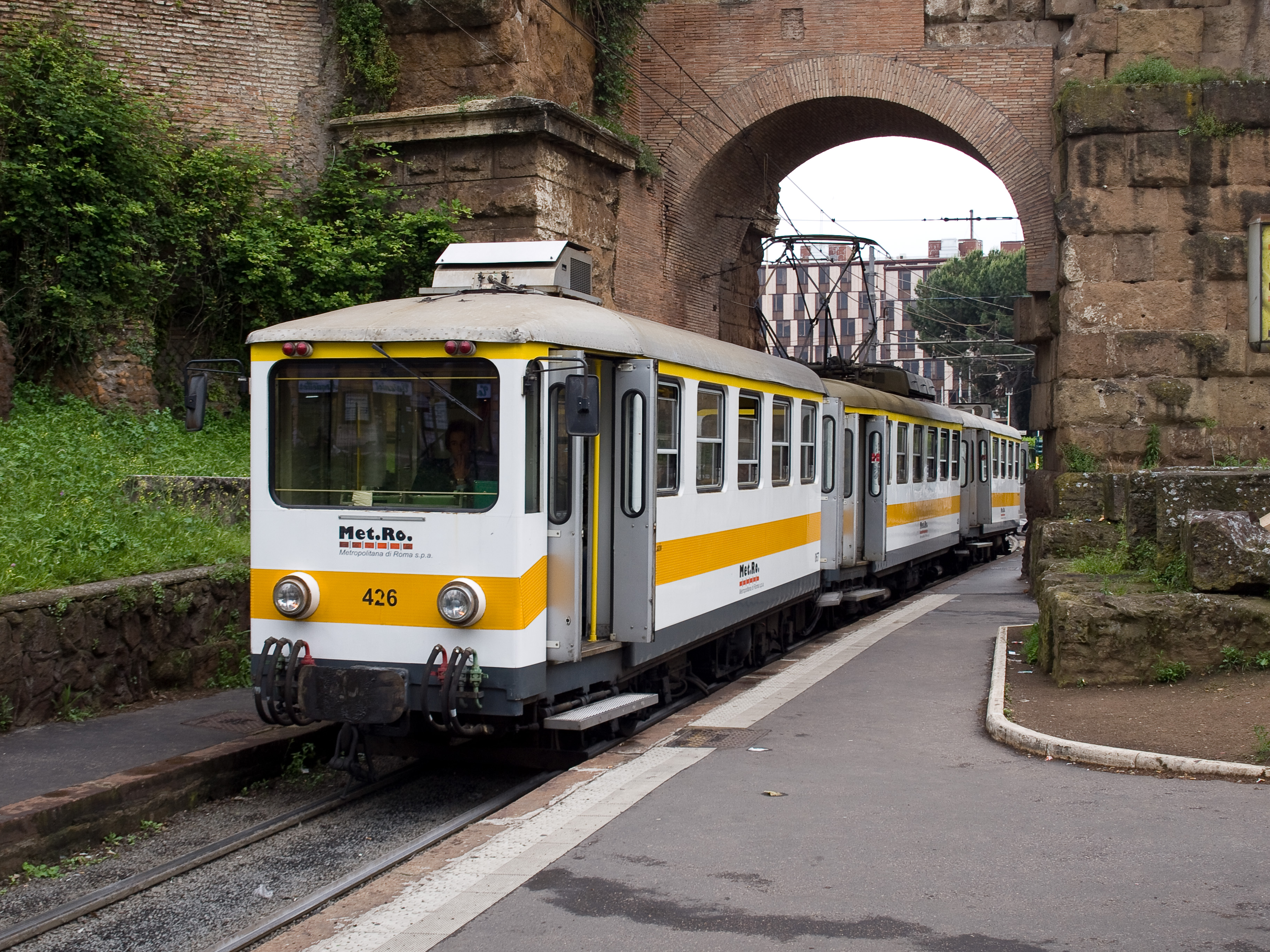
- A train at Porta Maggiore in 2010

Overview
- Status: Closed (since April 2026)
- Owner: ATAC
- Locale: Rome, Italy
- Termini: Roma Termini; Giardinetti
- Stations: 19 (7 closed)
- Website: ATAC

Service
- Type: Light rail Tram-train
- Operator: ATAC

History
- Opened: 1916
- Closed: 2015 (Centocelle-Giardinetti); 2026 (Termini-Centocelle)

Technical
- Line length: 5.4 km (3.4 mi)
- Track gauge: 950 mm (3 ft 1 3/8 in)
- Electrification: 1,650 V DC, overhead lines
Route map
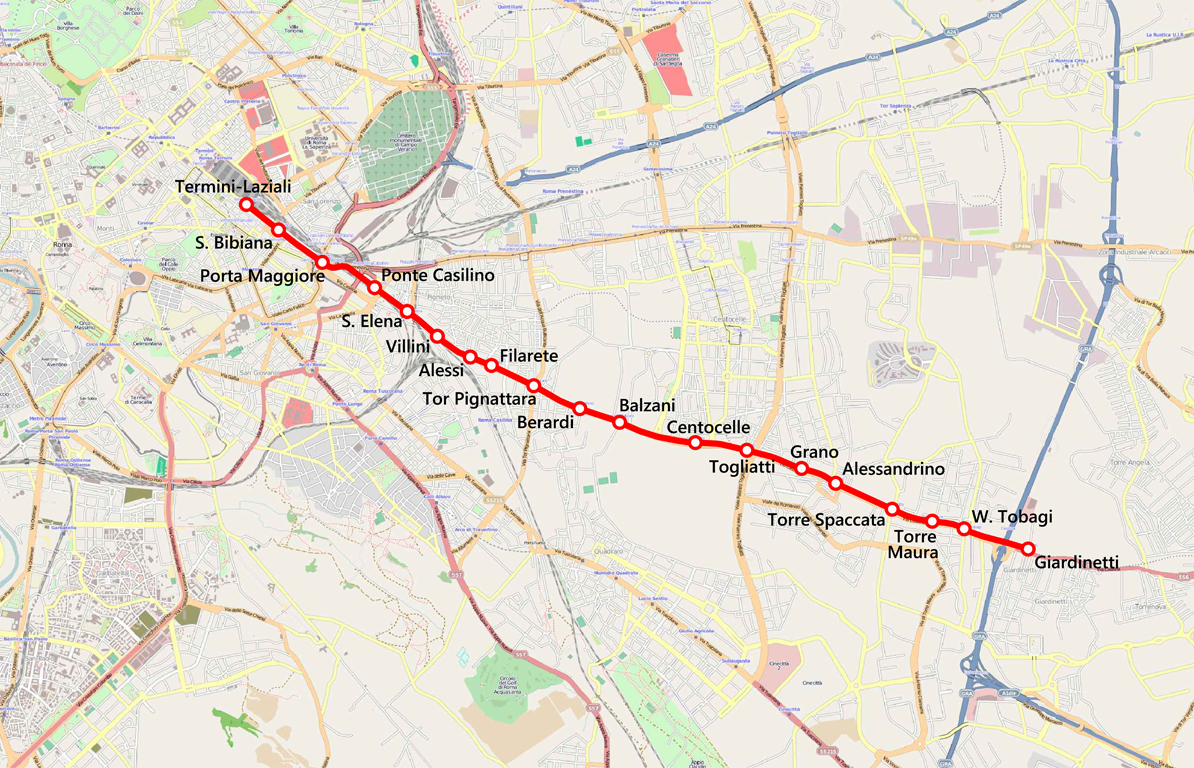
Map of the Rome–Giardinetti railway.

The Roma–Giardinetti railway was a narrow-gauge street running tram-train railway in Rome, Italy. It connected Laziali (a regional train station some 800 metres (2,625 ft) from Termini's main concourse) with Giardinetti to the east just past the Grande Raccordo Anulare, Rome's orbital motorway. It was run by ATAC, the company responsible for public transportation in the city, which also operates the Rome Metro. The line closed in April 2026 to undergoing a transformation to a tram line.

== History ==
The railway was the last remnant of the older and longer Rome–Fiuggi–Alatri–Frosinone railway to be in service.

The latest shortenings of the line occurred in 2008 with the closing of the Giardinetti–Pantano section, which has now become part of the Metro Line C and in 2015 when the Centocelle-Giardinetti closed.

The line had been due to be dismantled in 2016 to be replaced with a bus lane along Via Casilina, but in March 2015 it was announced that the line would instead be retained and modernised.

As of 2026, the eastern terminus of the line is at southwestern corner of Prenestino-Centocelle neighborhood.

On 4 March 2026, two trains collided on a single-track section near Ponte Casilino. There were no injuries, but all service has been suspended since then.

The line closed for good in April 2026 for a four-year project to transform the railway in a tramway, connecting it to the tram network (also regauging it to almost standard gauge).
