= Sant'Agnese - Annibaliano (Rome Metro) =

Rome metro station

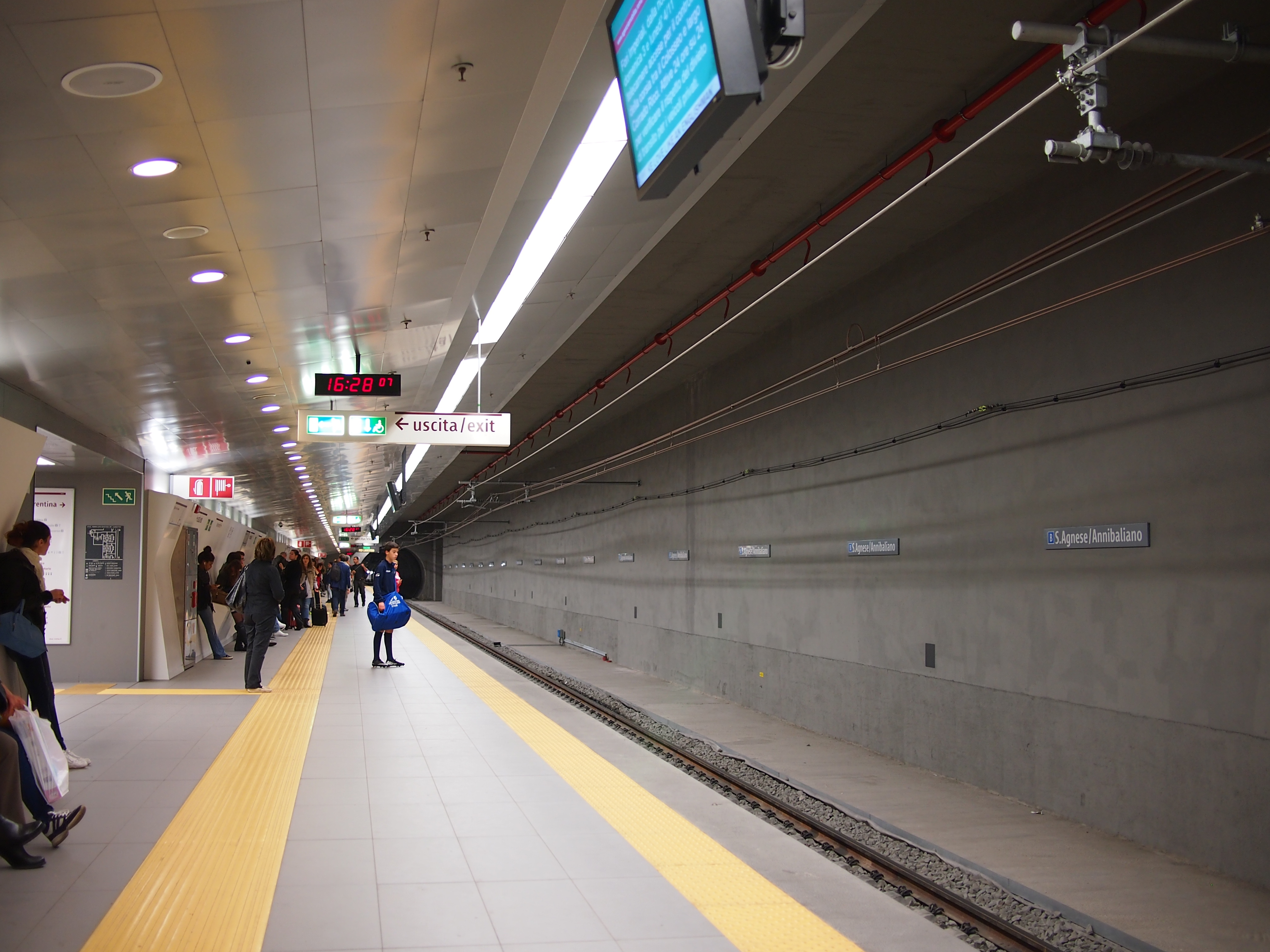
- The station's southbound platform

General information
- Location: Piazza Annibaliano, Rome; Italy
- Coordinates: 41°55′26″N 12°30′57″E
- Owner: ATAC

Construction
- Structure type: Underground

History
- Opened: 13 June 2012; 14 years ago

Services
Preceding station	Rome Metro	Following station
Bologna towards Laurentina	Line B	Libia towards Jonio
Location
- Click on the map to see marker

Sant'Agnese - Annibaliano is an underground station on Line B of the Rome Metro. It opened on 13 June 2012 as part of the Line B1 four station extension from Bologna to Conca d'Oro. It takes its name from the nearby church of Sant'Agnese fuori le mura and from the square under which the station is located, Piazza Annibaliano.
