= Libia (Rome Metro) =

Rome metro station

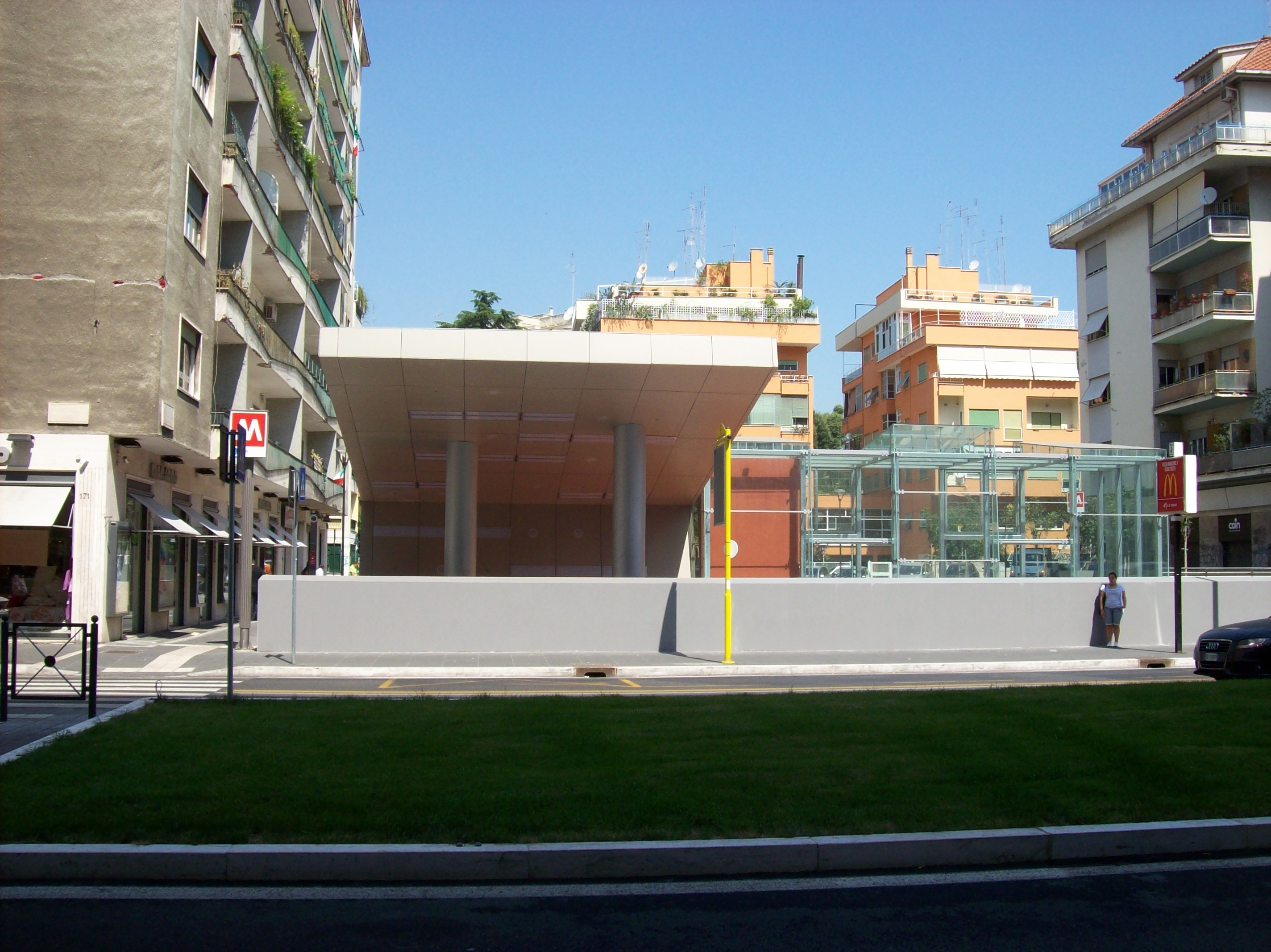
- Part of the entrance to the station in 2012

General information
- Location: Rome; Italy
- Coordinates: 41°55′58″N 12°31′14″E
- Owner: ATAC

Construction
- Structure type: Underground

History
- Opened: 13 June 2012; 14 years ago

Services
Preceding station	Rome Metro	Following station
Sant'Agnese - Annibaliano towards Laurentina	Line B	Conca d'Oro towards Jonio
Location
- Click on the map to see marker

Libia is an underground station on Line B of the Rome Metro. It is located at the junction of Viale Libia with Via Tigrè and Piazza Palombara Sabina. Originally, the station was supposed to be named Libia-Gondar, referring to the nearby Piazza Gondar.

The station opened on 13 June 2012 as part of the Line B1, an extension of Line B from Bologna to Conca d'Oro.
