= Metrebus Card =

Smart card for public transport in Rome

- Location: Rome, Italy
- Launched: 1999
- Manager: ERG Motorola Alliance
- Currency: Euro (year pass maximum load)
- Validity: Trains; Buses; Trams; Metro
- Retailed: Online; Ticket offices
- Website: https://www.atac.roma.it/page.asp?p=20

The Metrebus Card is a contactless smartcard ticketing system for Rome. It has stored value on a paper ticket for either 1, 3 or 7 days. All three versions of the tickets look the same on the front, but on the back of the ticket the magnetic data printed on the ticket varies depending on which version of the ticket was purchased.

Metrebus (an acronym composed of the words "Metro", "Train" and "Bus") is an integrated fare system active in the city of Rome and in much of the Lazio region. It is divided into two categories: Metrebus Roma, which includes all travel tickets that can be used within the municipality of Rome, and Metrebus Lazio, which divides Lazio by area and can only be used in the areas indicated at the time of purchase. The system includes the three main companies that manage local public transport in the Lazio region, namely ATAC, Cotral and Trenitalia.

There is also a single ticket "BIT” (Biglietto Integrato a Tempo), which sells for only €1.50, allowing travel on any bus and one trip on the metro or urban trains. This version of the ticket has a 100-minute expiry period.

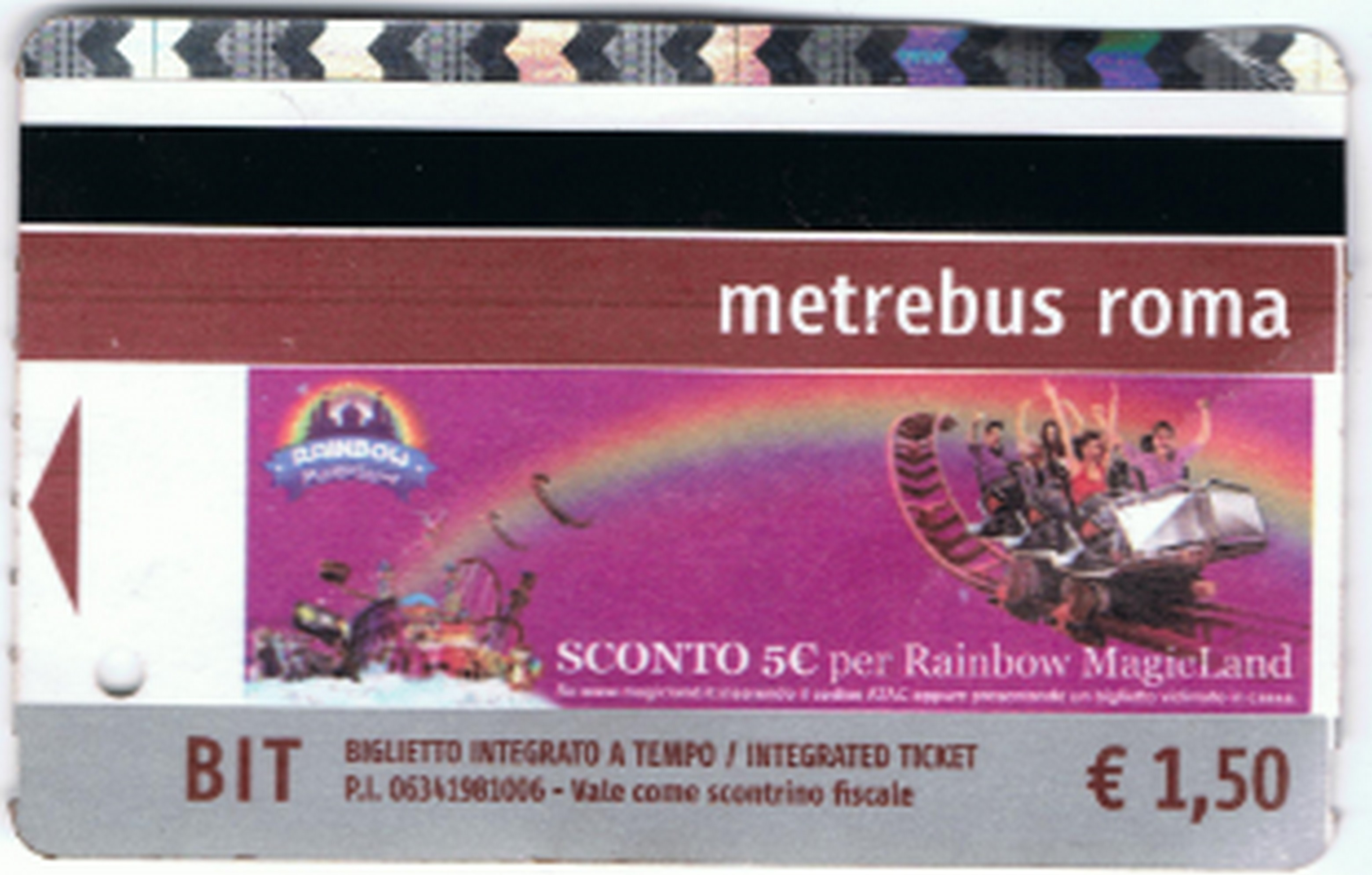
BIT ticket (2014)

With the new automatic ticket machines in the Rome Metro introduced in 2022 that adopt chip-on-paper technology, the classic "BIT" paper ticket becomes a rechargeable card "+Roma". It is a paper ticket with the same validity as the classic ticket, it is possible to top it up at any automatic ticket machines on the metro or in authorized sales points (tobacconists, newsstands etc.), only by adding 50 cents more on the first purchase.

Since 2018 ATAC and Mastercard introduced the "Tap&Go" system to all public transport, it is possible to pay for single rides with credit, debit or prepaid cards, contactless cards or cards enabled for offline payments (OTA). Access to buses, trams, trolleybuses and metro lines is possible also with digital cards on NFC-enabled devices (smartphones, smartwatches, wearables).

== Travel tickets ==
=== Rome ===
Timed tickets

- BIT: integrated time ticket valid for 100 minutes from the first stamping for a single journey (even on multiple lines) on all means of transport in the urban area of Rome;
- 10-BIT: 10 BIT carnet which can be reactivated at a validator after 100 minutes from the first stamping until the available reactivations are exhausted;
- CIS: integrated weekly card valid for seven days including stamping for an unlimited number of trips on all vehicles in the urban area of Rome;
- Roma24H, Roma48H and Roma72H: tickets valid respectively 24, 48 and 72 hours from the first stamping for an unlimited number of trips on all transport in the urban area of Rome;

Pass (Metrebus Card)

- Monthly: season ticket valid for one calendar month for travel on all vehicles in the urban area of Rome; it can be personal or impersonal (therefore transferable);
- Annual: subscription valid for 365 days from the recharge date for travel on all vehicles in the urban area of Rome.

=== Lazio ===
Timed tickets

- BIRG: timed ticket valid until midnight on the day of validation for an unlimited number of trips within the region within the indicated areas;
- BTR: timed ticket valid until midnight of the third day including the day of validation itself for an unlimited number of trips within the territory of the region within the indicated areas;
- CIRS: timed ticket valid until midnight on the seventh day including that of the validation itself for an unlimited number of trips within the territory of the region within the indicated areas;

Pass (Metrebus Card)

- Monthly: zone pass valid for the calendar month shown on the card for an unlimited number of trips within the region within the indicated zones;
- Annual: zone pass valid for 365 days from the date shown on the card for an unlimited number of trips within the region within the indicated zones;
- Annual Student Pass: discounted pass valid from 1 September to 30 June of the following year for an unlimited number of trips within the region within the indicated areas.

== Release ==
After the contract was awarded to the ERG Motorola Alliance in 1999, the card system was rolled out across Rome, with the system becoming fully operational in 2001.

In 2009 in Anagnina, car parking with Metrebus was introduced, which involved swiping the card at entry and exit to the car park, with validators stationed there. This has allowed for improved traffic fluidity. There have been plans to extend this trial, with Montebello also set to receive this feature, which would again help the car park when all 354 spaces are occupied.

In 2011, a new VISA style smart card was implemented, with a much sturdier design and longer lifespan.

In April 2013, ATM top up for the Red Metrebus Card was implemented with its migration from contactless magnetic card to contactless smartcard. These cards can be reloaded by visiting any UniCredit ATM and entering the card number.

In June 2018, the Red Metrebus Card was replaced by a new one, which allowed Pay&Go in car parks and to reload it and purchase transport titles in PARC meters as well as with an NFC smartphone.

== Purchase ==
All Metrebus tickets can be purchased also at ATAC ticket offices at the following stations: Anagnina, Battistini, Cornelia, Lepanto, Ottaviano S. Pietro, Laurentina, EUR Fermi, Ponte Mammolo, Termini, and Conca d’Oro.
