= Bologna (Rome Metro) =

Rome metro station

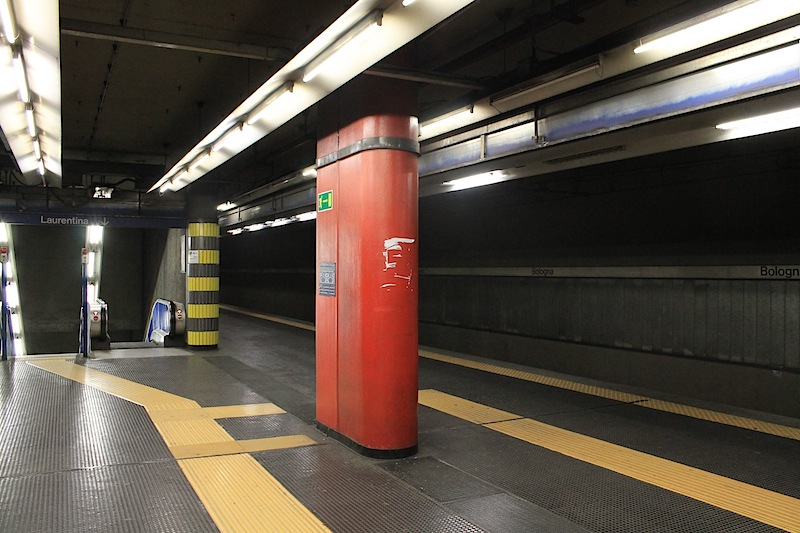

General information
- Coordinates: 41°54′48″N 12°31′14″E
- Owner: ATAC

Construction
- Structure type: Underground

History
- Opened: 8 December 1990; 35 years ago

Services
Preceding station	Rome Metro	Following station
Policlinico towards Laurentina	Line B	Tiburtina towards Rebibbia
Policlinico towards Laurentina	Line B	Sant'Agnese - Annibaliano towards Jonio
Location
- Click on the map to see marker

Bologna is a station on Line B of the Rome Metro. It is an underground station located under Piazza Bologna (at the intersection of Viale XXI Aprile, Via Livorno, Via Michele di Lando, Via Lorenzo il Magnifico, Viale delle Province, Via Sambucuccio d'Alando, Via Ravenna). It was opened on 8 December 1990.

It was involved in the October 2005 building works for line B1, a branch line off line B, a fairly complicated construction project that required special mitigation to existing buildings.

Its atrium houses mosaics from the Artemetro Roma prize, by Giuseppe Uncini and Vittorio Matino (Italy), Karl Gerstner (Switzerland) and Ulrich Erben (Germany).

== Connections ==
Routes (terminate here): 309, 445;
Routes: 61, 62, 310, 542 workdays and holidays;
Nearby routes (via Catania direction): 490, 495, 649;
Night buses: n2, n2L, n13.

== Surroundings and amenities ==
The Bologna Metropolitan Station is directly below Piazza Bologna. The Post office of piazza Bologna is located on the piazza's northwest side. The architect Mario Ridolfi designed the post office in 1932, which was built 1933–1935.

The Nomentano neighborhood is primarily a residential suburb. The station is in walking distance from many cafes, restaurants, and shops, with pedestrian traffic heavy well past 1900 hours.

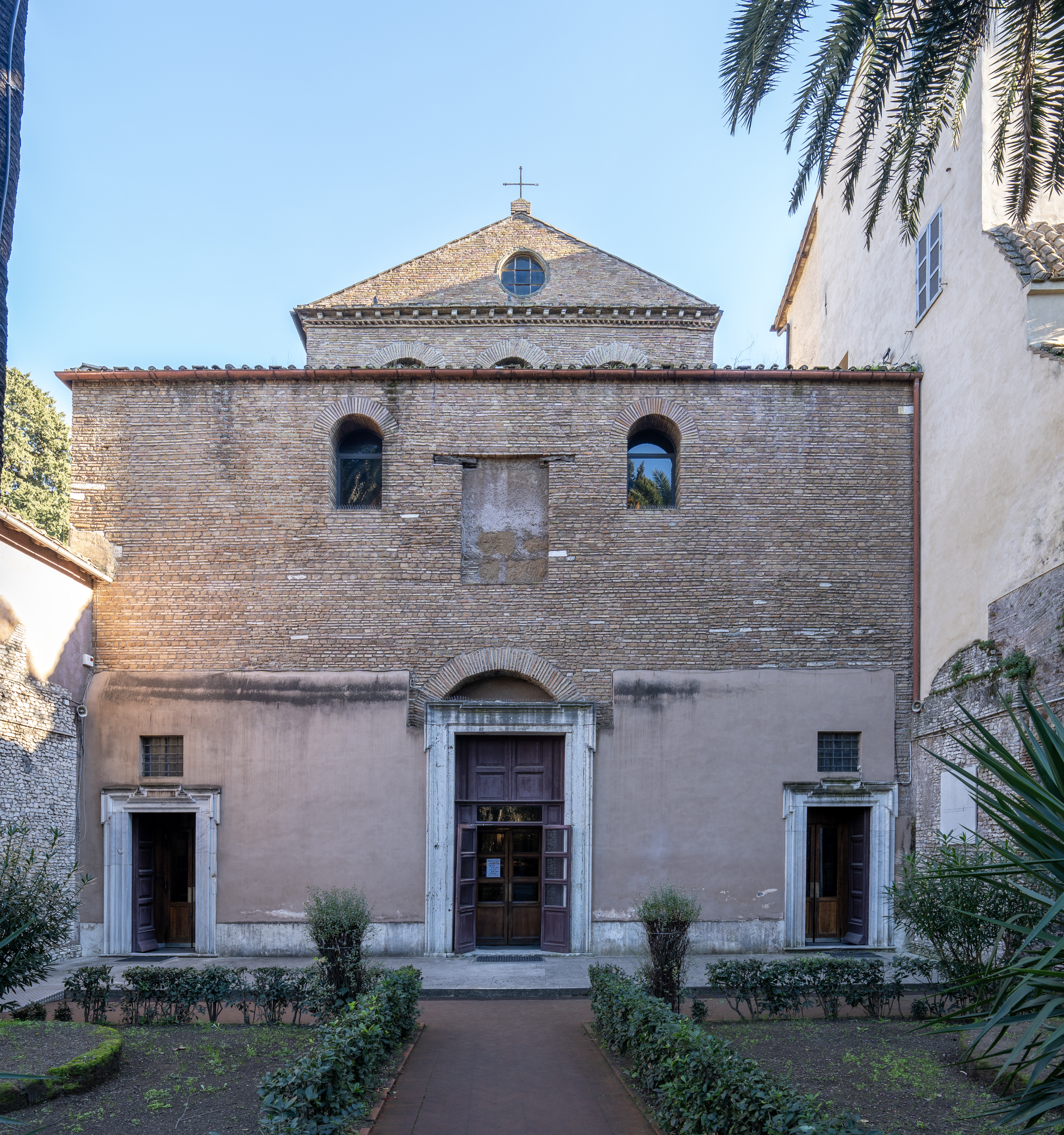
Façade of Chiesa Sant'Agnese

The major sites include the Sant'Agnese fuori le mura, about a 15 minute walk north from the Station, or about an 8-minute bus ride. Inside is the mausoleum of Santa Costanza. It is also close to the next station on line B1, Sant'Agnese - Annibaliano.

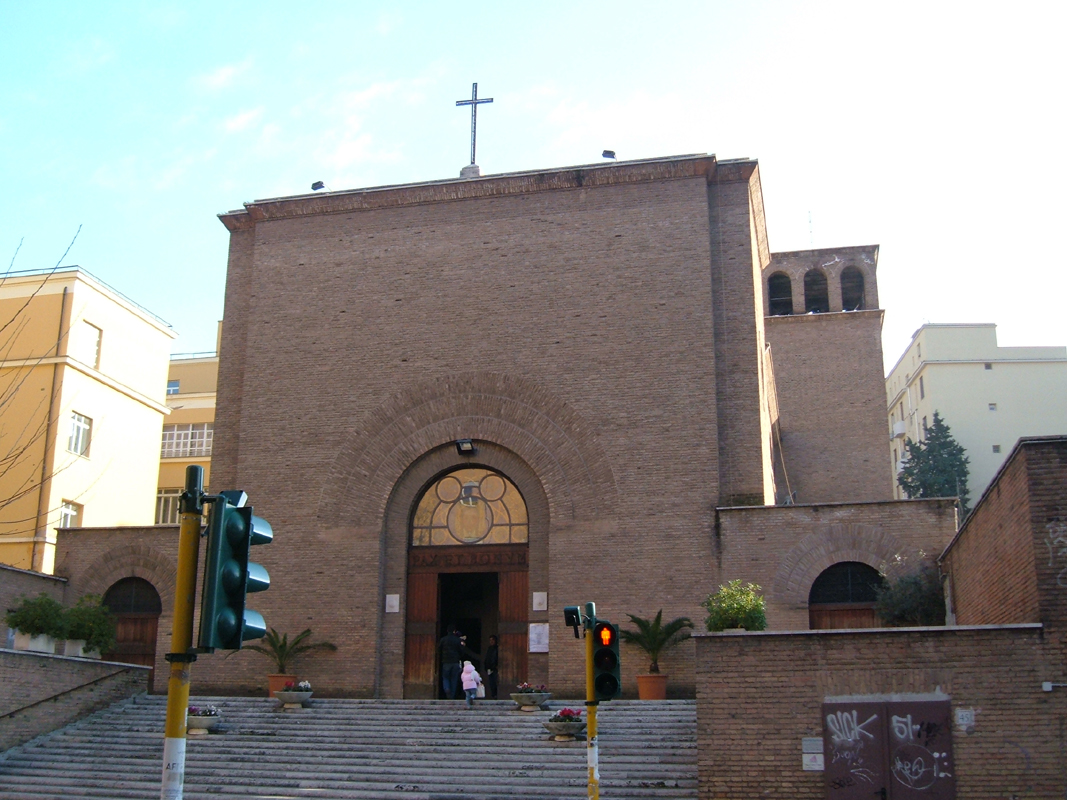
Façade of, and steps leading up to, Chiesa Sant'Ippolito

Chiesa di Sant'Ippolito is only a 4-minute walk south of the Station, but up a long flight of steps.

== Services ==
The station has:

- Disabled access
- Lift
- Escalators
