= Line B (Rome Metro) =

Rapid transit line in Rome, Italy

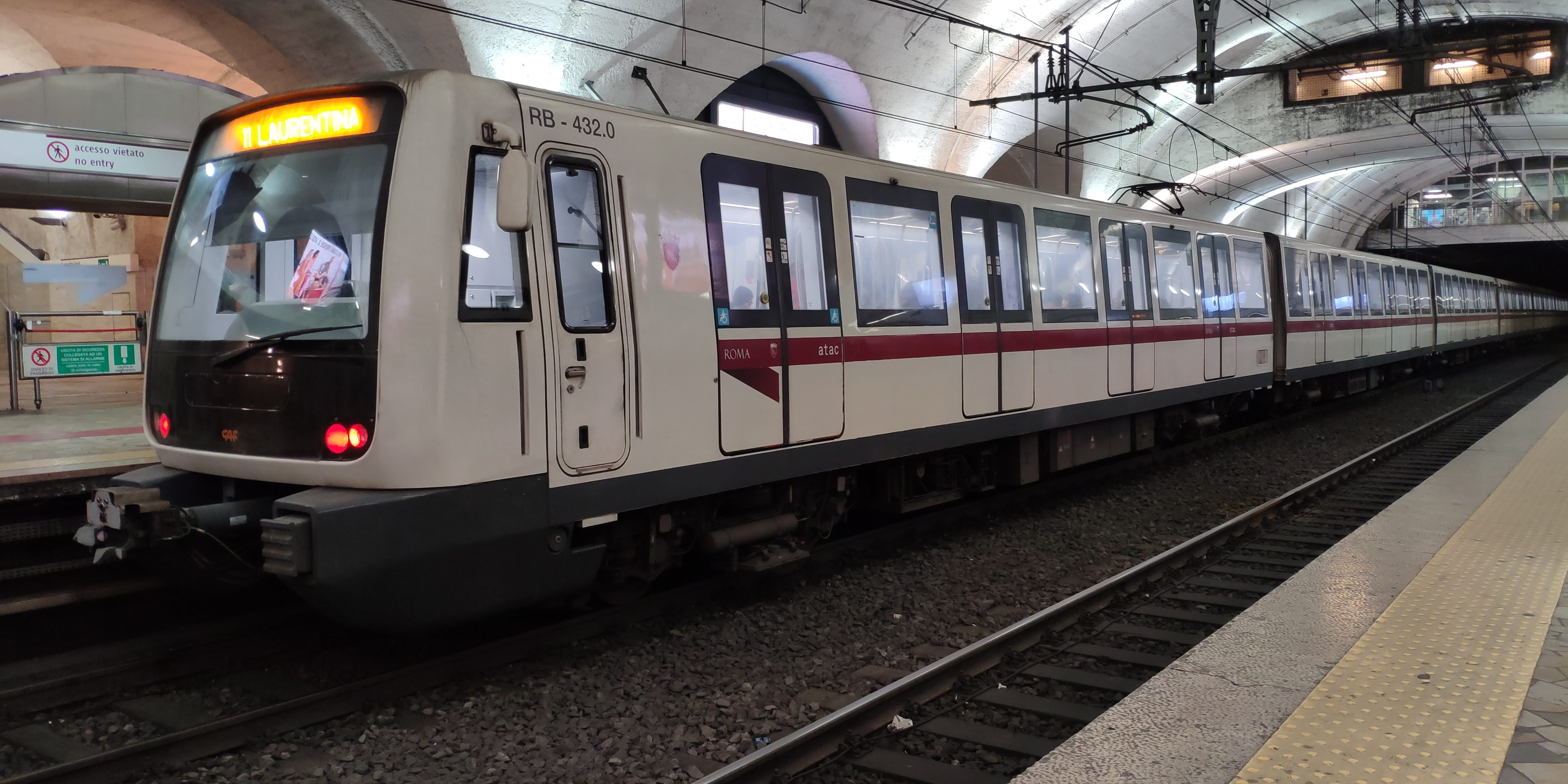
- A CAF MB/400 train in Termini Station

Overview
- Status: In use
- Owner: ATAC
- Locale: Rome, Italy
- Termini: Rebibbia (north-east), Jonio (north); Laurentina (south-west)
- Stations: 26

Service
- Type: Rapid transit
- System: Rome Metro
- Operator: ATAC
- Daily ridership: 156,590 (2023)

History
- Opened: 9 February 1955; 71 years ago
- Last extension: 21 April 2015

Technical
- Line length: 18.151 km (11.279 mi) plus B1 branch of 5,5 km
- Character: Underground and Elevated
- Track gauge: 1,435 mm (4 ft 8 1/2 in)
- Electrification: Overhead lines
Route map
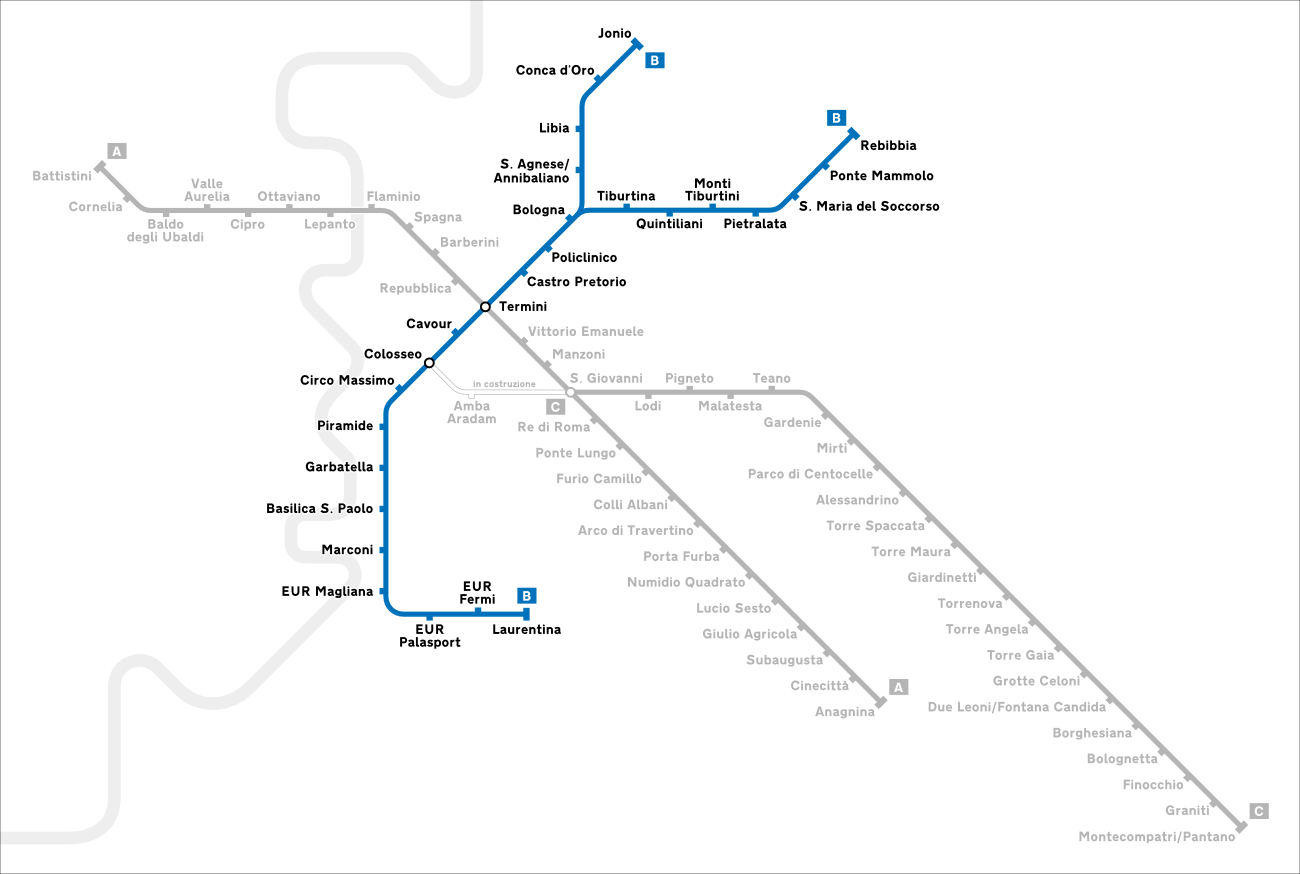

Line B is a metro line serving Rome, Italy, and part of the Rome Metro. Despite its name, Line B was the first line to be built in the city. It crosses Rome diagonally from the north-east—starting at the Rebibbia and Jonio branching stations—to the south, terminating at Laurentina in the EUR district. It interchanges with Line A at Termini station and with Line C at Colosseo. The line features 26 stations and is color-coded blue on transit maps.

== Overview ==
The line's first service runs at 05:30 and its last at 23:30, with late-night weekend services extended until 01:30 on Fridays and Saturdays. Line B carries approximately 345,000 passengers and runs 377 trains daily. During peak hours, trains run at a frequency of one every 3 minutes on the shared section and every 4.5 minutes along the branches. Off-peak service frequencies range between 6 and 9 minutes.

== History ==
The line was planned during the 1930s by the Fascist government to provide a rapid transit connection between the central train station, Termini, and E42, a newly designed district to the south-west. This district was intended as the venue for the Universal Exposition (Expo) scheduled for 1942. However, the exposition was canceled following Italy's entry into World War II in 1940. When construction was halted, several tunnels in the city center (between Termini and Piramide) had already been completed and were subsequently utilized as air-raid shelters.

Construction resumed in 1948, coinciding with the redevelopment of the former Expo site into a commercial and residential area under the name Esposizione Universale Roma (EUR). The line was officially inaugurated on 9 February 1955 by President Luigi Einaudi, with regular public services beginning the following day.

Following the opening of a new east–west line in 1980 from Anagnina to Ottaviano, that network was designated as Line A, while the original Termini-Laurentina axis was renamed Line B.

In 1990, Line B was modernized and extended from Termini eastward to Rebibbia. On 13 June 2012, a new spur known as B1 opened from Bologna to Conca d'Oro. This branch was further extended to its current terminus at Jonio on 21 April 2015.

On 16 December 2025, a major connection to the network was established when Line C was extended to Colosseo, turning the station into a key interchange hub.

=== Opening dates ===
- 9 February 1955: Termini – Laurentina
- 8 December 1990: Termini – Rebibbia
- 13 June 2012: Bologna – Conca d'Oro (B1 spur)
- 21 April 2015: Conca d'Oro – Jonio (B1 spur extension)

== Extensions ==
Future extensions have been planned for both branches of the line:

- B1 Branch: Plans exist for an extension beyond Jonio toward the Bufalotta district near the Grande Raccordo Anulare (GRA).
- Main Line: In early 2026, the city administration approved the official planning document (DOCFAP) to extend the line eastward from Rebibbia. The project includes 6 new planned stations: San Basilio, Torraccia, Casal Monastero, Tecnopolo, Settecamini, and a new terminus at Setteville.

== Rolling stock ==
Upon its opening in 1955, Line B operated MR100 and MR200 trainsets (collectively known as Automotrice Stanga-TIBB). These were transferred to the Rome–Lido railway in 1987 and replaced by Series MB100 trains to handle growing passenger volumes from the Rebibbia extension.

Since 2010, the network has integrated newer CAF MA300 stock, supplemented since 2014 by MB400 Series trainsets similar to those deployed on Line A.

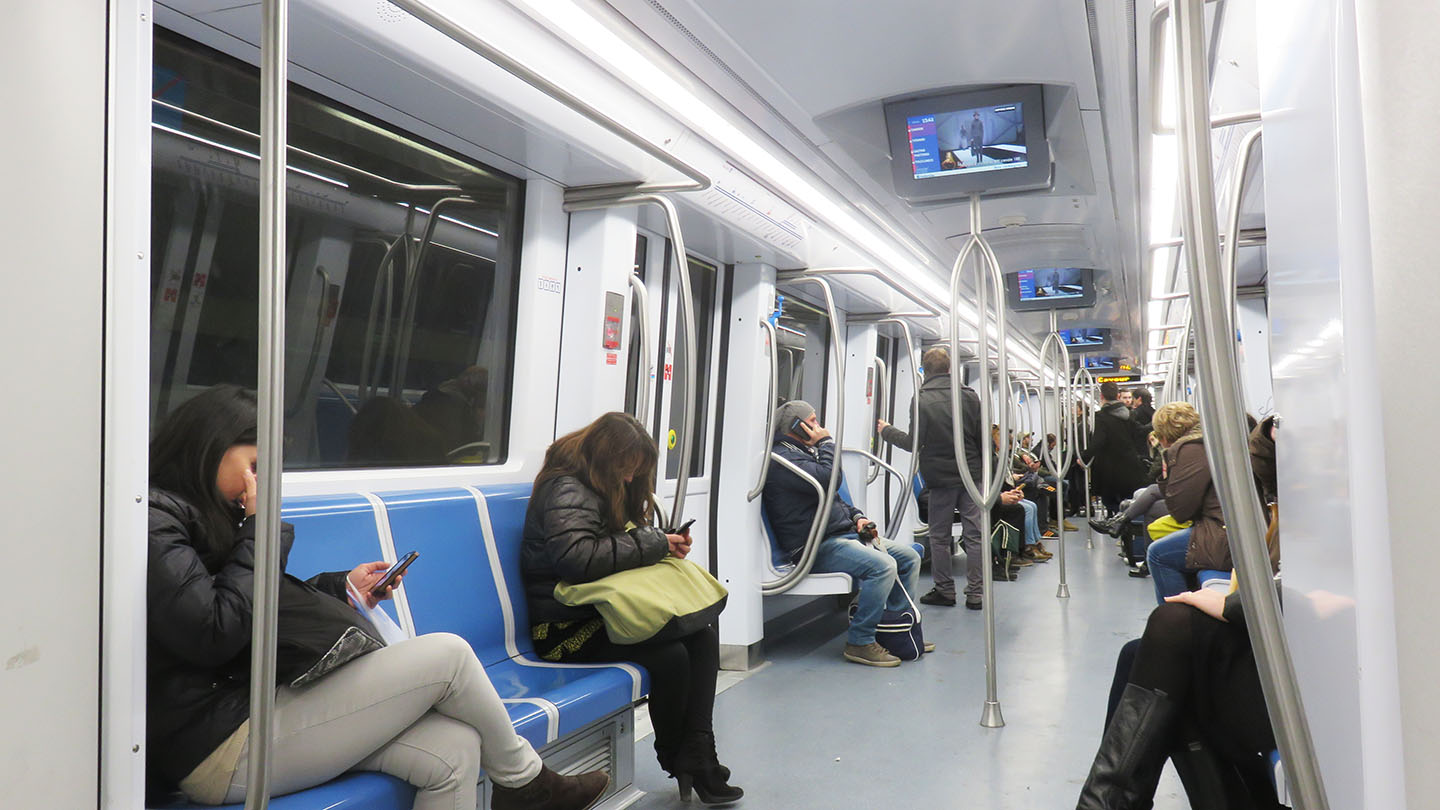
Interior of Line B train

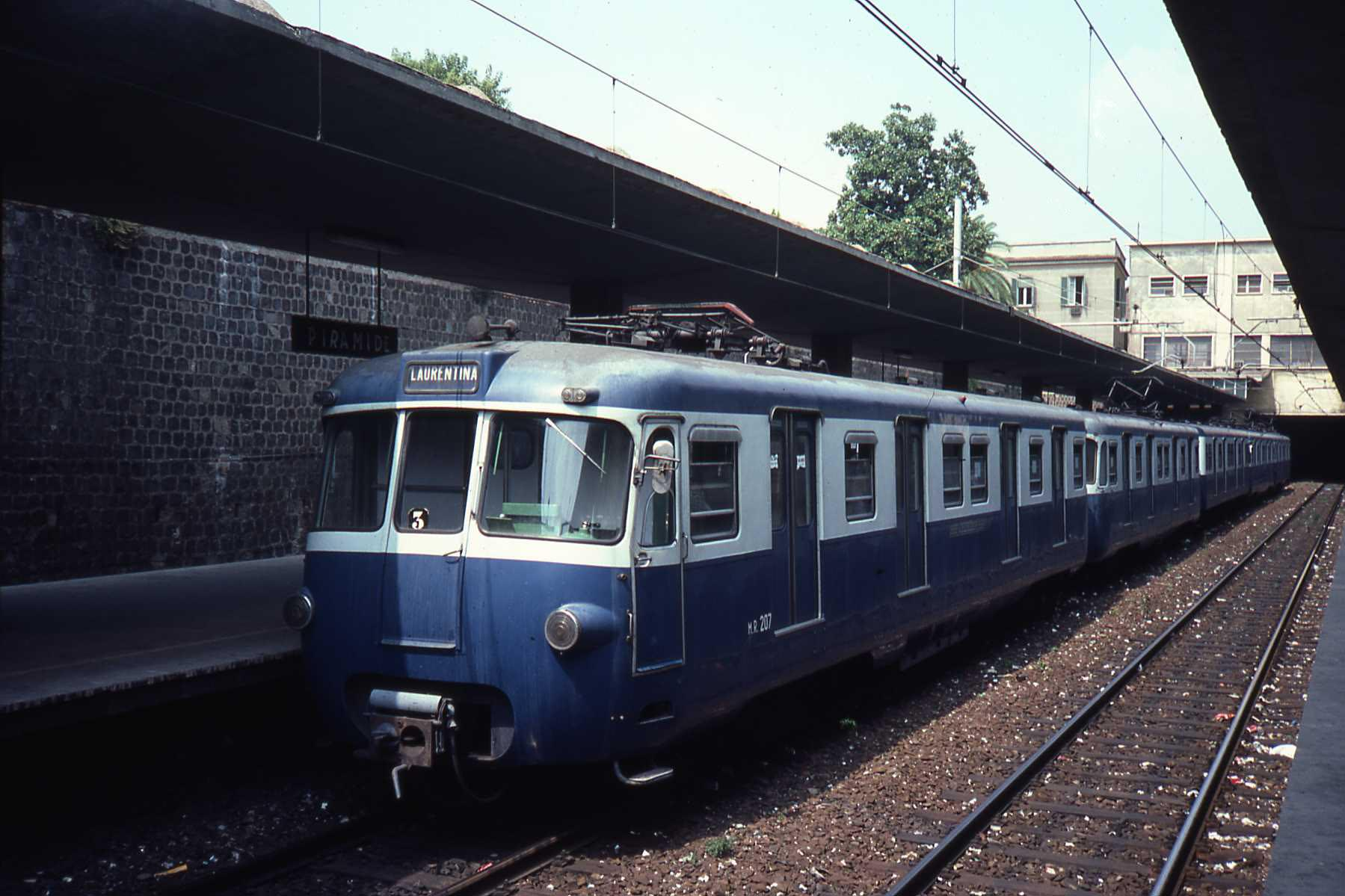
MR200 train at Piramide in 1984

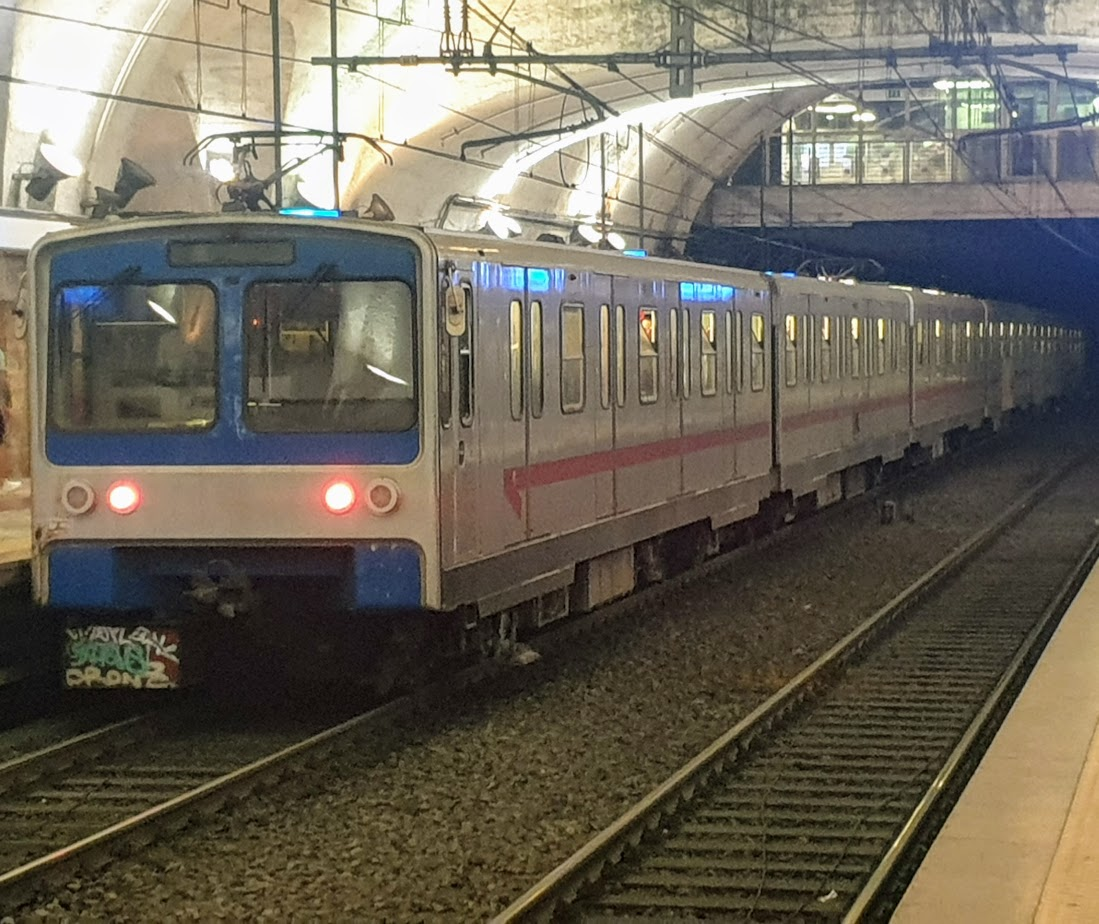
A side view of the 1990 built MB100 cars at Termini

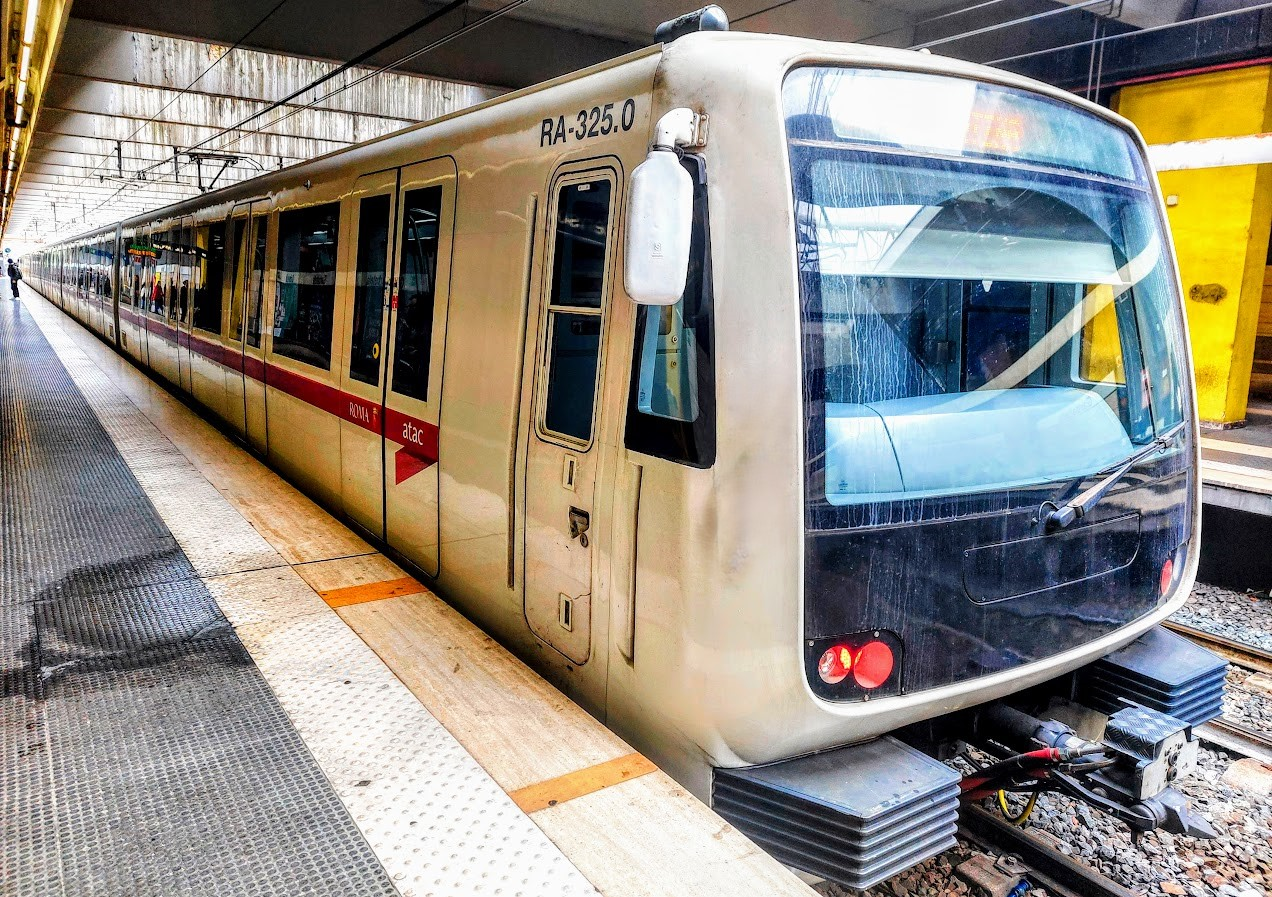
CAF S/300 MA300 in service on line B at Garbatella

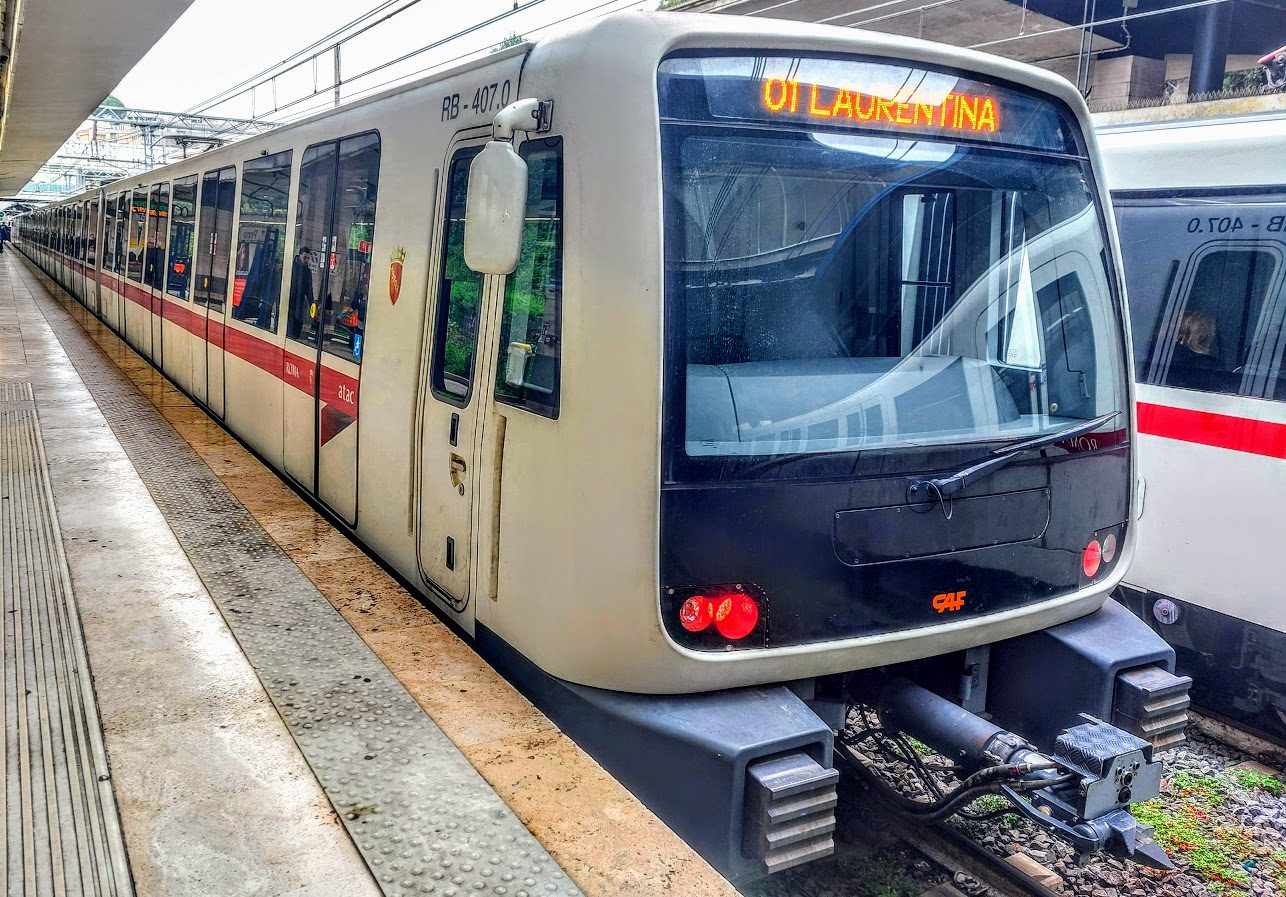
CAF S/300 MB400 in service on line B at Piramide

== Statistics ==
Year	2014	2015	2016	2017	2018	2019	2020	2021	2022	2023	2024
Passengers (millions)	83.45	78.81	74.00	74.91	80.54	79.74	35.11	38.91	50.09	57.16	62.34

== Stations ==
Metro Line B in Rome

=== Gallery ===
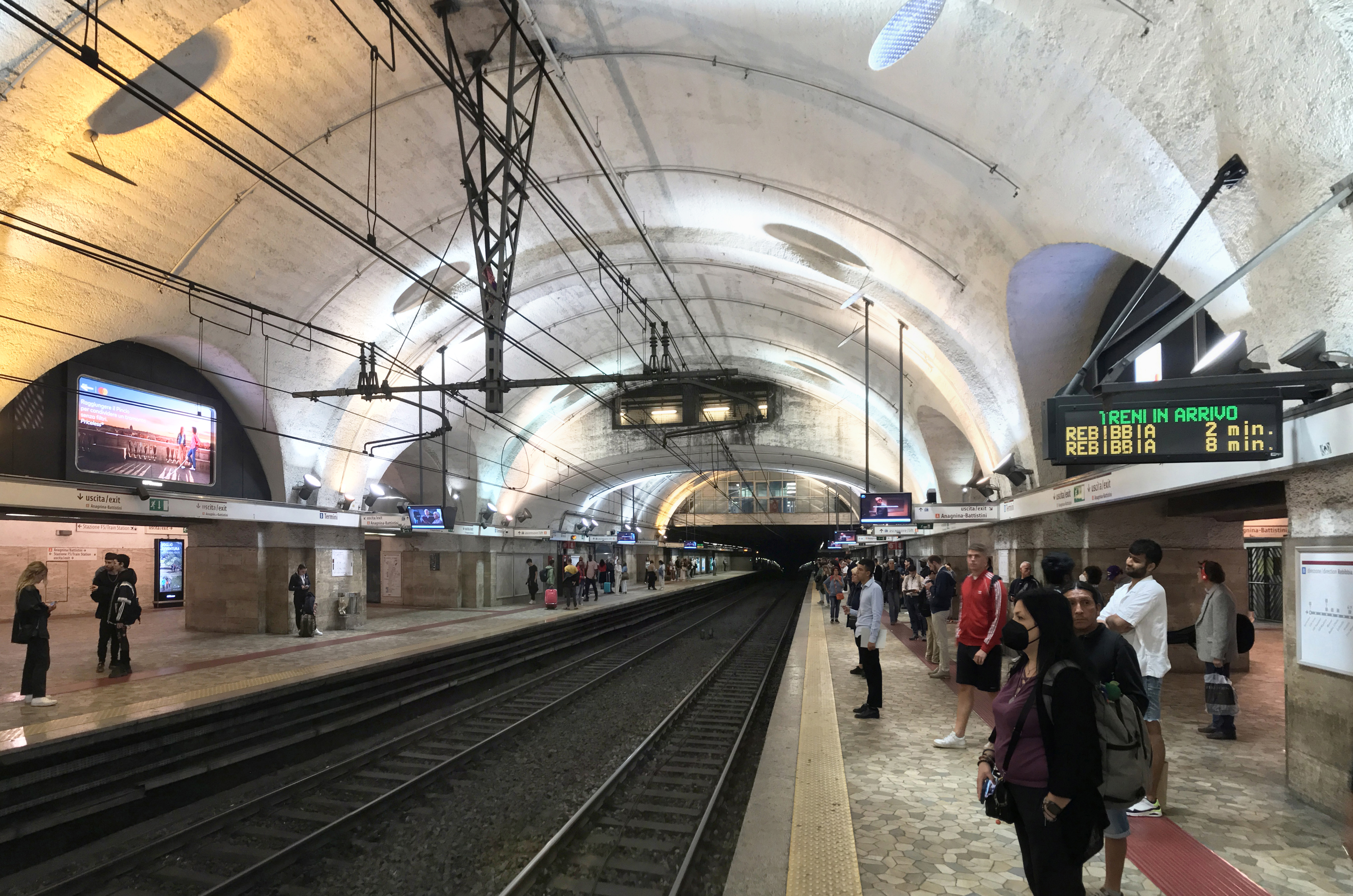
Termini

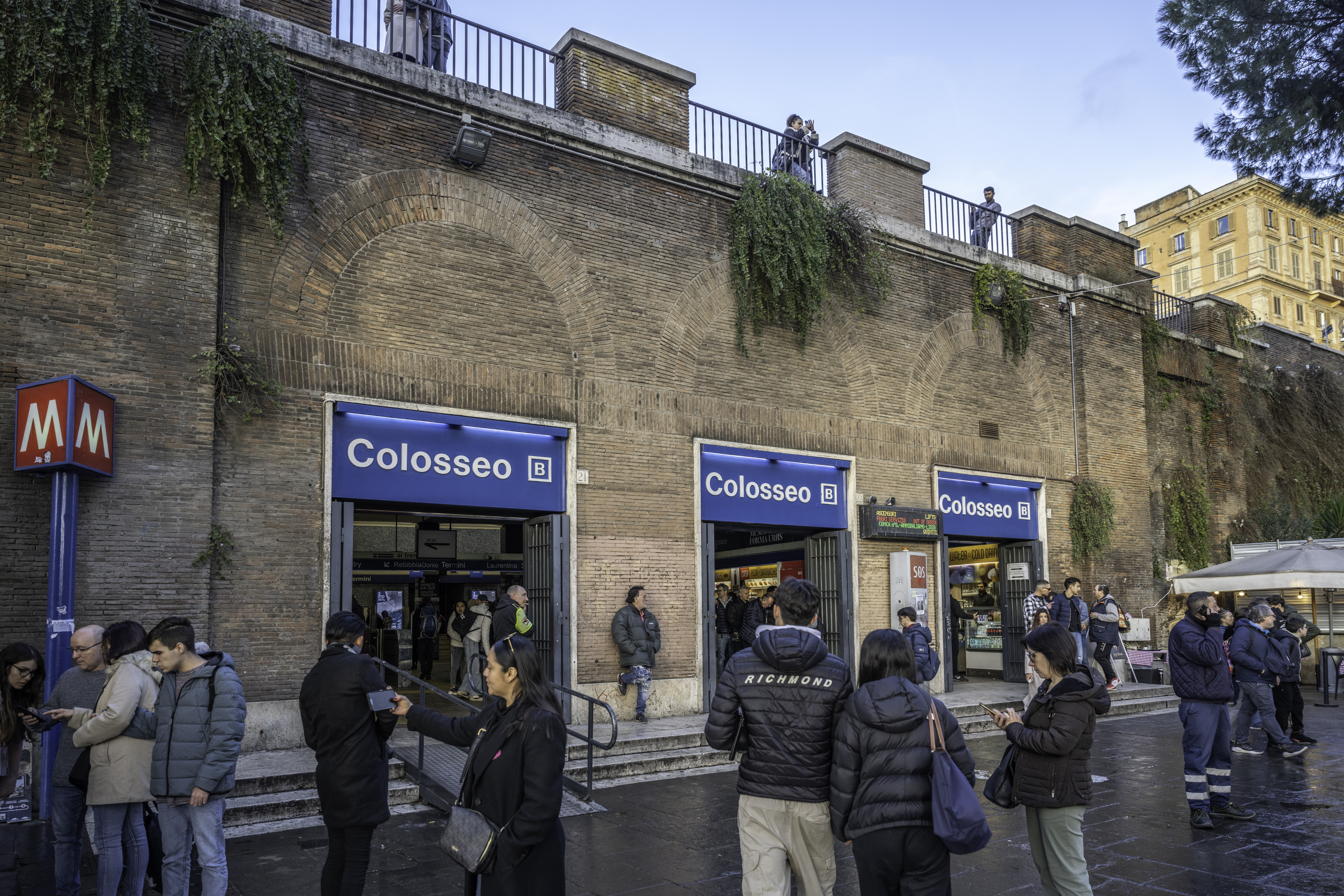
Colosseo

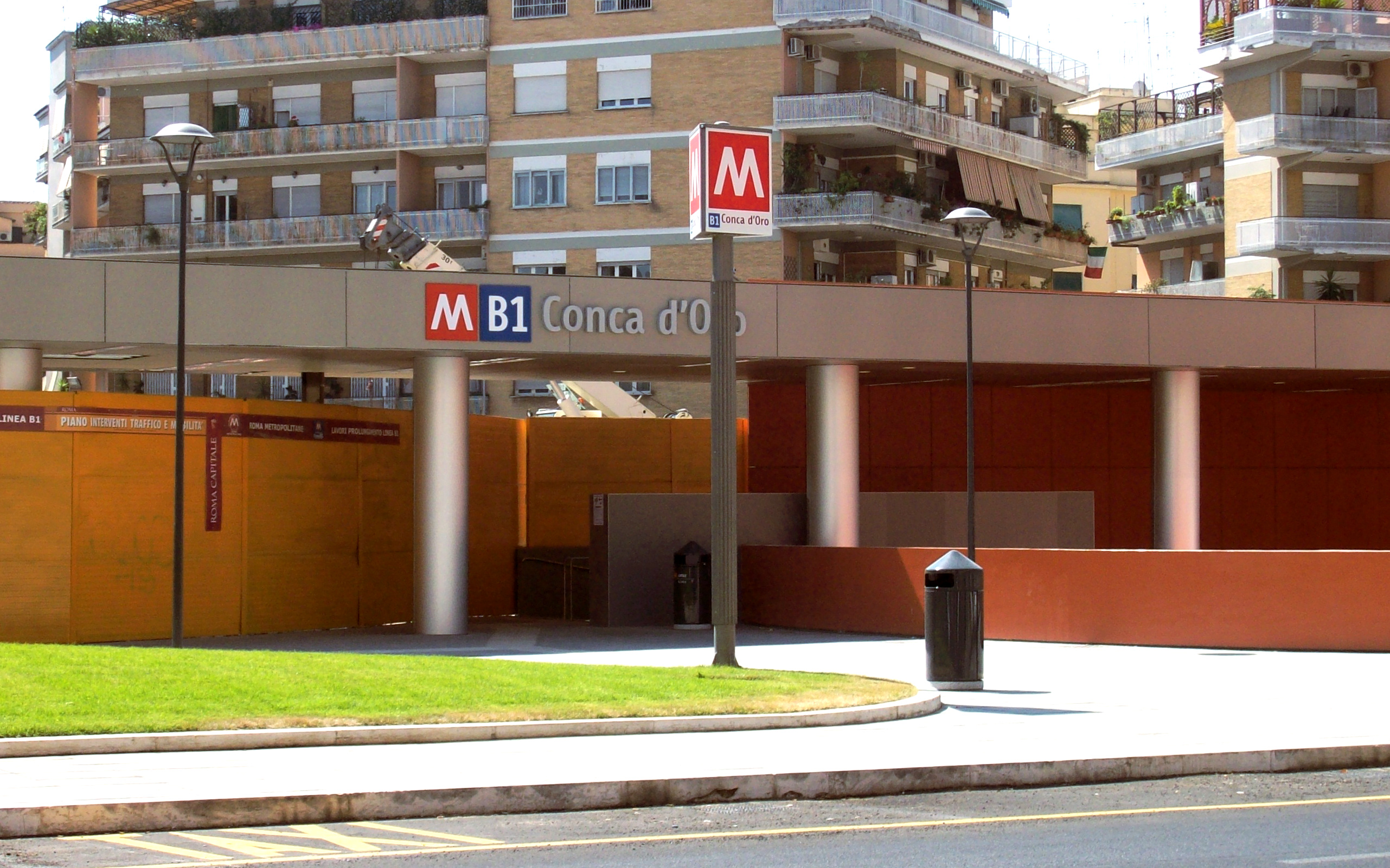
Conca d'Oro

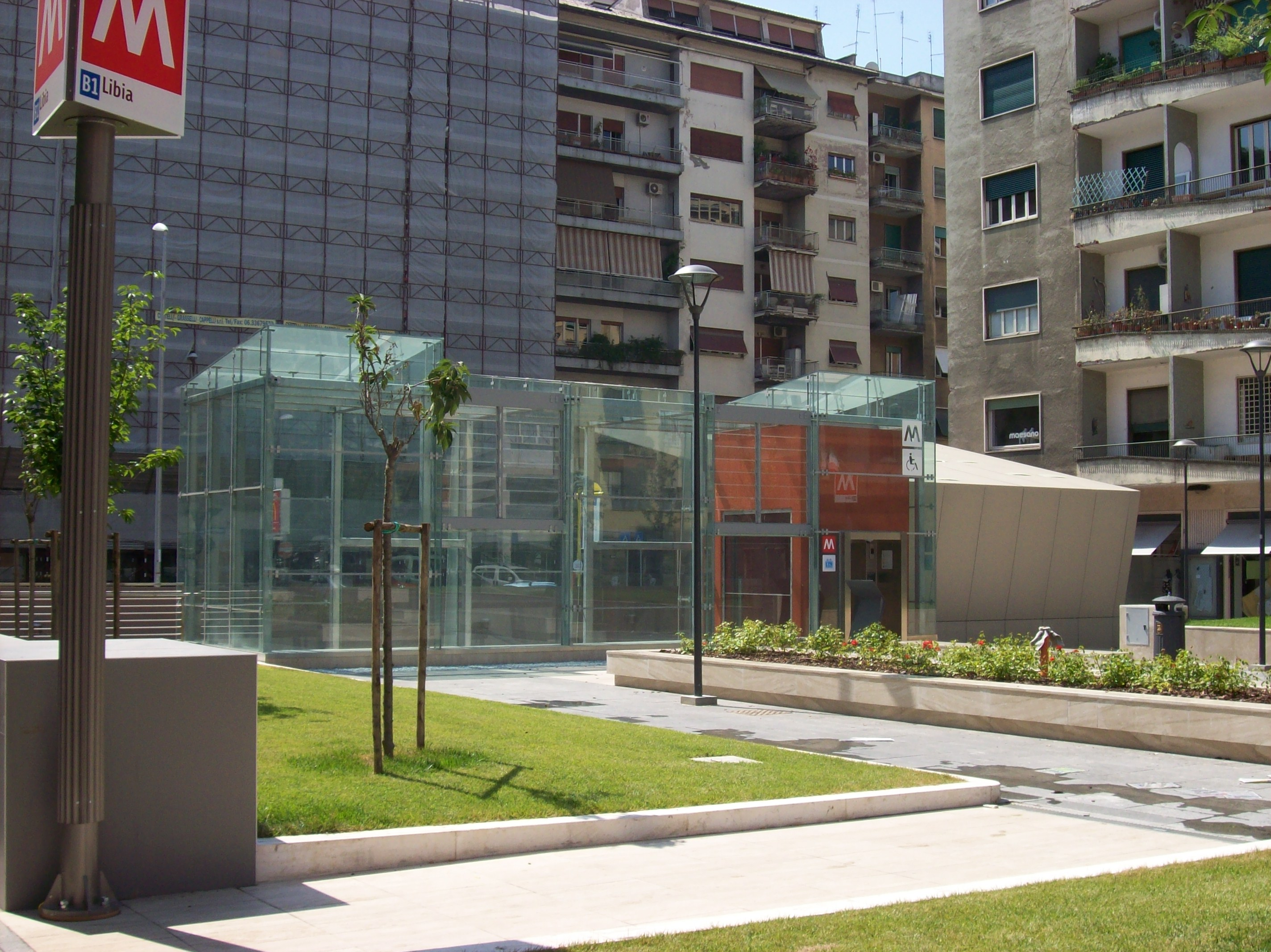
Libia

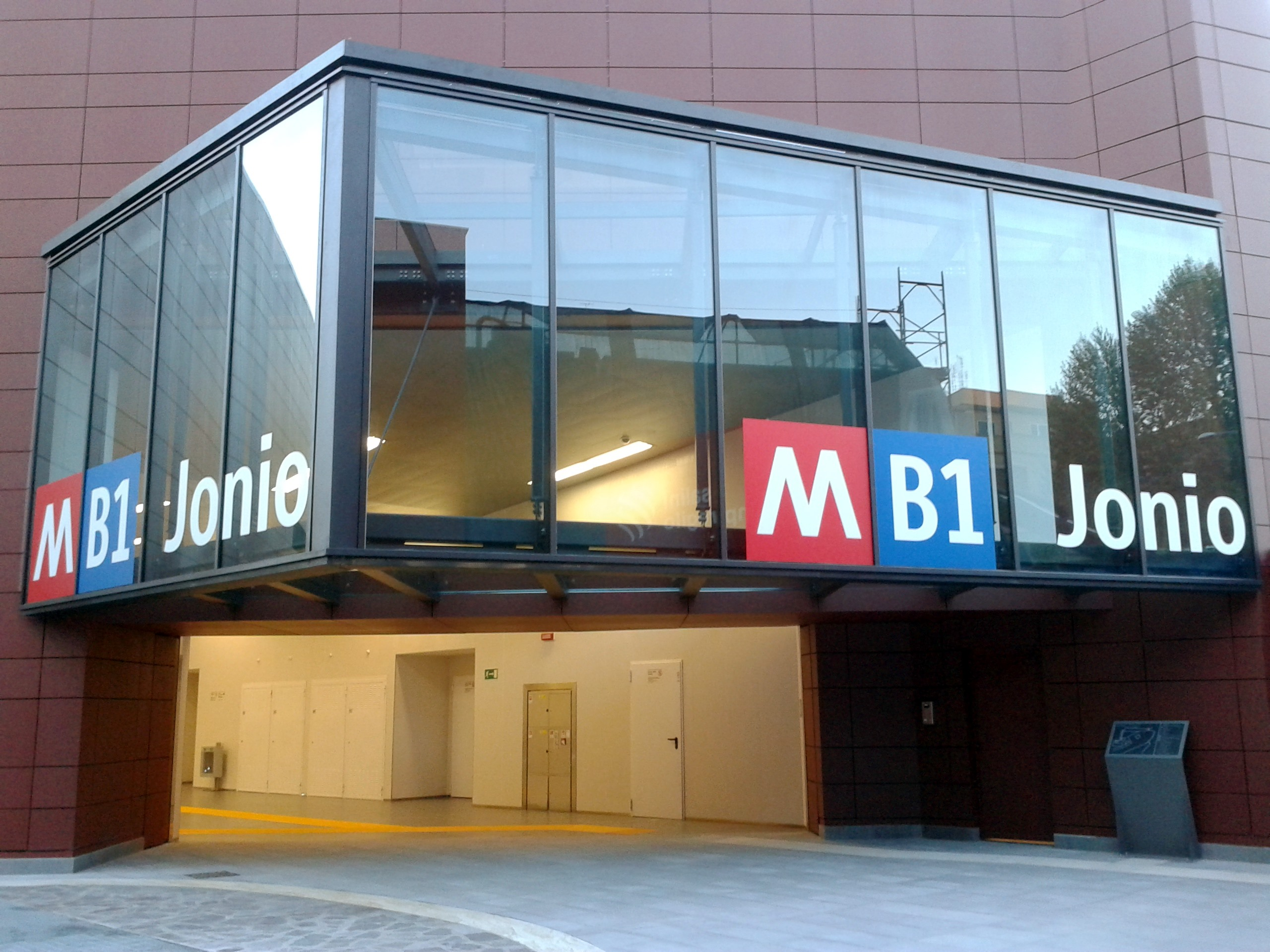
Jonio

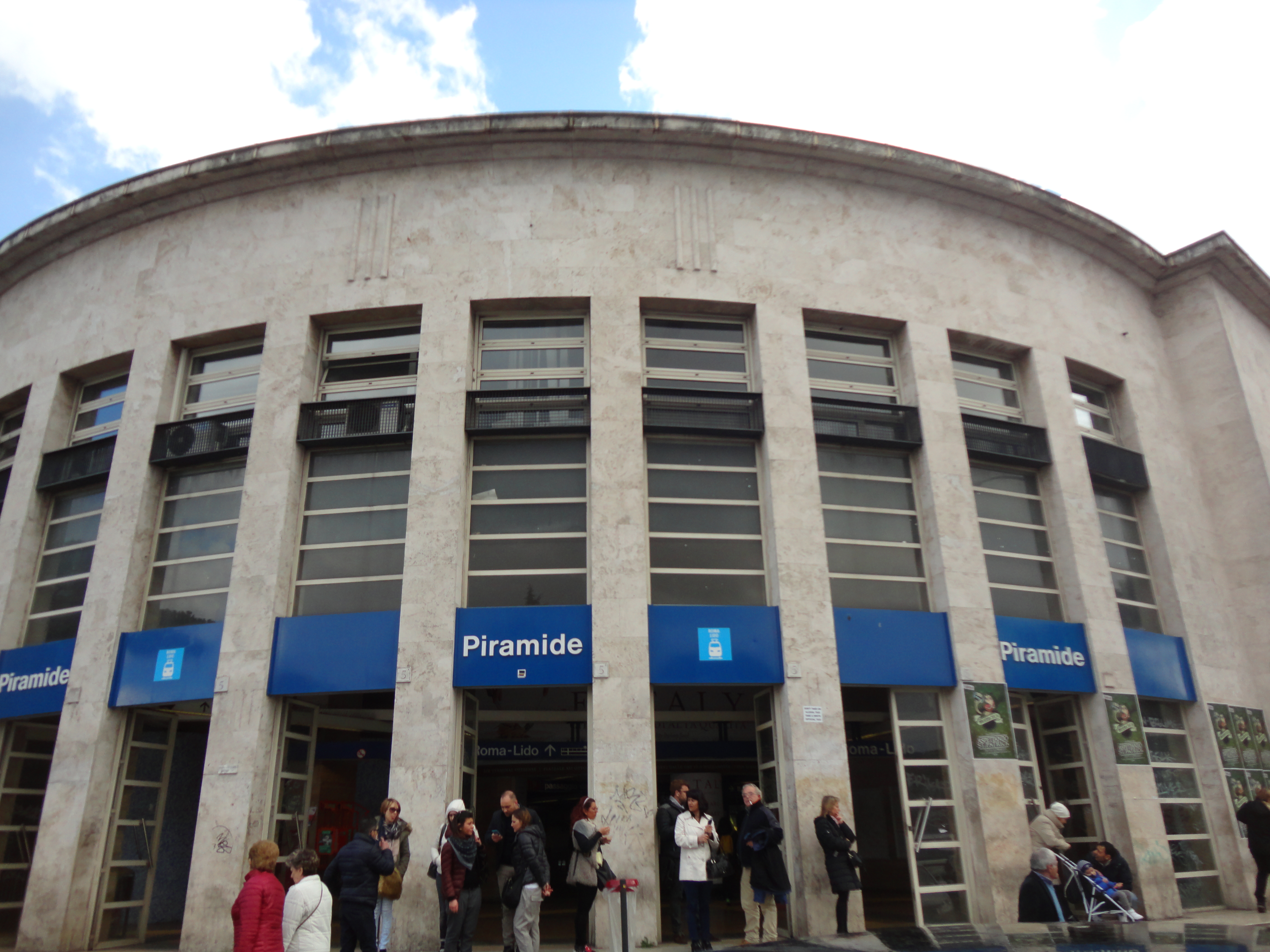
Piramide

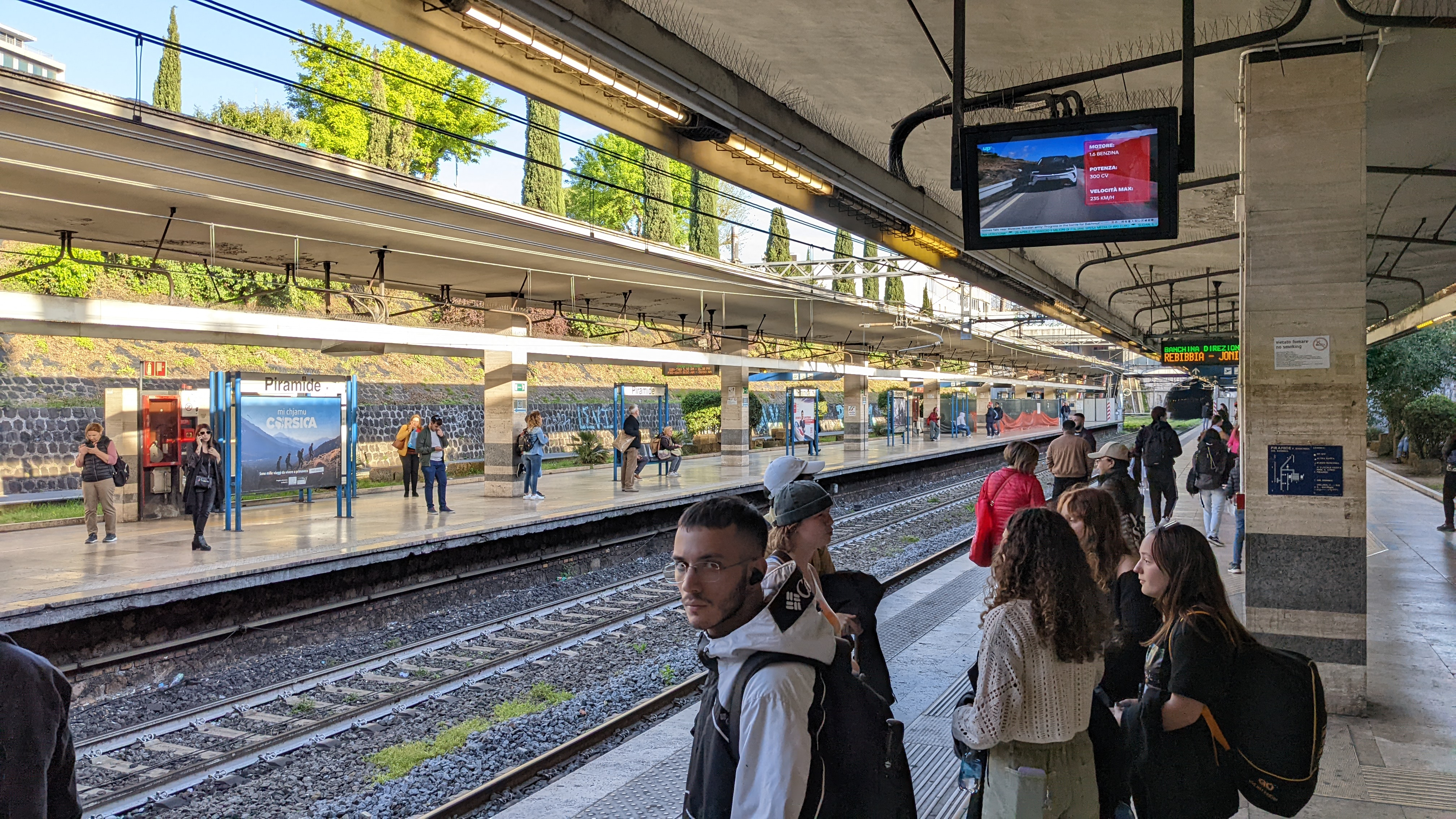
Piramide

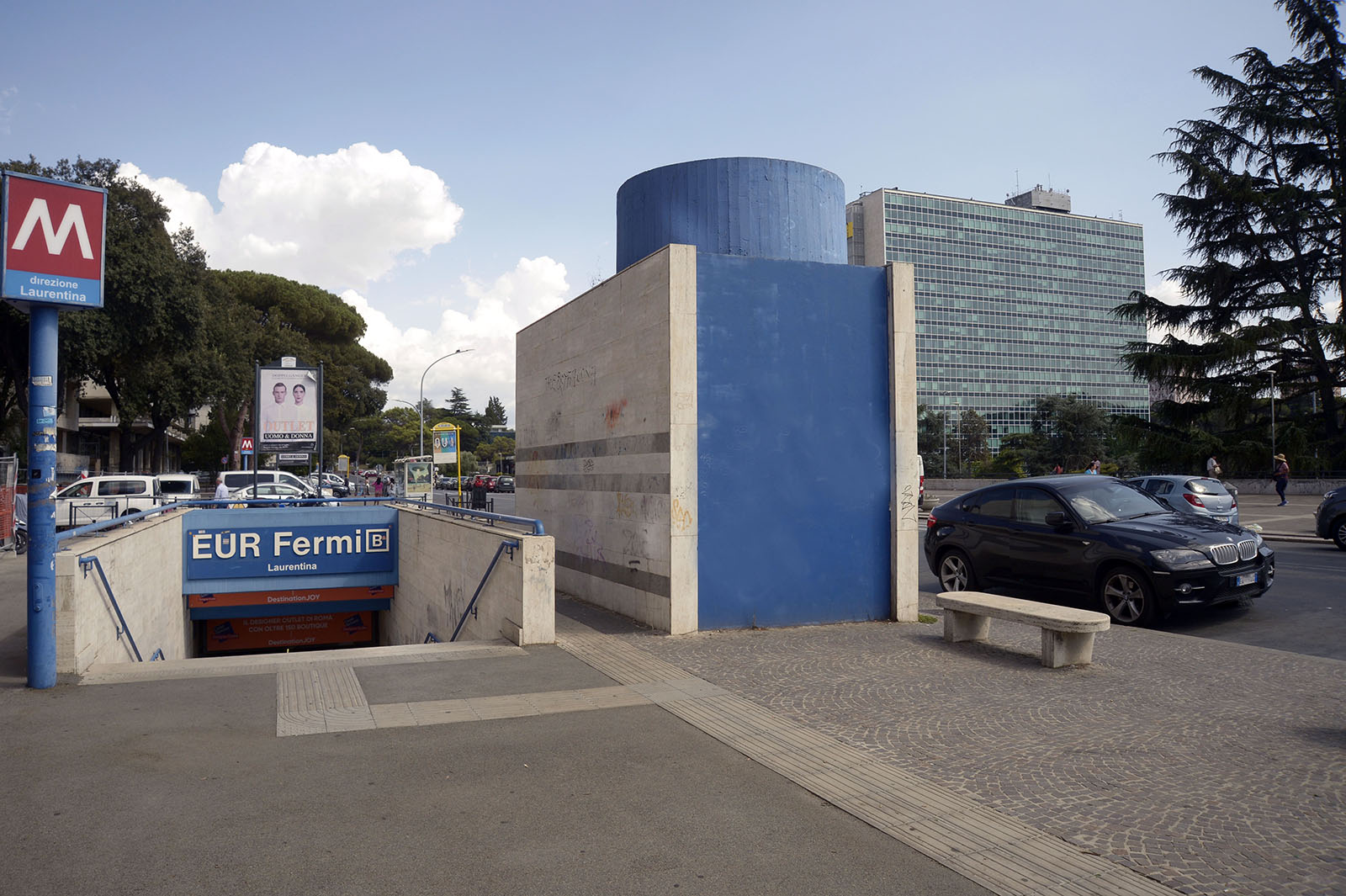
EUR Fermi

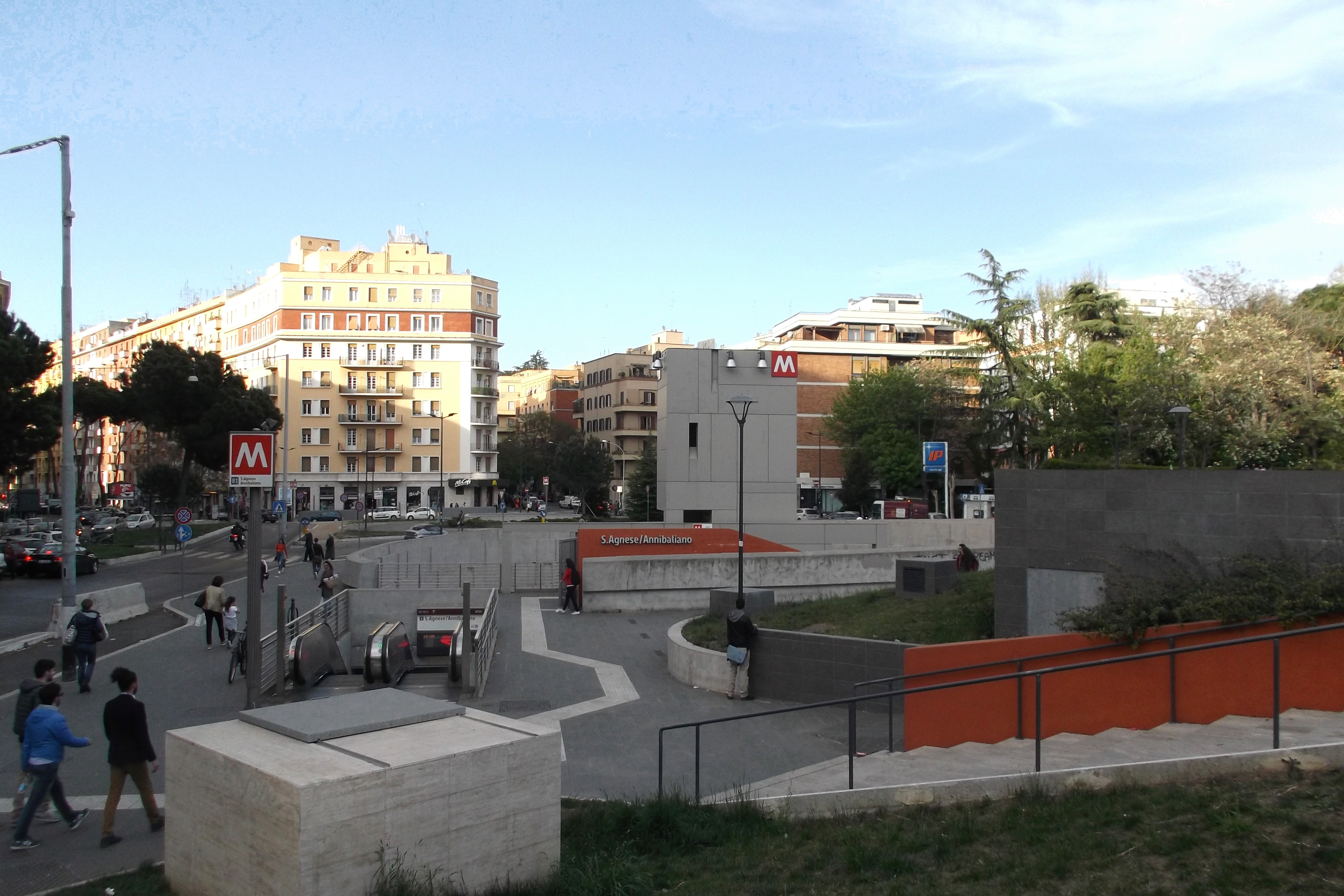
Sant'Agnese-Annibaliano
