= Rome Metro =

Rapid transit system in Rome, Italy

- Metropolitana di Roma logo
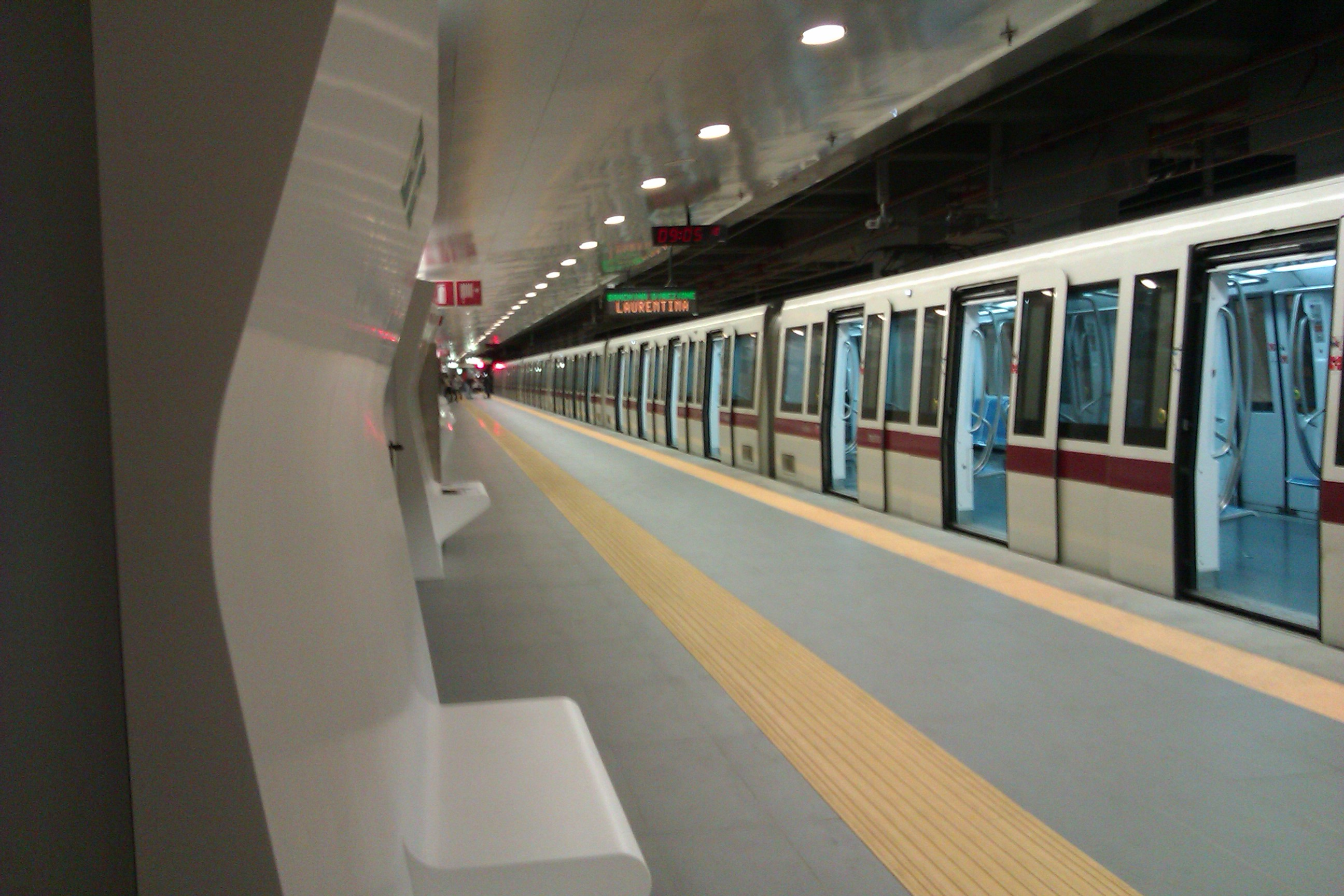
- An S300 train at Conca d'Oro station

Overview
- Native name: Metropolitana di Roma
- Locale: Rome, Italy
- Transit type: Rapid transit
- Number of lines: 3
- Number of stations: 74 (additional 7 under construction) (Note: This count includes Termini, the interchange station between Lines A and B, San Giovanni, the interchange station between Lines A and C, and Colosseo, the interchange station between Lines B and C, only once.)
- Daily ridership: 819,421 (2019)
- Annual ridership: 320 million (2019)
- Website: ATAC S.p.A.

Operation
- Began operation: 9 February 1955; 71 years ago
- Operator: ATAC
- Number of vehicles: 83 trains

Technical
- System length: 62 km (39 mi)
- Track gauge: 1,435 mm (4 ft 8 1/2 in) standard gauge
- Electrification: 1,500 V DC (Overhead lines)
System map

The Rome Metro (Italian: Metropolitana di Roma) is a rapid transit system that operates in Rome, Italy. It started operation in 1955, making it the oldest in the country.

The Metro comprises three lines―A (orange), B (blue) and C (green)―which operate on 62 km (39 mi) of route, serving 74 stations. It has a daily ridership of approximately 820,000 passengers and has an annual traffic of approximately 320 million passengers.

In addition to the Metro, the centre of Rome and its urban area are served by eight FL lines (672 km (417.5 mi) with 131 stations) that surround Rome and the Lazio region, six tram lines (36 km (22 mi) with 192 stations), three commuter urban lines (135 km (83.8 mi) with 57 stations), the Leonardo Express, which connects Roma Termini, the central station of the city, to the Leonardo da Vinci Airport of Fiumicino, and the Civitavecchia Express, which connects the city to the main port of Rome, the Port of Civitavecchia. Network extensions are currently under construction on Line C (station Venezia is expected to open in 2033). There are further projects for Line A, Line B, Rome–Giardinetti and for the suburban rail system. The entire transport system in Rome uses the Metrebus integrated tariff system (an acronym composed of the words "Metro", "Treno" and "Bus"), which can be used within the limits of the Municipality of Rome and within the limits of the urban tariff.

Line B was the first metro line inaugurated in the system, and the first official metro in Italy, but the names 'A' and 'B' were only added when the second line opened 25 years after the first. Inaugurated in post-war Italy in 1955 during the reconstruction and on the verge of the Italian economic miracle, it was designed and built for the 1942 universal exhibition (Esposizione Universale Roma, which is now the current business centre of Rome) desired by the fascist regime, which never took place due to the outbreak of the World War II.

== Lines ==
Line	Termini		Opened	Newest extension	Length		Stations
Line	Termini		Opened	Newest extension	km	mi	Stations
Line A (Rome Metro)	Battistini	Anagnina	1980	2000	18.4	11.4	27
Line B (Rome Metro)	Laurentina	Rebibbia / Jonio	1955	2015	22.9	14.2	26
Line C (Rome Metro)	Monte Compatri-Pantano	Colosseo	2014	2025	20.7	12.9	24

=== Line A ===
Line A runs from the southeastern suburbs of Rome, then along the northeast section of downtown, and then to the northern section of the city, near Vatican City. It connects with Line B, along with many other national and regional rail services, at Termini, and with Line C at San Giovanni. It has 27 stations, with terminals at Battistini and Anagnina. It is identified by the colour orange.

Line A was the second line built in Rome. Approval was given for the construction of the city's second Metro line in 1959.

Work on Line A began in 1964 in the Tuscolana area, but it experienced a series of delays because the originally planned cut-and-cover method of construction posed serious problems for road traffic in southeast Rome. Work on the Metro was suspended and began again five years later, using bored tunnels, which partially resolved the traffic problems but caused numerous claims for compensation for vibrations caused by the machines. Work was also frequently interrupted by archaeological finds made during the excavations, particularly near Piazza della Repubblica.

Line A entered service in February 1980. In the late 1990s, it was extended from Ottaviano, in the Prati district, to Battistini to the west.

Since June 2022, the station of Valle Aurelia, on Line A, has been connected with the reactivated railway station of Vigna Clara. The Vigna Clara-Valle Aurelia section is a relevant step to close the railway ring in North Rome because of the connection with the Line A, Line B (Ostiense) and the FL3 suburban line to Viterbo.

=== Line B ===
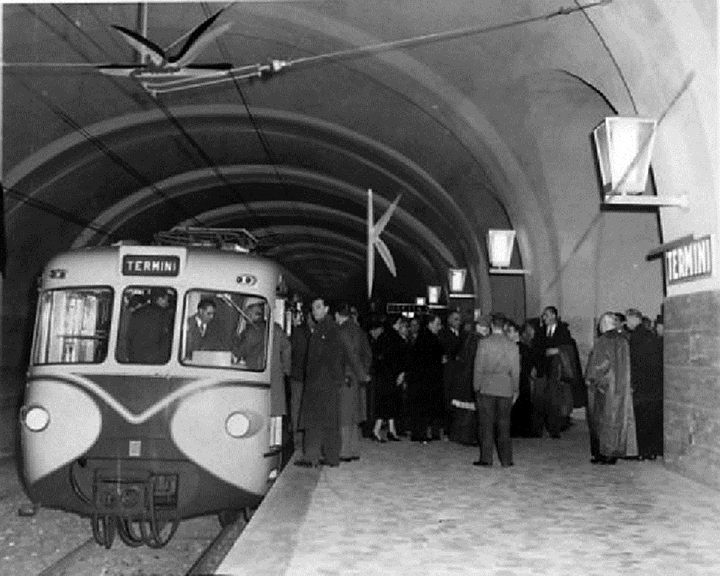
Inauguration of the metro in 1955

Line B was the first Metro line in Rome. Line B connects the northeast of the city with the southwest. It has 26 stations with terminals at Rebibbia, Jonio and Laurentina (just east of EUR). It is identified by the colour blue. Transfers are available with Line A and other rail services at Termini station.

Line B was planned during the 1930s by the fascist government to provide a rapid connection between the main train station, Termini, and a new district to the southeast of the city, E42, the planned location of the Universal Exposition (or Expo), which was to be held in Rome in 1942. The exposition never took place due to Italy's entry into the Second World War in 1940. When its construction was interrupted, some of the tunnels on the city-centre side of the Metro (between Termini and Piramide) had already been completed, and they were used as air raid shelters during the war.

Work restarted in 1948, together with the development of the site formerly designated for the Expo into a residential and business district under the name EUR. The Metro was officially opened on 9 February 1955 by the then President of the Republic, Luigi Einaudi. Regular services began the following day.

In 1990, Line B was extended from Termini to Rebibbia in the east of the city and the entire line was modernised. A new 4 km (2.5 mi) long branch (B1) was opened connecting Piazza Bologna with Conca d'Oro on 13 June 2012; the branch's last stop (and new terminus), Jonio, was opened on 21 April 2015.

=== Line C ===
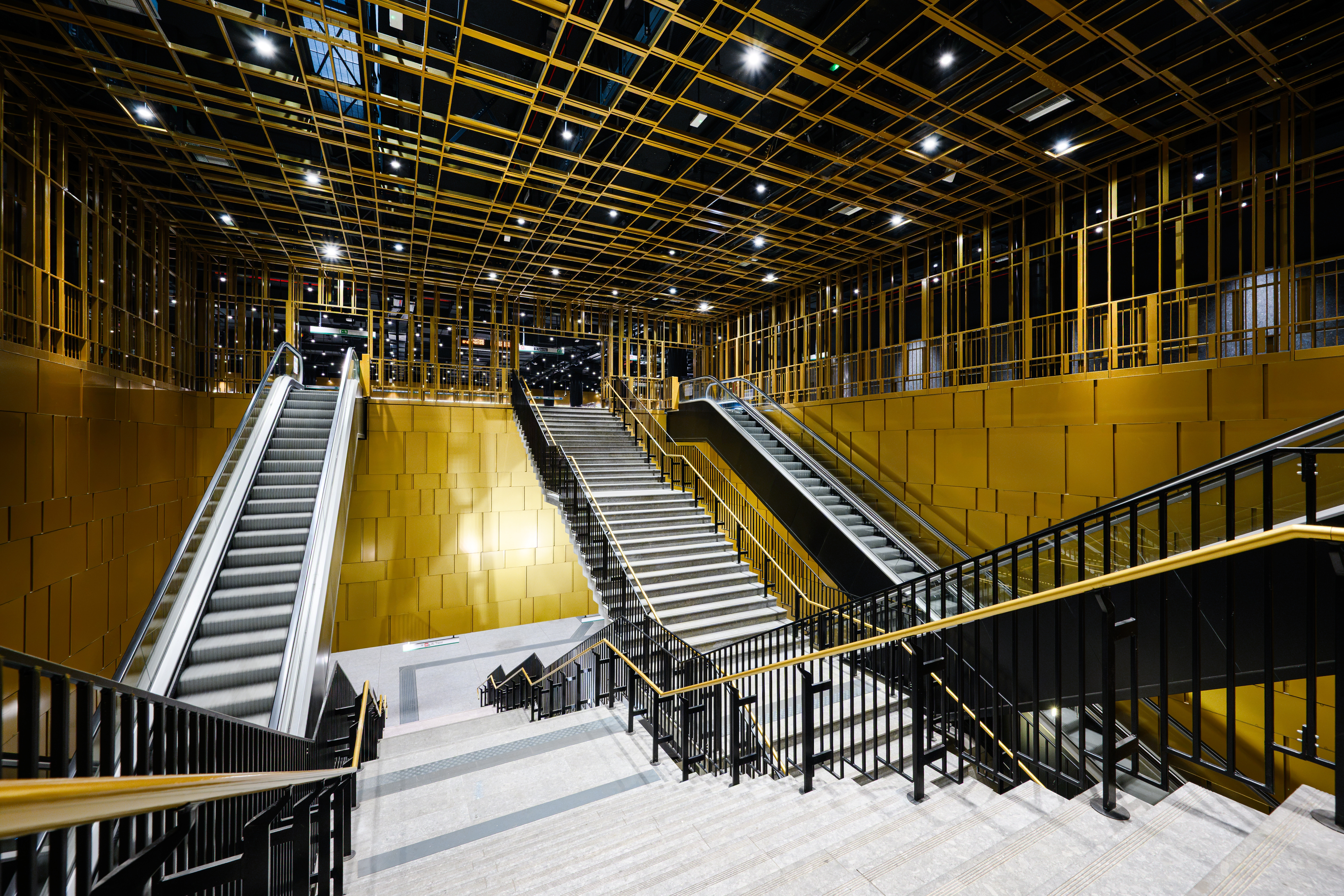
Colosseo station

Opened on 9 November 2014, line C currently runs radially from Colosseo, serving as an interchange station for Line B, to the eastern terminus of Pantano (the former terminus of the Roma–Giardinetti light railway). It is the first Metro line to extend beyond the city boundaries in Rome.

It is planned to extend to the northwest, towards Grottarossa (north of the Vatican), via the city centre; it will also intersect with Line A at Ottaviano (beside the Vatican), and with the planned Line D at Piazza Venezia, thus creating a fourth Metro hub in Rome. The first section of the line, from Centocelle to Pantano, is the furthest from the city centre and includes 15 of the planned 30 stops. A further 5.4-kilometre (3.4 mi) section of Line C, serving six additional stations, opened on 29 June 2015, as the line's western terminus was moved from Parco di Centocelle to Lodi. On 12 May 2018, the western terminus was moved to San Giovanni (interchange station for line A). After this third phase, the line will be further extended with three stations, Porta Metronia, Colosseo, and Piazza Venezia, located in the city centre.

Progress on the line has been slow with projected completion dates being repeatedly delayed. Rome is one of the oldest cities in the world, and as such, the construction of the Metro system has encountered considerable obstacles owing to frequent archaeological discoveries. While the excavation of the tunnels themselves can be undertaken well below the probable location of most archaeological finds, the excavation of stairwells and ventilation shafts – which must, by necessity, connect with the surface – pose considerable difficulties.

The trains operating on line C are completely automated, and use the same AnsaldoBreda Driverless Metro system also featured on the Copenhagen Metro.

==== Archeostation ====
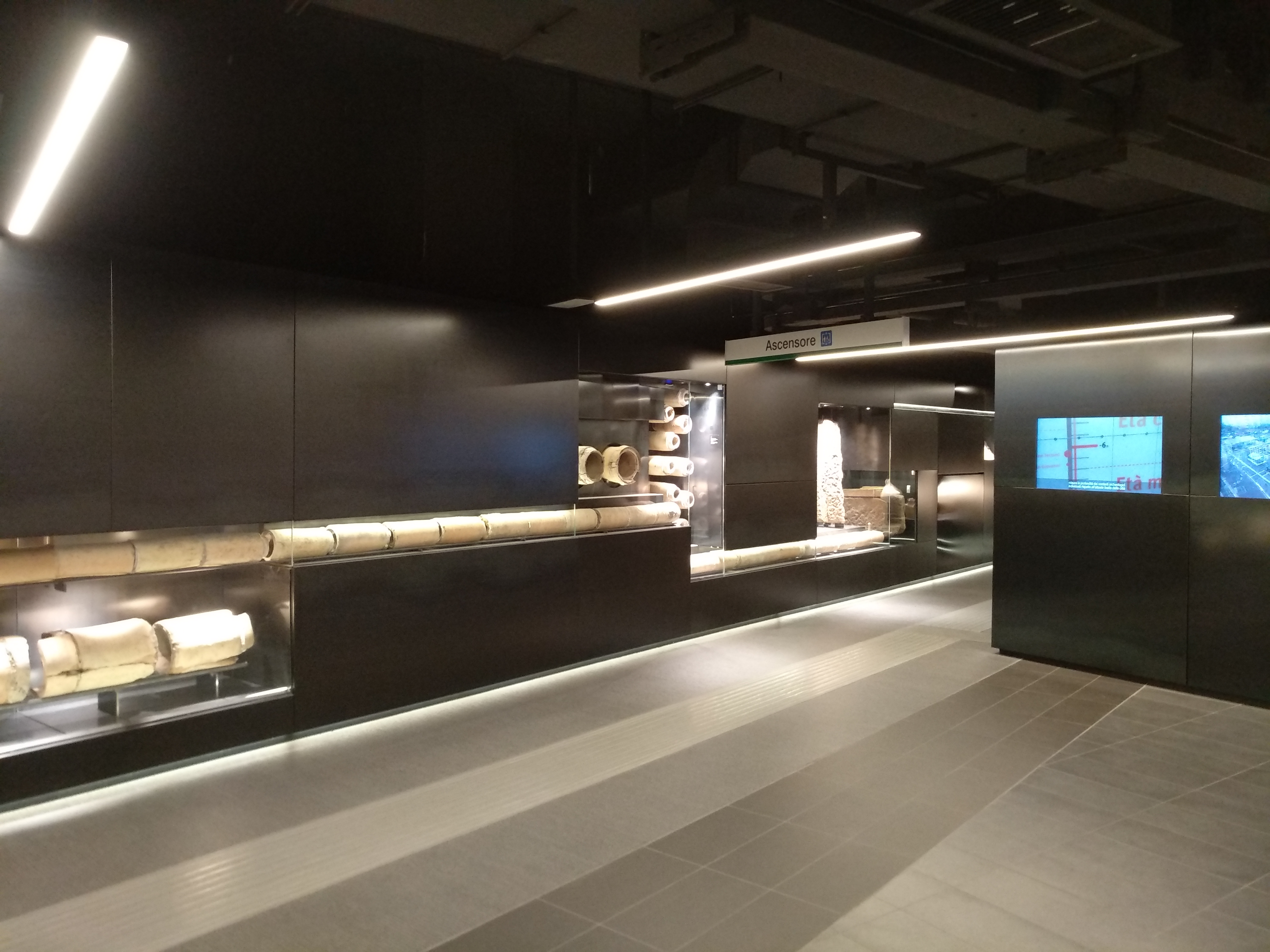
Archeostation San Giovanni.

During the excavation for the central route of line C, thanks to the archeological richness of Rome's ground a new type of underground station (combining archeological findings displays) was born, as in Paris with Louvre–Rivoli station.

San Giovanni station was the first archeostation to be opened on 12 May 2018. Excavation to a depth of about 20 metres (66 ft) allowed the exploration of about 21 stratifications of history up to the so-called virgin soil, the one in which man's presence is absent.

The exhibition is characterized by being a real tour with libraries for the finds along the route, explanatory panels on the walls and a temporal measurement of the historical phases that follows the path of the passengers from the atrium level to the platforms' level:

- Atrium level: from Contemporary Age to Late Antiquity Age
- First underground level: from Republican Age to Archaic Age
- Platform level: Prehistoric Age

The various archaeological finds and exhibits include small items such as gold jewelry, coins, crockery, shells, large amphorae and elements of ancient columns and also large finds, such as the large pool, the largest reservoir ever found, located inside a farm of the imperial age.

=== Timeline ===
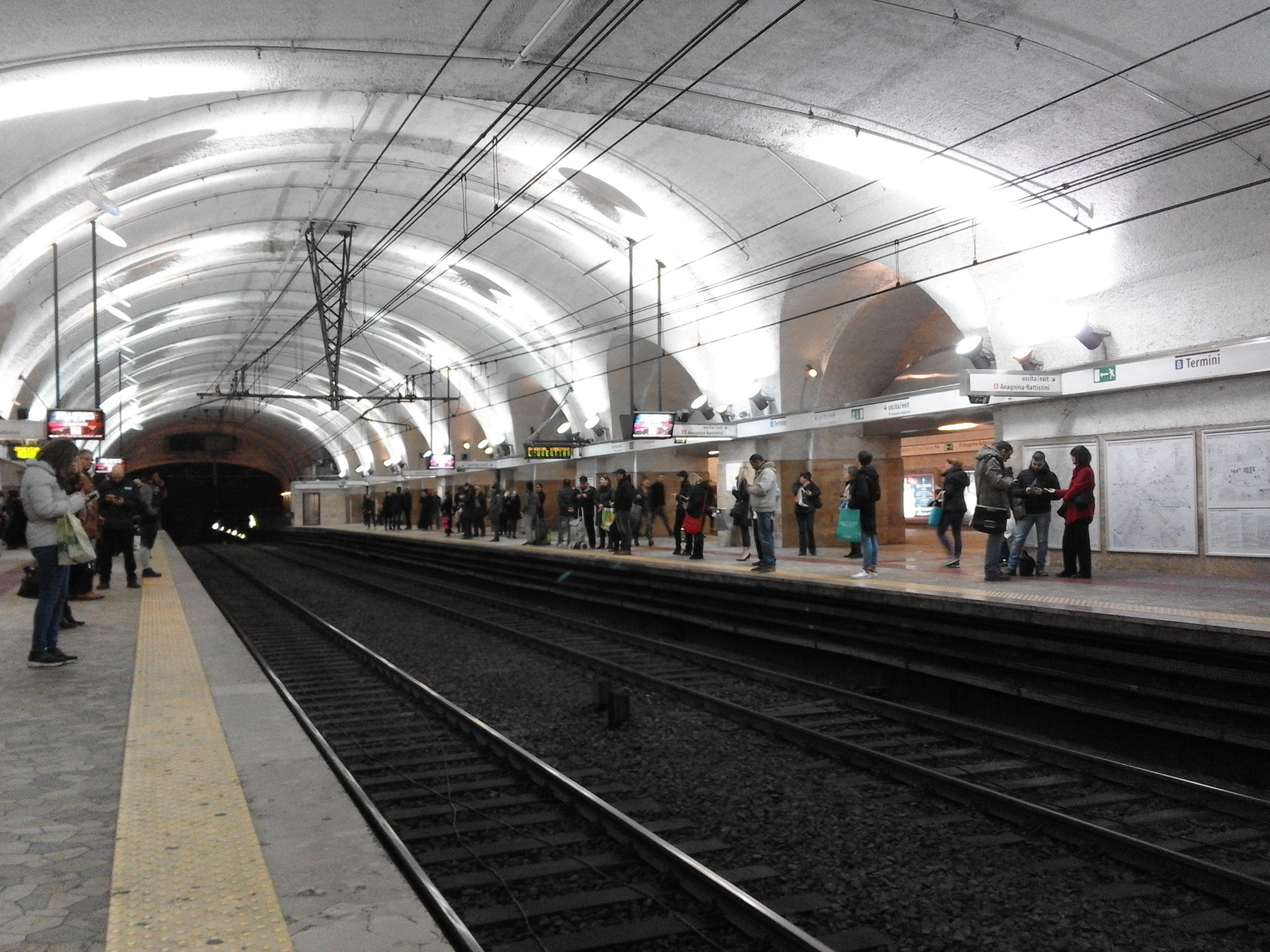
Line B Termini station, opened in 1955.

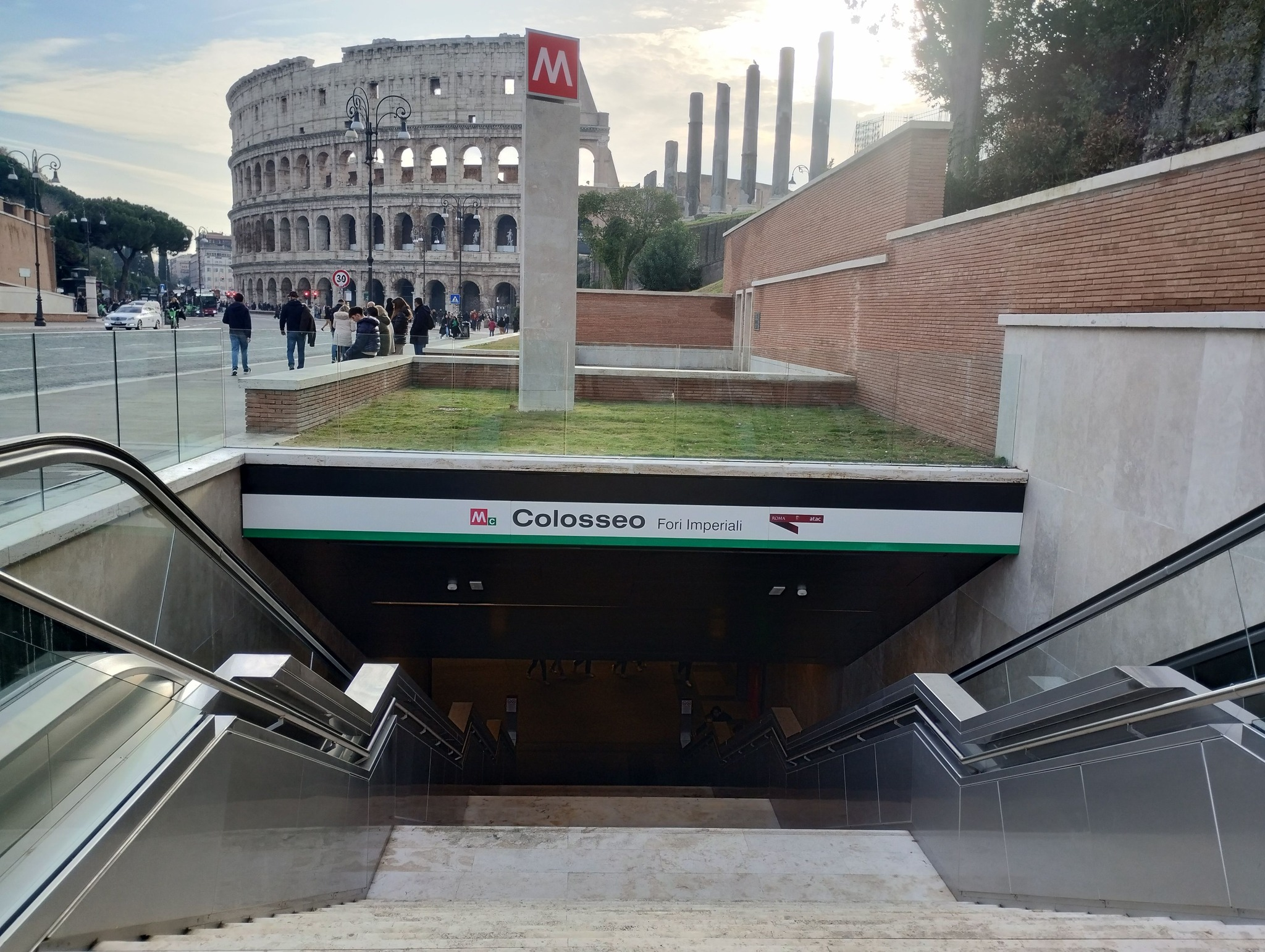
Line C Colosseo station, opened in 2025.

Timeline of Rome metro construction
date	section or station	line
10 February 1955	Termini – EUR Fermi	Line B (Rome Metro)
16 February 1980	Ottaviano – Cinecittà	Line A (Rome Metro)
11 June 1980	Cinecittà – Anagnina	Line A (Rome Metro)
8 December 1990	Termini – Rebibbia; Garbatella; Laurentina	Line B (Rome Metro)
12 March 1993	Marconi	Line B (Rome Metro)
13 December 1995	Ponte Mammolo	Line B (Rome Metro)
29 May 1999	Ottaviano – Valle Aurelia	Line A (Rome Metro)
1 January 2000	Valle Aurelia – Battistini	Line A (Rome Metro)
23 June 2003	Quintiliani	Line B (Rome Metro)
12 June 2012	Bologna – Conca d'Oro	Line B (Rome Metro)
9 November 2014	Monte Compatri-Pantano – Parco di Centocelle	Line C (Rome Metro)
21 April 2015	Conca d'Oro – Jonio	Line B (Rome Metro)
29 June 2015	Parco di Centocelle – Lodi	Line C (Rome Metro)
12 May 2018	Lodi – San Giovanni	Line C (Rome Metro)
16 December 2025	San Giovanni – Colosseo	Line C (Rome Metro)

== Rolling stock ==
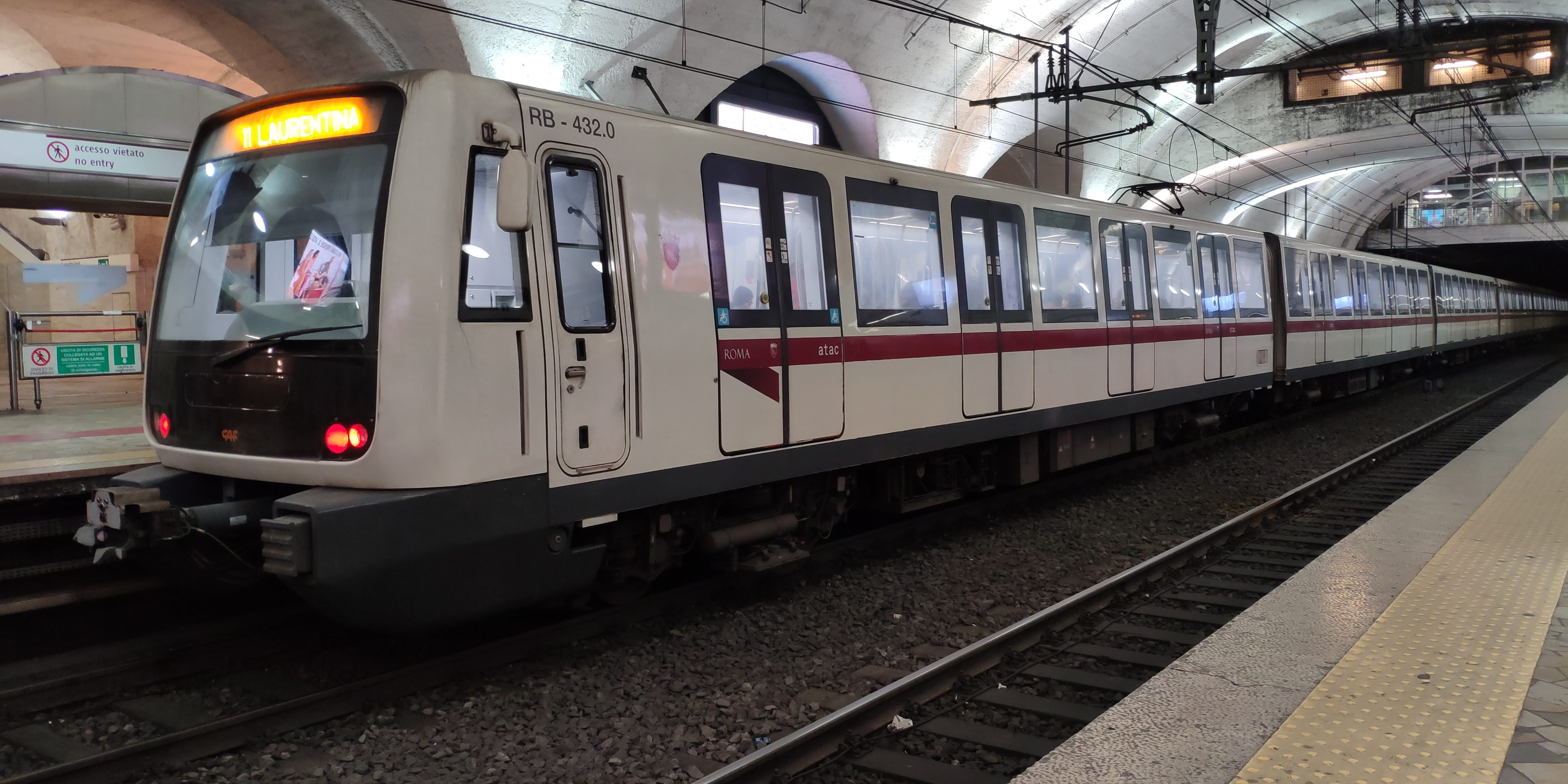
A CAF MB400 in service on line B in Termini station

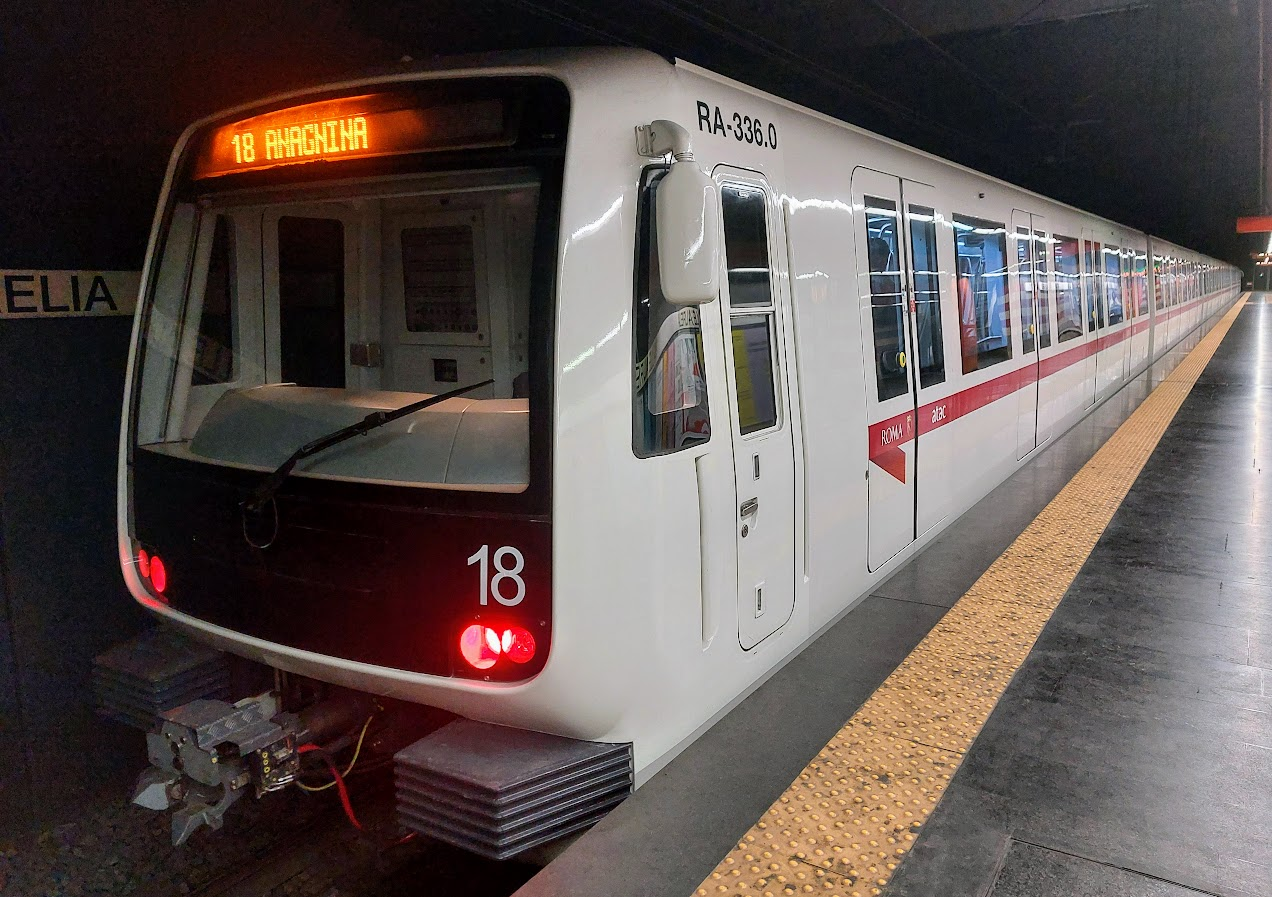
CAF MA300 train on line A

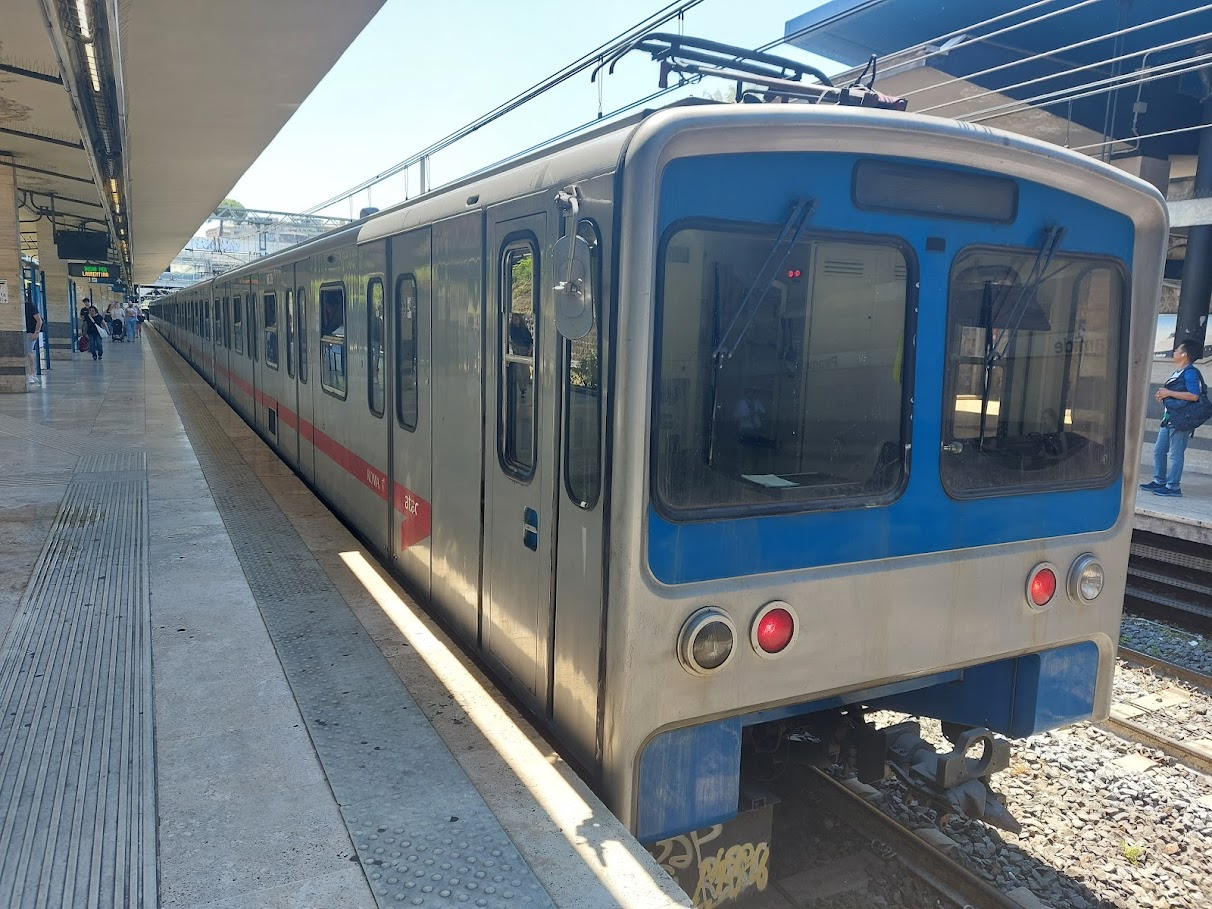
MB100 in service on line B at the Piramide station

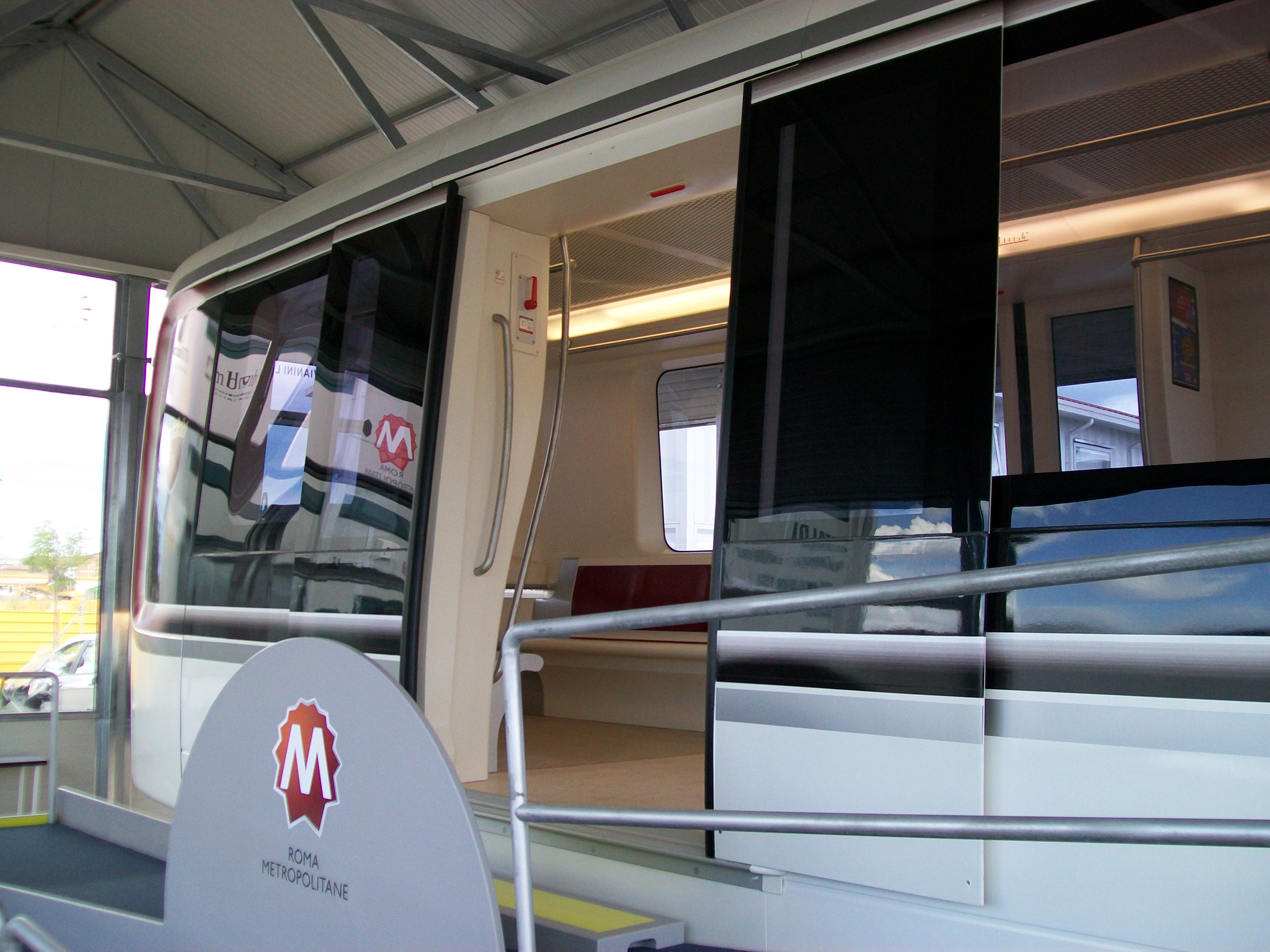
Detail of the trains used on line C, Hitachi Rail Italy Driverless Metro

All Rome metro lines are heavy rapid transit lines, with six-car trains, approximately 105 m long. Line A of the Rome metro uses exclusively the CAF MA 300 series, line B essentially uses the CAF MB400 series together with other CAF MA300 series trains and the historic MB 100 Ansaldobreda. Line C is the longest driverless metro in Italy and one of the largest in Europe, using Hitachi Rail Italy's driverless technology.

== Service ==
=== Fares ===
An urban single-journey ticket (integrated ticket), the Biglietto Integrato a Tempo (BIT), costs €1.50 and is valid on the Metro, suburban trains (FL lines), buses, and trams inside the Rome municipality for 100 minutes from first validation. Other tickets are available, including daily (€7.00), two-day (€12.50), and three-day (€18.00) passes (Rome 24h/48h/72h) as well as a weekly pass (€24.00), the Carta Integrata Settimanale (CIS). Monthly passes that are valid during the charged calendar month for unlimited journeys available for the personal usage (€35.00) or impersonal usage (€53.00) and may be used alternatively by different persons. Children under 10 years old travel can travel for free on public transport services when accompanied by a fare-paying adult.

Two proximity cards are available in Rome, ”èRoma” and ”Metrebus Card Red”, which can be charged with season tickets, replacing paper for this type of ticket.

=== Operating hours ===
Service starts at about 5:30 am and ends at about 11:30 pm. On Fridays and Saturdays, service ends later, at about 1:30 am.

When the Metro is closed, a night bus service operates with lines that follow the same routes and stop at the same stations as the Metro. Line A is served by bus NMA, Line B is served by bus NMB/NMB1, and Line C is served by bus NMC.

== Other rail lines ==
Metro and urban railways map (before opening of Jonio station and line C)

Rome's local transport provider, ATAC, operates the Metro network as well as the Rome-Giardinetti line. The Roma–Lido and Roma–Viterbo lines, the former of which connects Rome to Ostia, were operated by ATAC until they became part of the Cotral network on 1 July 2022.

=== Roma–Lido ===
Construction of the Roma–Lido line began shortly after the end of World War I and was completed some six years later in 1924. It began operation as a steam locomotion railway but electrification was completed less than a year later.

The line is operated as an integrated part of the Metro, but runs entirely overground. It runs from the Roma Porta San Paolo station beside the Line B Piramide station and runs alongside Line B as far as EUR Magliana. It then continues separately on to the seaside district of Ostia. The line terminates beside the end of Via Cristoforo Colombo.

=== Roma–Giardinetti ===
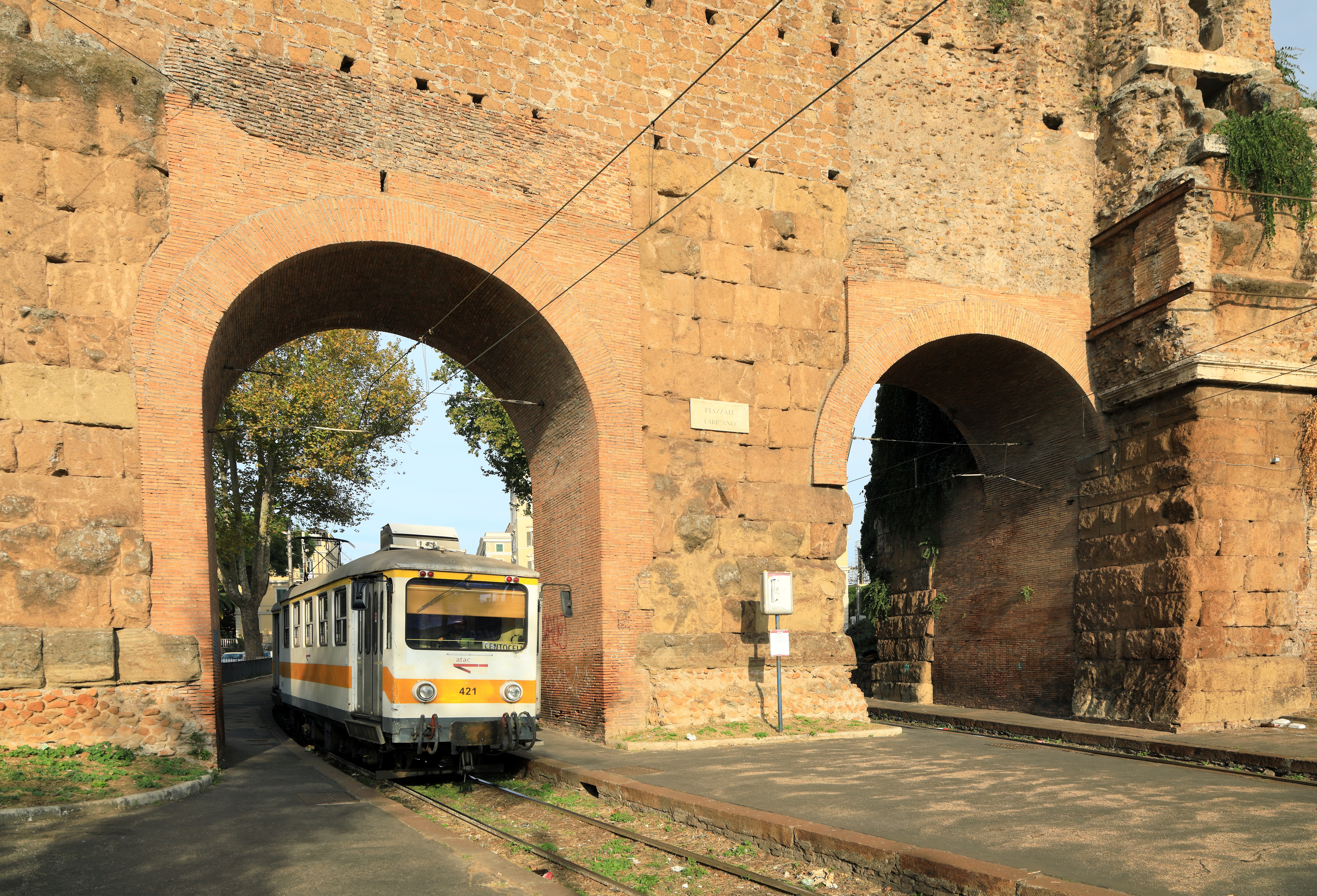
A train of the Roma–Giardinetti line

Officially termed a railway, the Roma–Giardinetti line is a narrow gauge tram which connects Laziali (a smaller, local train station some 800 metres east of Termini's main concourse) with Giardinetti, just past the Grande Raccordo Anulare (GRA) – Rome's orbital motorway. The line originally ran to Frosinone some 137 km (85 mi) from Rome, but has been gradually reduced in length, when the section from Giardinetti to Pantano, which will become a permanent part of Line C, was taken out of service. Most recently also the part from Centocelle to Giardinetti was reduced.

As regards future projects, the transformation of the line into a modern light rail line is planned, with an extension planned to the Tor Vergata area. The new light rail system will be called "line G" with respect to the metro network and line 11 with respect to the tram network. The work, after a long bureaucratic process, has been commissioned and financed; the line is expected to close during 2026 in order for work to begin.

=== Roma–Civita Castellana–Viterbo ===
The Roma–Civita Castellana–Viterbo line (also called Roma Nord railway) began life as a narrow-gauge tram running from Piazza della Libertà in Rome to Civita Castellana. However, the next stretch of the line, to Viterbo, was built as a railway and over the years the tram section was converted into a railway as well, a process which concluded with the moving of the Roman terminus from the street-level terminus at Piazza della Libertà across the river to a new underground station in Piazzale Flaminio, beside the subsequently constructed Line A station, after World War II.

The line is operated in two modes: as an urban service from Piazzale Flaminio to Montebello, and as a suburban service from Piazzale Flaminio to Viterbo. The urban service operates with a frequency of about one train every ten minutes, while the suburban service operates considerably less frequently, with less than a third of the trains making the full two-and-a-half–hour journey from Rome to Viterbo.

== Future expansions ==
The Metro system is currently expanding:

- An extension of line A from Battistini to Torrevecchia towards the west of the city is planned; a track of 2 kilometres (1.2 mi) with two stations.
- An extension of line B is also planned. A track of 2.8 kilometres (1.7 mi) with two stations should be realised from Rebibbia (Rome Metro) to Torraccia/Casal Monastero, towards the east of Rome. The extension of the line B1 is extending from Jonio to Bufalotta with 3.8 kilometers with three stations.
- The extension of line C towards the centre of Rome is under construction. From San Giovanni (interchange station with line A) to Grottarossa (Rome Metro), the track is 3.6 kilometres (2.2 mi) long with an intermediate station near San Giovanni Addolorata Hospital, Amba Aradam. As of 2026, the section from San Giovanni and Colosseo has been completed and is open to the public.

=== New lines ===
Proposed Line D

There are two proposed new lines, with no timeline for their construction:

- Line D is currently proposed to run from Ojetti in the north to Agricoltura in the south, passing through the city centre to the west of Roma Termini. Development on the project was suspended from 2012 to 2018.
- Line E would take over the existing Rome–Lido railway and the Jonio branch of Line B, with a new railway connection south of Roma Porta San Paolo/Piramide.
- Line F

Line	Terminals		Opening	Length	Stations
	Ojetti	Agricoltura	2037	22 km	22
	Cristoforo Colombo	Piramide		28.3 km	16
	Flaminio	Sacrofano		12.5 km	17

== Signalling ==
Signalling of the Rome Metro guarantees trains' safe and correct movements.

=== Line A ===
Line A uses an evolution of the RS4 Codici, a classical block system of the Italian railway. Since its creation the signalling offers to the conductor advice about the speed limit and the freedom of the way.

=== Line B ===
Until 1990, Line B used a railway-like signaling system that advised only about the freedom of the way.

Since 1990, the line uses a new signaling system, inspired by the Milan Metro's signaling, that gives information about the speed limit in the section within a range of 0 km/h and 80 km/h. Conductors are informed by classical light semaphores.

=== Line C ===
Line C is an automatic line and uses a radio frequency system for communication with the train. It has an electrical block system that permits a max frequency of a train every 90 seconds.

== See also ==
- List of Rome Metro stations
- Transport in Rome
- Transport in Italy
- Lazio regional railways
- 2006 Rome Metro crash
- List of metro systems
