= Conca d'Oro (Rome Metro) =

Rome metro station

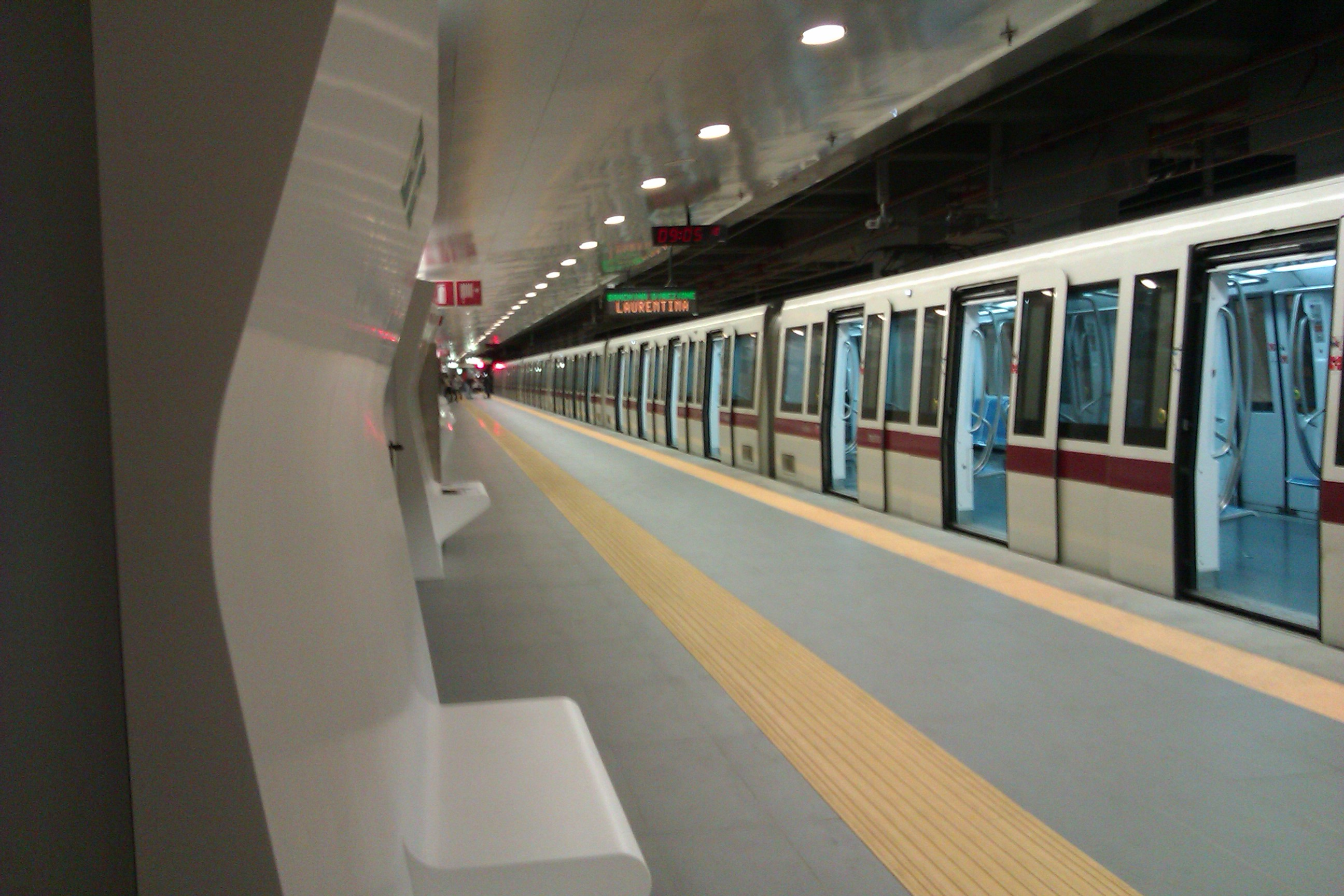

General information
- Location: Piazza Conca d'Oro, Rome; Italy
- Coordinates: 41°56′22″N 12°31′40″E
- Owner: ATAC

Construction
- Structure type: Underground

History
- Opened: 13 June 2012; 14 years ago

Services
Preceding station	Rome Metro	Following station
Libia towards Laurentina	Line B	Jonio Terminus
Location
- Click on the map to see marker

Conca d'Oro is an underground station on Line B of the Rome Metro. It is located in the Monte Sacro quarter, under the large Piazza Conca d'Oro.

The works, which cost €513 million, started in October 2005. The station opened on 13 June 2012 and served as the temporary terminus of the Line B1 until 2015, when Jonio was opened.
