= Jonio (Rome Metro) =

Rome metro station

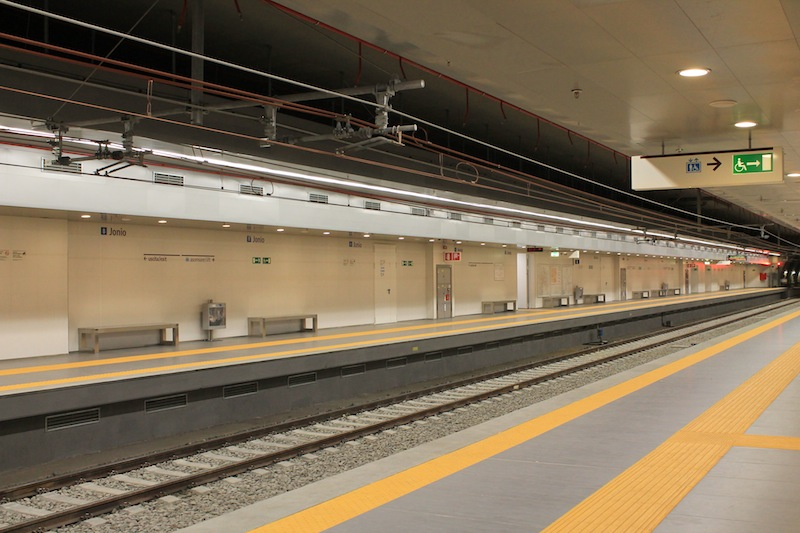

General information
- Location: Rome; Italy
- Coordinates: 41°56′47″N 12°31′41″E
- Owner: ATAC

Construction
- Structure type: Underground

History
- Opened: 21 April 2015; 11 years ago

Services
Preceding station	Rome Metro	Following station
Conca d'Oro towards Laurentina	Line B	Terminus
Location
- Click on the map to see marker

Jonio is an underground station on Line B of the Rome Metro. It is located in the Monte Sacro quarter, under the intersection between Viale Jonio and Via Scarpanto. The station was opened on 21 April 2015.

As with most rail heads, there are many bus connections; Junio Metro station has connections with buses 38, 63, 69, 80, 93, 338, 351, 435, and C5.

In 2021, a mural was built outside the station of two women kissing.

The station is in 10 minutes' walking distance from many cafes, restaurants, and shops.
