= LunEur =

Amusement park in Rome, Italy

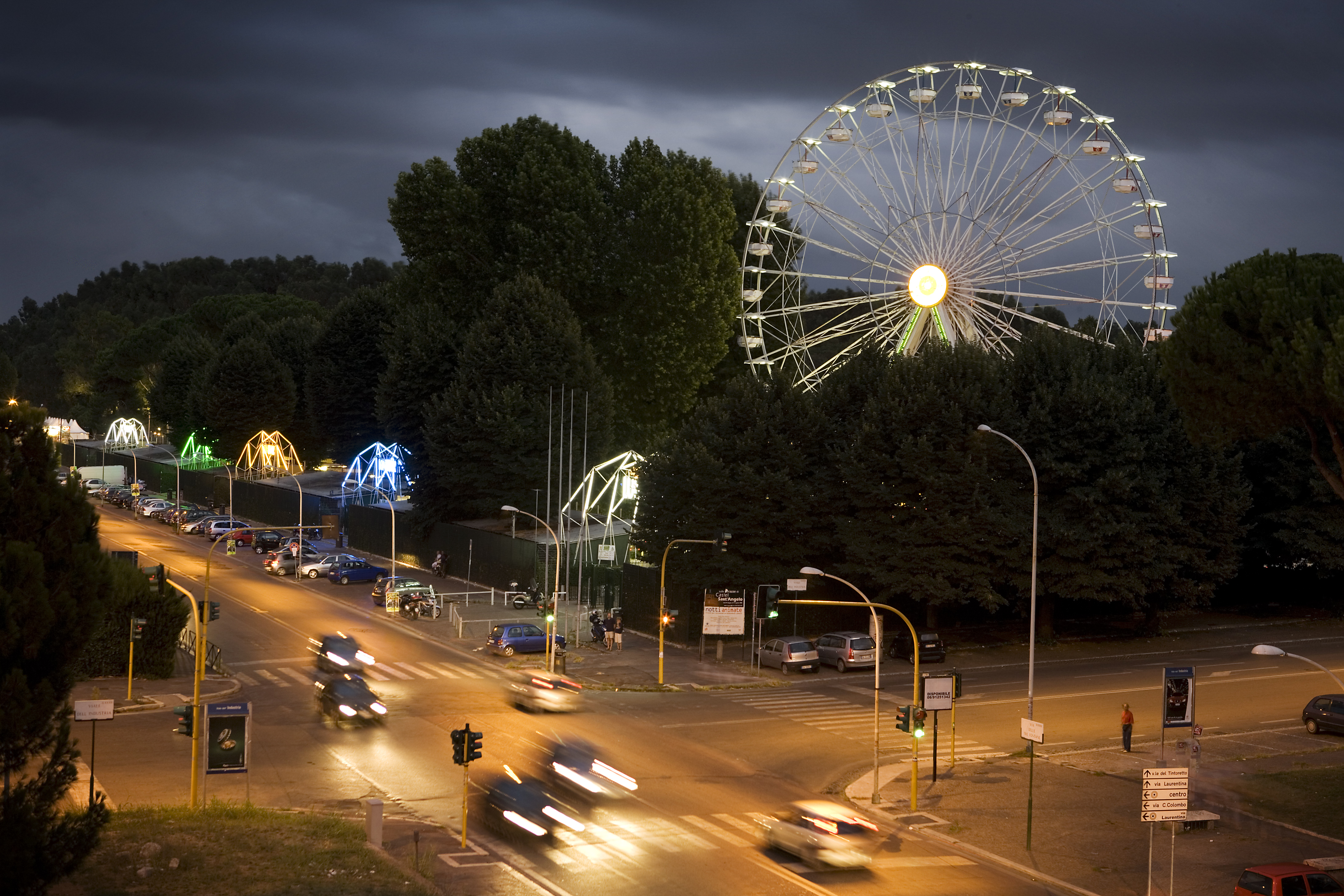
- The wheel of LunEur in 2006
- Interactive map of LunEur
- Location: Rome, Italy
- Coordinates: 41°50′11″N 12°28′35″E
- Status: Operating
- Opened: 1953, Reopened 2016
- Closed: 2008
- Area: 68,000 m^{2} (17 acres)

Attractions
- Roller coasters: 2 (1 under construction)
- Website: www.luneurpark.it

LunEur (complete name Luna Park Permanente di Roma) is an amusement park in Rome and the oldest (still operating) in Italy, dating back to 1953. It took its name from the Eur district in Rome where it is located. The park closed in 2008, a decision made by the prefetto in order to guarantee the safety of the area but it reopened in 2016. It closed during the COVID-19 pandemic.

LunEur is the second Luna Park for the city, succeeding the Frederick Ingersoll-built park that closed in the 1930s.

== History ==
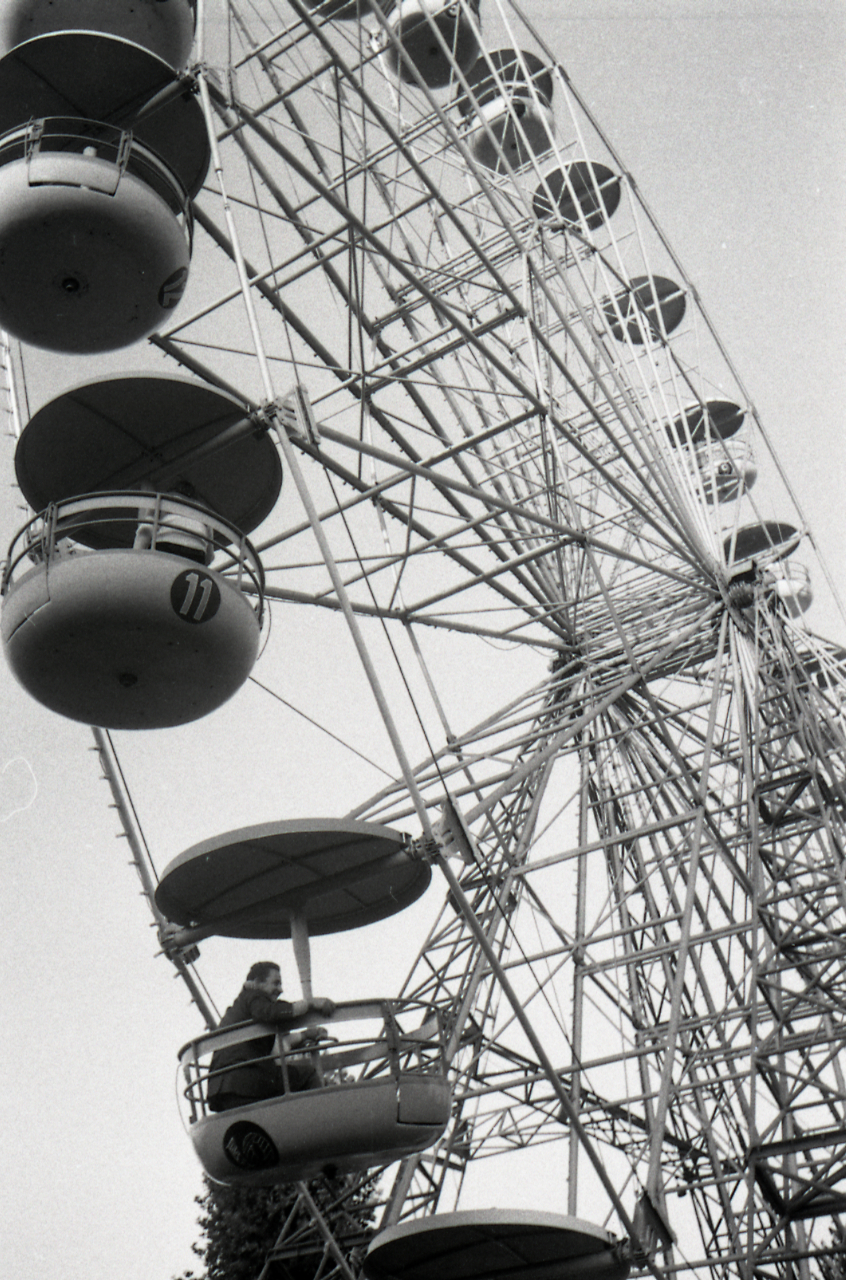
LunEur in 1967. Photo par Paolo Monti.

Initially, the rides were set up for the Agricultural Fair of 1953. Due to its unexpected popularity, however, a decision was made to keep the park open for a period of time every year. In 1960, the 17th Olympic Games were held in Rome, which prompted the decision to extend the park's season so it was open year-round. Five years later, a referendum was held, which led to the amusement park receiving its current name. LunEur stayed open year-round from 1960 to 1965.

Although the park maintained its popularity in the years immediately after the Olympics, it went through lean times in the early to mid 2000s.

In April 2008, one year after the renovations, the entire area was closed off.

On October 10, 2008, Mauro Miccio, managing director of Eur spa, which owns the grounds the park is located on, announced that this park might reopen at the beginning of 2009. But nothing came of this.

8 years after its closure, LunEur opened again on October 27, 2016. Most of the original rides were dismantled and substituted with new attractions.

== Rides ==
Space Container, Jungle River, Pasaje del Terror, Tappeto Elastico, American Circus, Labirinto di Cristallo, Dinosauri, Ruota Panoramica, Gincana, Palla Matta, Seggiolini volanti, Venturer, Nave Pirata, Kosmodromo, Giostre, Rettilario, Nessie, Lideur Boats, Trenino el Paso, Super Truck, Rotoshake, Magica casa, Las Vegas, Crazy Dance, Simulation Theatre, Casa Svizzera, Gonfiabili, Tokaido, Jumbo, Horror House, Tagadà, Tea Cup, Flipper, Miniscooter, and Splash Bowl.

=== Roller Coasters ===
All of LunEur's roller coasters have been steel-framed, sit-down roller coasters.

Ride	Manufacturer	Dates in use	Description
Himalaya	Pinfari	?1968-2001	The oldest and largest coaster on the park. This rickety metal coaster rises at least fifty meters above the LunEur. The cars are two seater mini cars, as opposed to the traditional train-style multiple seater roller coasters of today.
Thriller	Pinfari	?-2001	A roller coaster that could hold up to 960 rider per hour. The max height was 54.2 ft and ran for 1:15 minutes. The Looping Star was placed where this roller coaster previously stood.
Looping Star	Schwarzkopf	2002–2007	A roller coaster that could hold up to 1,700 riders per hour. The max height was 80.4 ft, with one inversion, and the max speed was 47.9 mph. This roller coaster was leased to Luneur by Bembon Rides and in 2007 was purchased by William Bird (Sales) Ltd. of Ireland who intends on touring Ireland with it. Currently operates under the name Shockwave in Ireland.
Bruco Mela	Pinfari	April 2008	This is a traditional "kiddie" roller coaster, for children about five years and older. The cars consist of sections of a caterpillar, with the first car being the head, and the last car being the tail. The track consists of various ups and downs with a section entering a giant apple. Hence the name Bruco Mela, or Caterpillar Apple.
Nessie		April 2008	The Nessie coaster is built over the central pond of the Luna Park. The cars consist of sections of a sea serpent, complete with multiple flippers with the first car being the head of the serpent, and the last car being the tail. The coaster dips and rises often skimming the water below. Several animatronic creatures jump out or spray water on the passengers.
Tokaido	Pinfari	?-April 2008	powered roller coaster in the shape of a figure eight. A single train with 7 cars. Riders are arranged 2 across in 2 rows for a total of 28 riders. The max height was 23 ft and the max speed was 24.9 mph.
Treno Delle Miniere	Pinfari	April 2008	A traditional mine cart ride. Three cars per train. Riders are arranged 2 across in 2 rows for a total of 12 riders per train.

== Access ==
The nearest metro stations are EUR Magliana, EUR Palasport and EUR Fermi of Line B. Busses 767, 706, 707, 717, 765 and 771 also go the park.
