= Basilica San Paolo (Rome Metro) =

Rome metro station

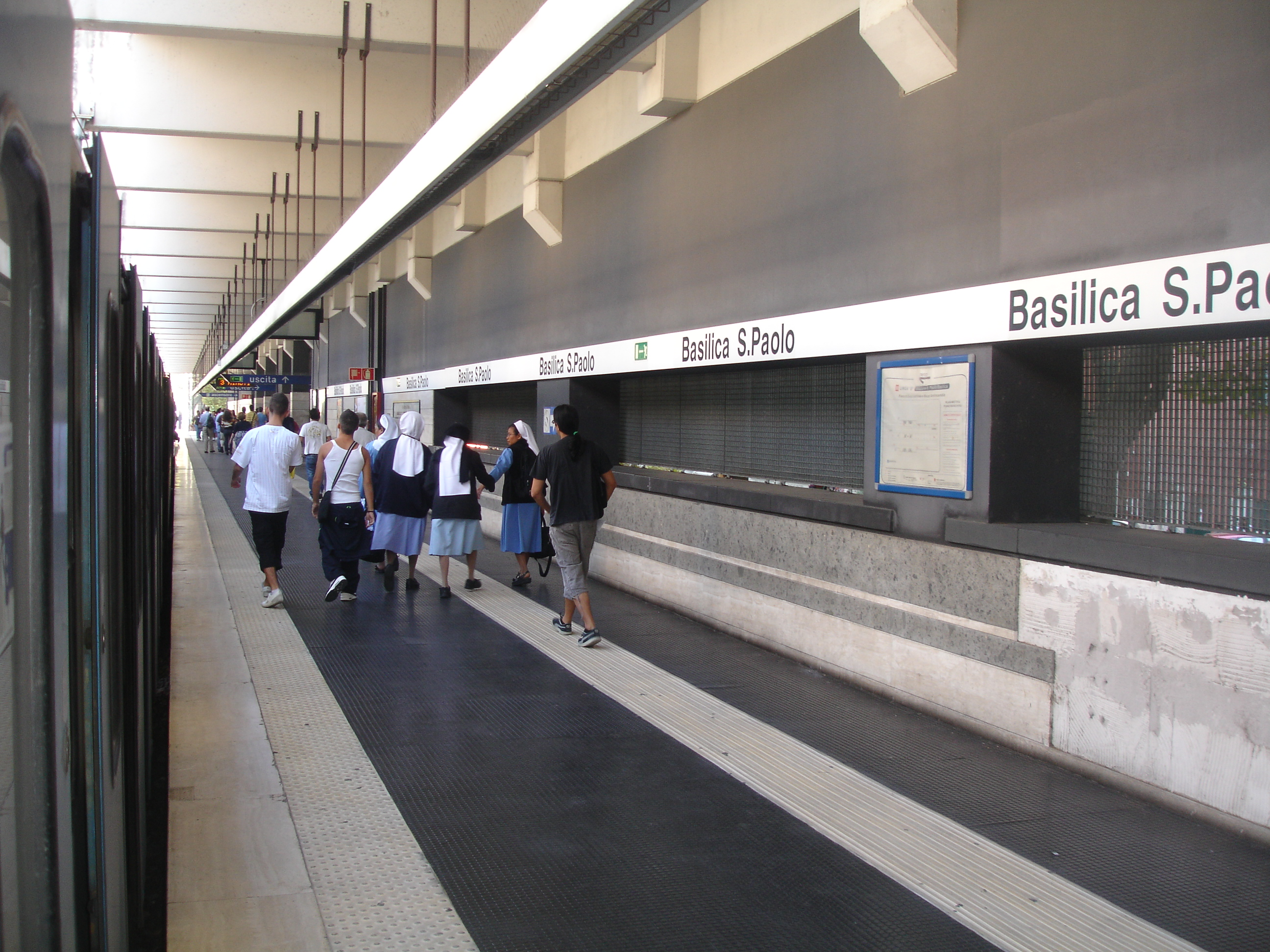
- Nuns and laypeople walking in the Station

General information
- Coordinates: 41°51′22″N 12°28′41.5″E
- Owner: ATAC

Construction
- Structure type: Aboveground

History
- Opened: 1955; 71 years ago

Services
Preceding station	Cotral	Following station
EUR Magliana towards Cristoforo Colombo	Metromare	Porta San Paolo Terminus
Preceding station	Rome Metro	Following station
Marconi towards Laurentina	Line B	Garbatella towards Rebibbia or Jonio
Location
- Click on the map to see marker

Basilica San Paolo is a station on the Line B of the Rome Metro. It was opened in 1955 and is located at the intersection between Viale Giustiniano Imperatore and Via Gaspare Gozzi, behind the Basilica of Saint Paul Outside the Walls (after which it is named) in the Ostiense quarter. It is also one of three Metro stations also served by the Rome-Lido railway line.

Before reaching the station the line, in the Porta San Paolo direction, runs through a 230m gorge excavated in the 1920s from the "Roccia di San Paolo" to avoid interfering with the landscape, rather than the original plan which ran the line around the "roccia" but ran it right alongside the basilica.

The Station was shut down for three days in early 2026 for maintenance.

== Surroundings ==
The station is within 5 minutes' walking distance from many cafes, restaurants, and shops.

Several notable sites near the station include:

- Basilica of Saint Paul Without the Walls
- Parco Ildefonso Schuster
- Garbatella
- Tiber River
- University of Rome III
- Ponte Marconi

== Gallery ==
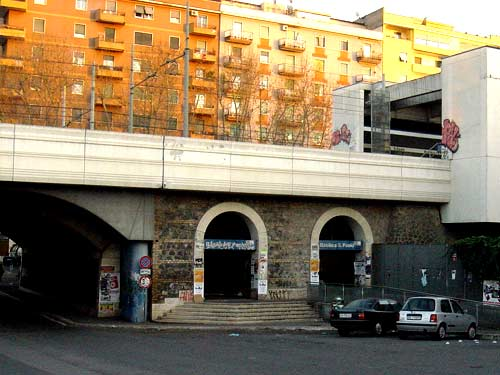
One of the entrances

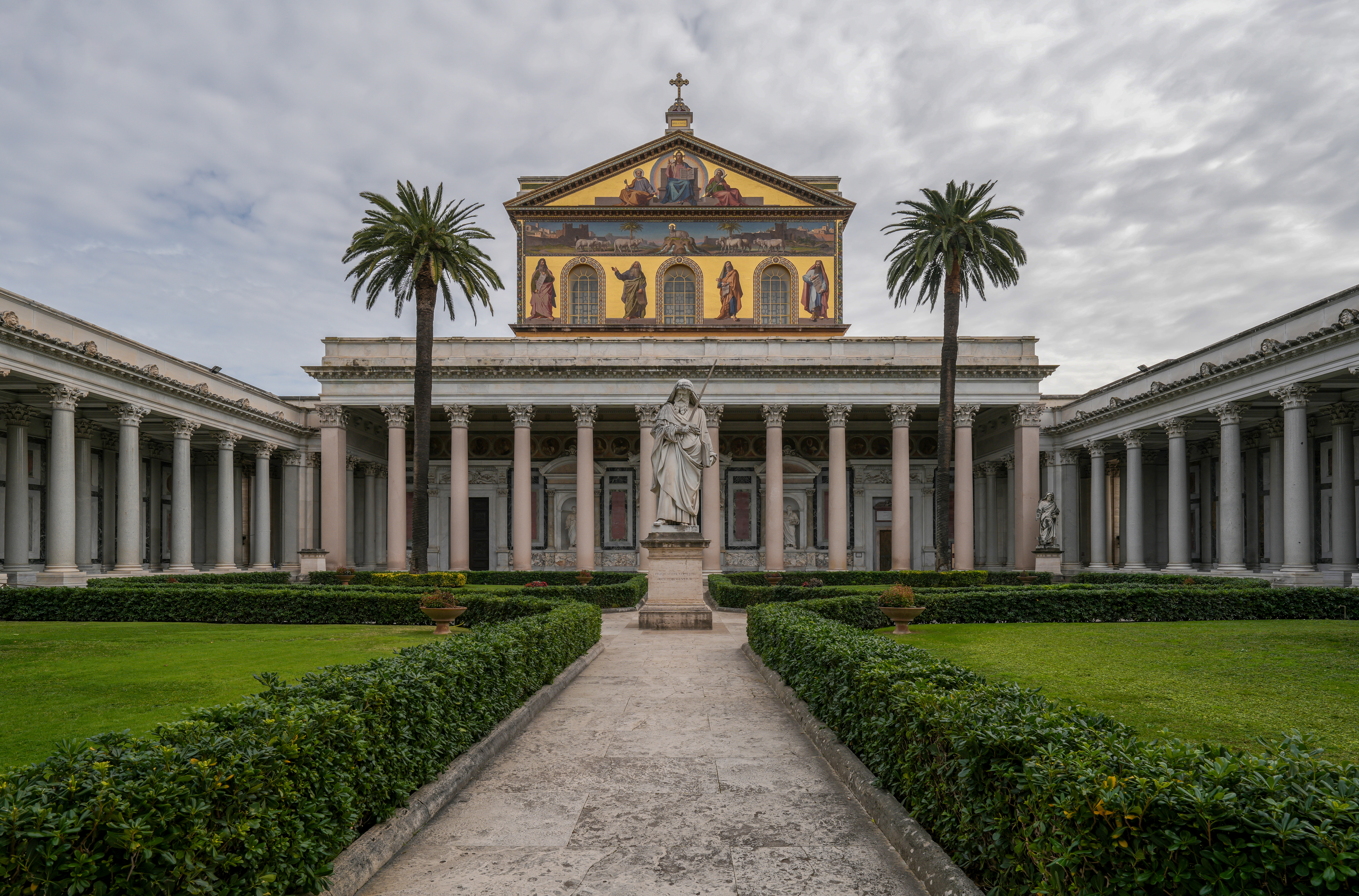
Basilica San Paolo
