= Santa Maria del Soccorso (Rome Metro) =

Rome metro station

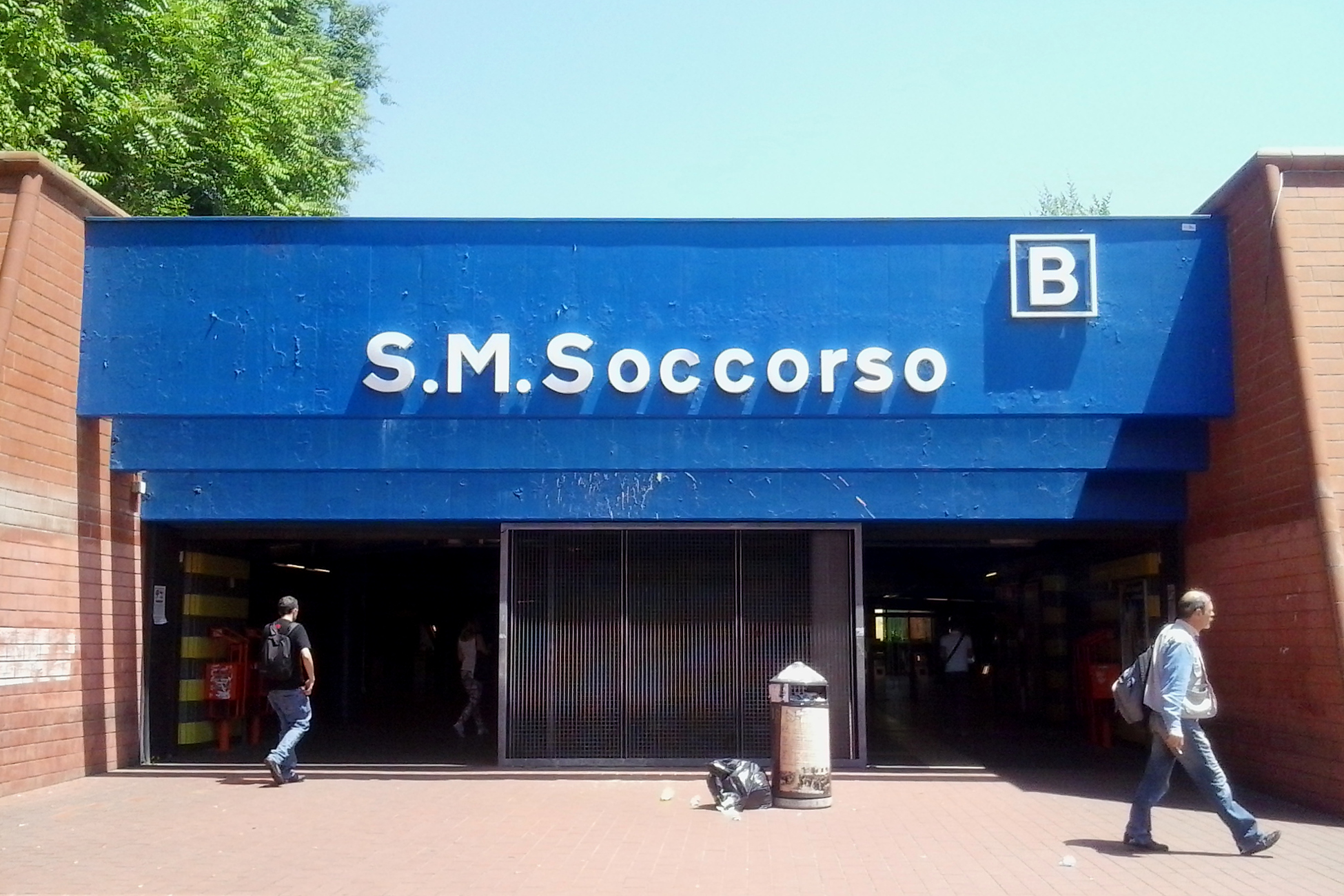

General information
- Coordinates: 41°54′56″N 12°33′39″E
- Owner: ATAC

Construction
- Structure type: Underground

History
- Opened: 8 December 1990; 35 years ago

Services
Preceding station	Rome Metro	Following station
Pietralata towards Laurentina	Line B	Ponte Mammolo towards Rebibbia
Location
- Click on the map to see marker

Santa Maria del Soccorso is a surface station of Line B on the Rome Metro, named after the nearby church of Santa Maria del Soccorso. It is located on Via Tiburtina, at the junction with Piazza Santa Maria del Soccorso, Via del Frantoio and Via del Badile. It was opened on 8 December 1990.

There is street art by Gomez in the Station.

The station is in 5 minutes' walking distance from many cafes, restaurants, and shops. It connects directly with bus 450, and other bus services are nearby.
