= Quintiliani =

Rome metro station

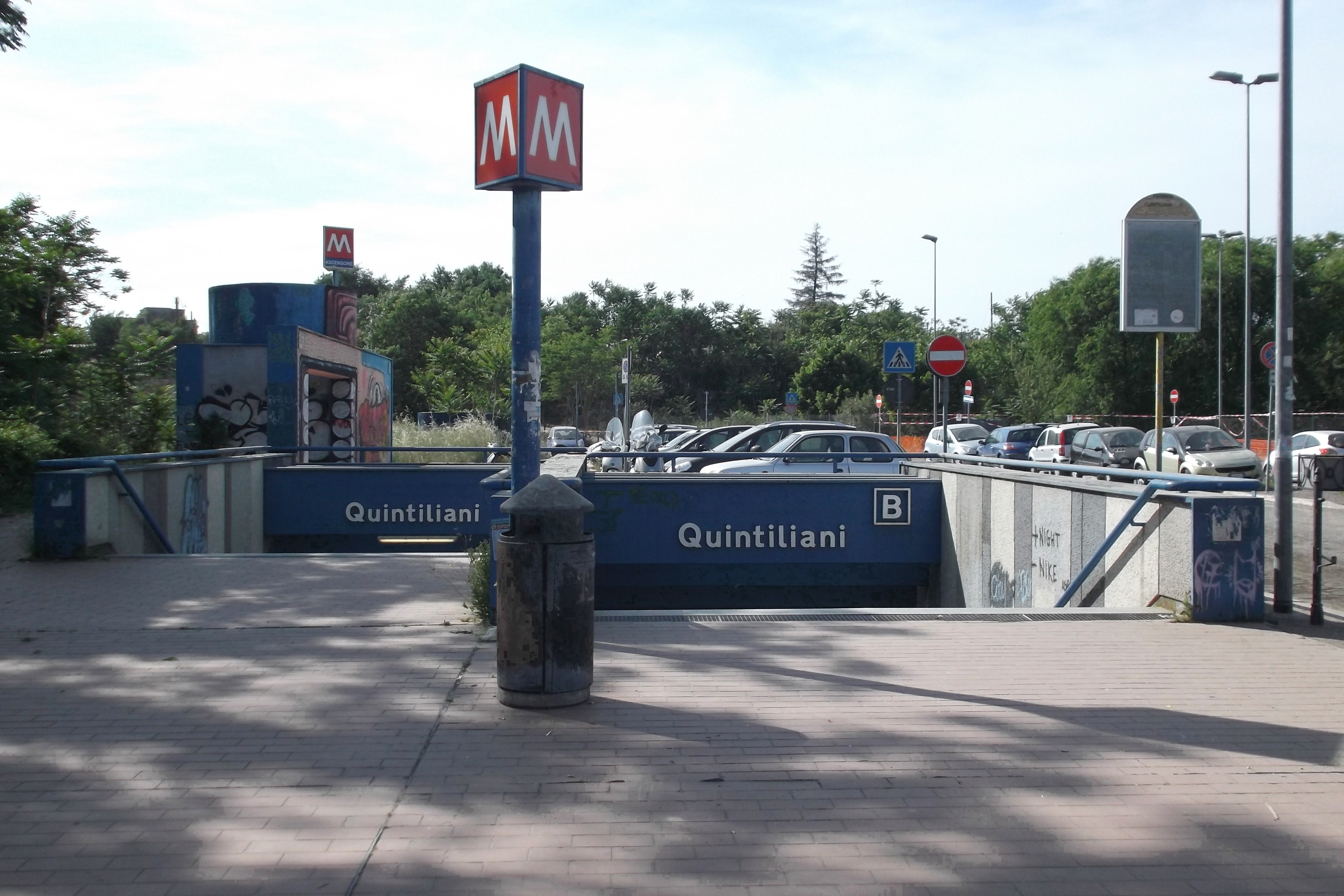
- Entrance of the station

General information
- Coordinates: 41°54′56″N 12°32′19″E
- Owner: ATAC

Construction
- Structure type: Underground

History
- Opened: 23 June 2003; 23 years ago

Services
Preceding station	Rome Metro	Following station
Tiburtina towards Laurentina	Line B	Monti Tiburtini towards Rebibbia
Location
- Click on the map to see marker

Quintiliani [kwin.ti.ˈlja.ni] is a station on Line B of the Rome Metro. It is located on Via della Pietra Sanguigna and takes its name from the ancient Casale dei Quintiliani, which stood near the station. Other nearby streets are Via delle Cave di Pietralata and Via del Casale Quintiliani. Nearby is the Ospedale Sandro Pertini.

== History ==
Prior to opening, the station was going to be called Pietralata (with the present Pietralata station to be called Feronia), but it was decided that this could cause confusion and in 1990 it was decided to change the station's name to its present one. It now stands in open countryside but was planned to serve the new Sistema Direzionale Orientale (SDO; Eastern Directional District), which was to be sited in precisely the same area, with an interchange onto a planned 'line D' from Monte Sacro, as yet still unbuilt. Line B opened in 1990, but trains did not stop at Quintiliani until 23 June 2003, when the SDO project was dismissed and the station was opened to regular service.
