= Garbatella (Rome Metro) =

Rome metro station

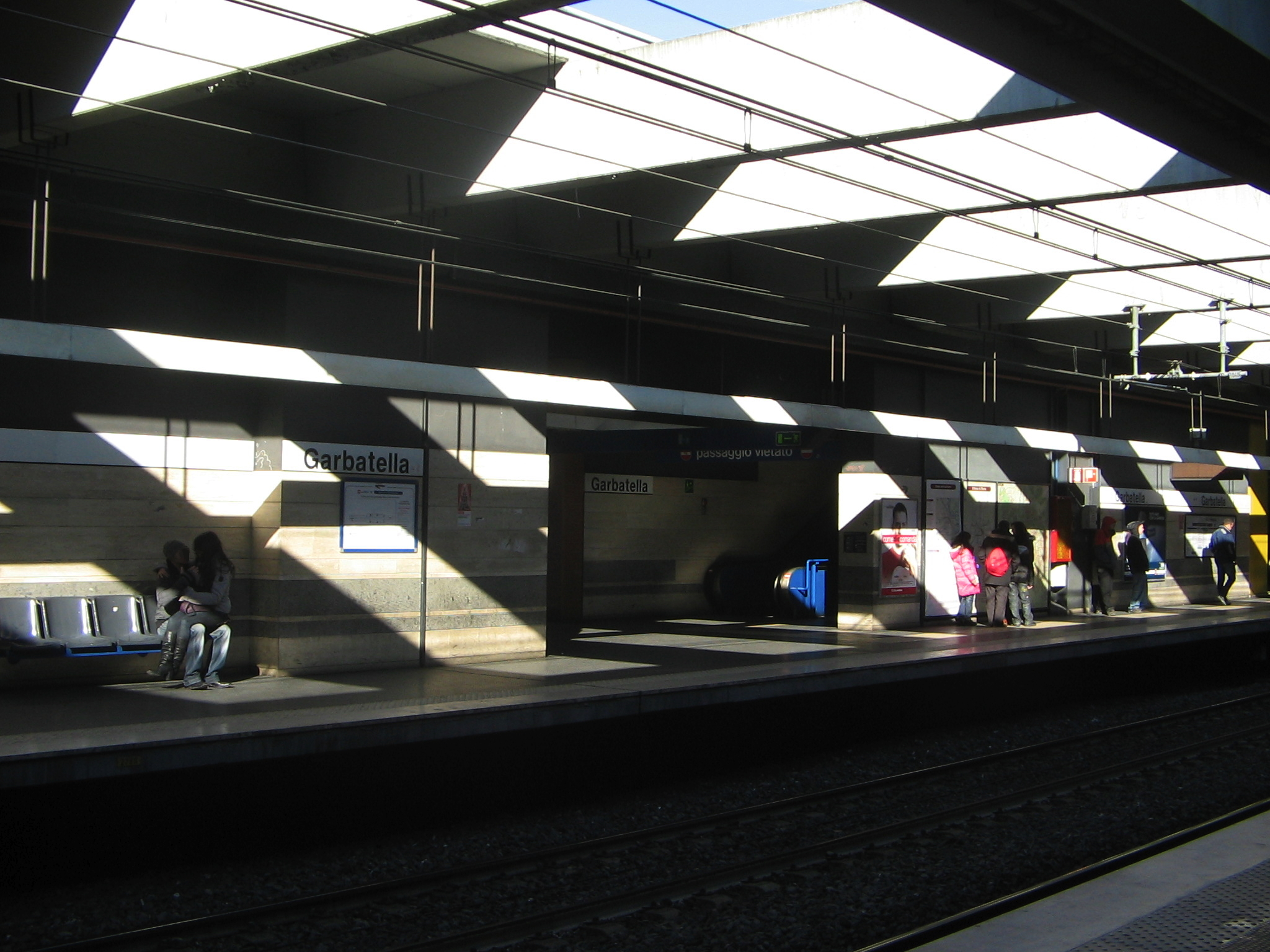

General information
- Coordinates: 41°52′00″N 12°29′00″E
- Owner: ATAC

Construction
- Structure type: Aboveground

History
- Opened: 1990; 36 years ago

Services
Preceding station	Rome Metro	Following station
Basilica San Paolo towards Laurentina	Line B	Piramide towards Rebibbia or Jonio
Location
- Click on the map to see marker

Garbatella is a station on the Line B of the Rome Metro. It was opened in 1990 and is located behind the former Mercati Generali di Roma, on the via Ostiense in the Ostiense quarter. It replaces the old Garbatella station 200m away, whose entrance was on Piazza Giancarlo Vallauri (the present one is accessed from Via Giacinto Pullino).

== Surroundings ==
- Garbatella
- Former Mercati Generali
- University of Rome III
- Teatro Palladium
