= Monti Tiburtini (Rome Metro) =

Rome metro station

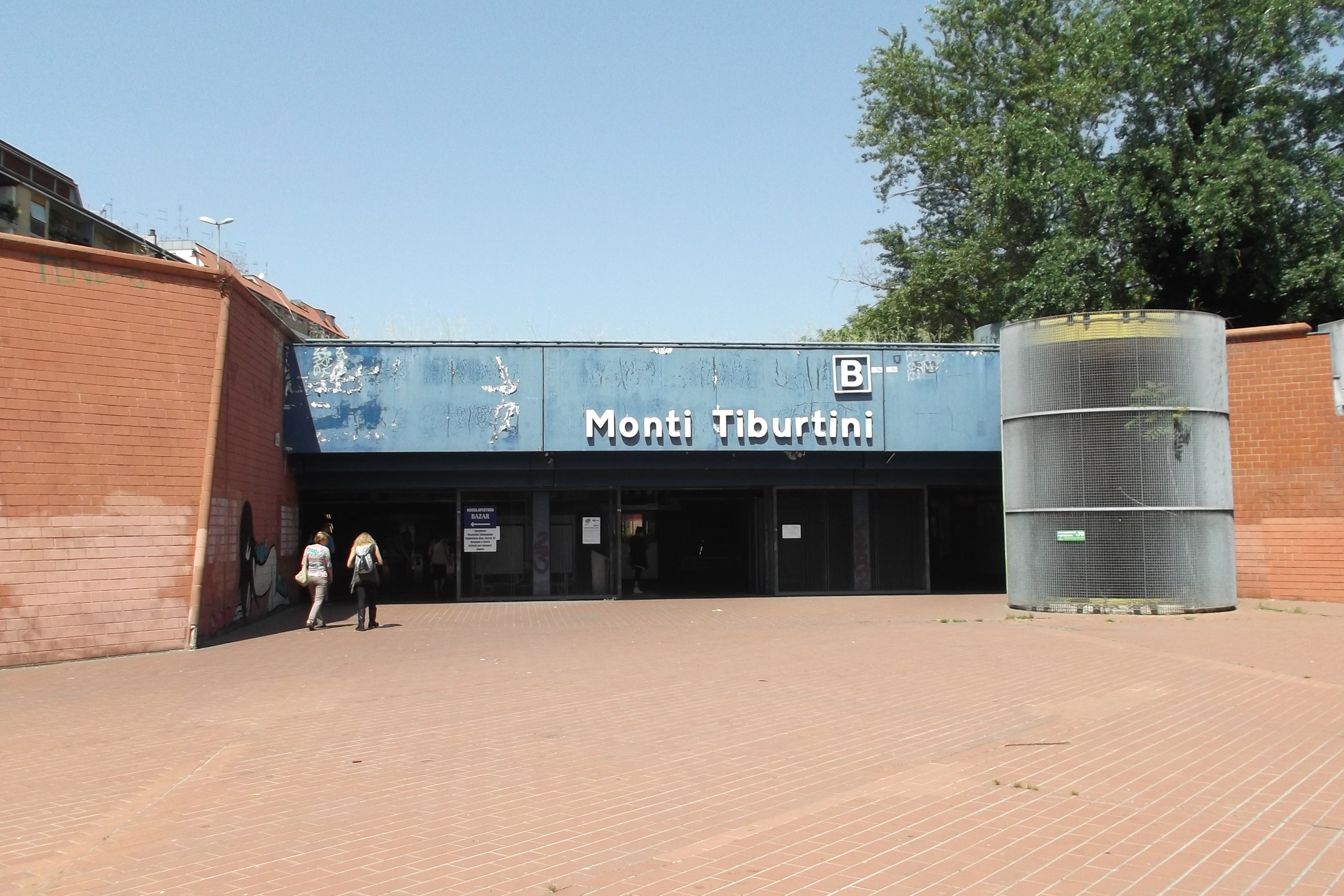

General information
- Coordinates: 41°54′57″N 12°32′52″E
- Owner: ATAC
- Connections: Tiburtina railway station

Construction
- Structure type: Underground

History
- Opened: 8 December 1990; 35 years ago

Services
Preceding station	Rome Metro	Following station
Quintiliani towards Laurentina	Line B	Pietralata towards Rebibbia
Location
- Click on the map to see marker

Monti Tiburtini is a station on Line B of the Rome Metro. It is located on Via dei Monti Tiburtini, at the junction with Via Filippo Meda. To make room for its construction, in the early 1980s, some tennis courts and a football field of a nearby sports centre were demolished. It opened on 8 December 1990. Nearby are the Ospedale Sandro Pertini and bus stops for services 61, 449, 542, 544, 548 and n2.
