= Pietralata (Rome Metro) =

Rome metro station

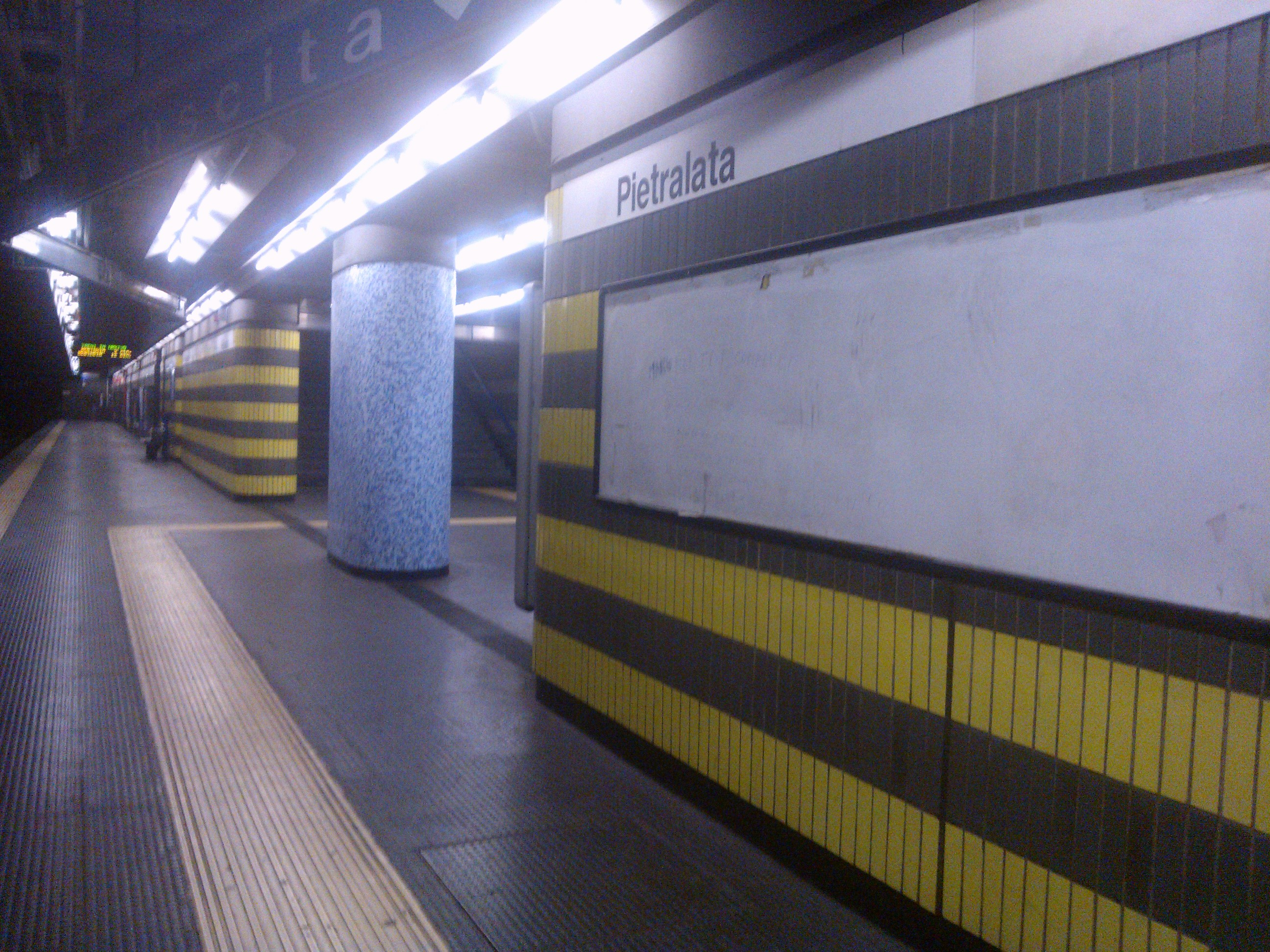

General information
- Coordinates: 41°54′53″N 12°33′18″E
- Owner: ATAC

Construction
- Structure type: Underground

History
- Opened: 8 December 1990; 35 years ago

Services
Preceding station	Rome Metro	Following station
Monti Tiburtini towards Laurentina	Line B	Santa Maria del Soccorso towards Rebibbia
Location
- Click on the map to see marker

Pietralata is a station on Line B of the Rome Metro. It is located on Via di Pietralata, after which it is named, in the Pietralata quarter, the 21st quarter of Rome, near the Forte Tiburtino and the Autostrada A24.

It opened on 8 December 1990. It was originally to have been known as Feronia, after the street of that name not far from where the station was to be sited, while the name of Pietralata was supposed to be assigned to the Quintiliani station. Just a few months before the station opened to the public, it was decided to give it the present name.
