= Marconi (Rome Metro) =

Rome metro station

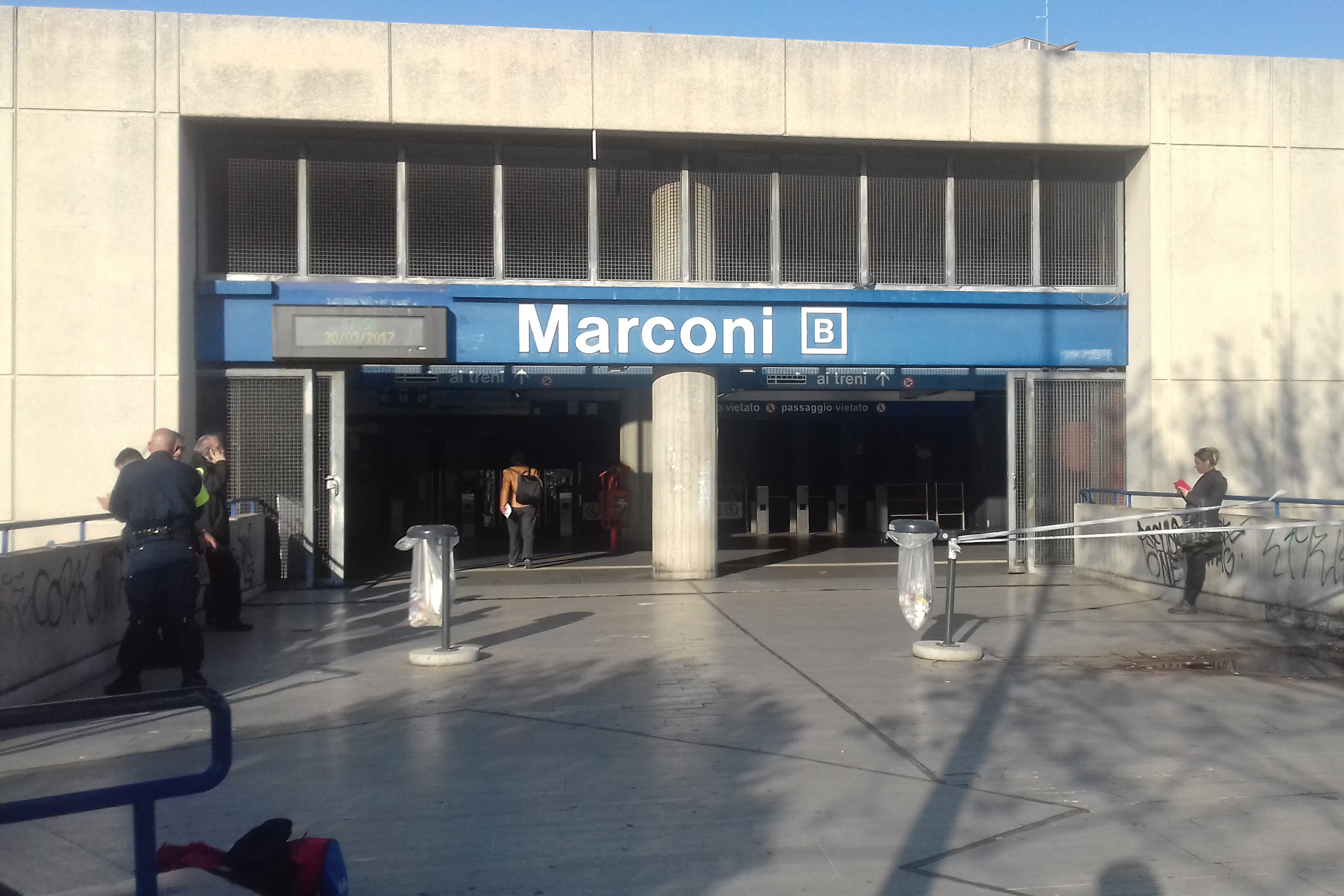

General information
- Coordinates: 41°50′58″N 12°28′32″E
- Owner: ATAC

Construction
- Structure type: Aboveground

History
- Opened: 1993; 33 years ago

Services
Preceding station	Rome Metro	Following station
EUR Magliana towards Laurentina	Line B	Basilica San Paolo towards Rebibbia or Jonio
Location
- Click on the map to see marker

Marconi is a station on line B of the Rome Metro. It is located at the point where the via Ostiense passes under the viale Guglielmo Marconi, after which it is named. Its exits are located on viale Marconi and via Ostiense.

Before it opened, there was a "EUR Marconi" station, now renamed "EUR Palasport".

== Nearby amenities ==
The station is in walking distance from many cafes, restaurants, hotels, hostels, and shops, especially along via Ostiense and viale Guglielmo Marconi, as well as the church of Basilica of Saint Paul Outside the Walls.

There are bus connections to buses 170, 670, and 791.

A new mural on the outside of the station was unveiled in 2023, showing bicyclists, the Colosseum, and other Roman scenes.

Other surrounding sites include the Università Roma Tre, the former cinodromo di Ponte Marconi, and Ponte Marconi, from which runs a motorboat along the Tiber to Ostia Antica.
