= EUR Magliana =

Railway station in Rome

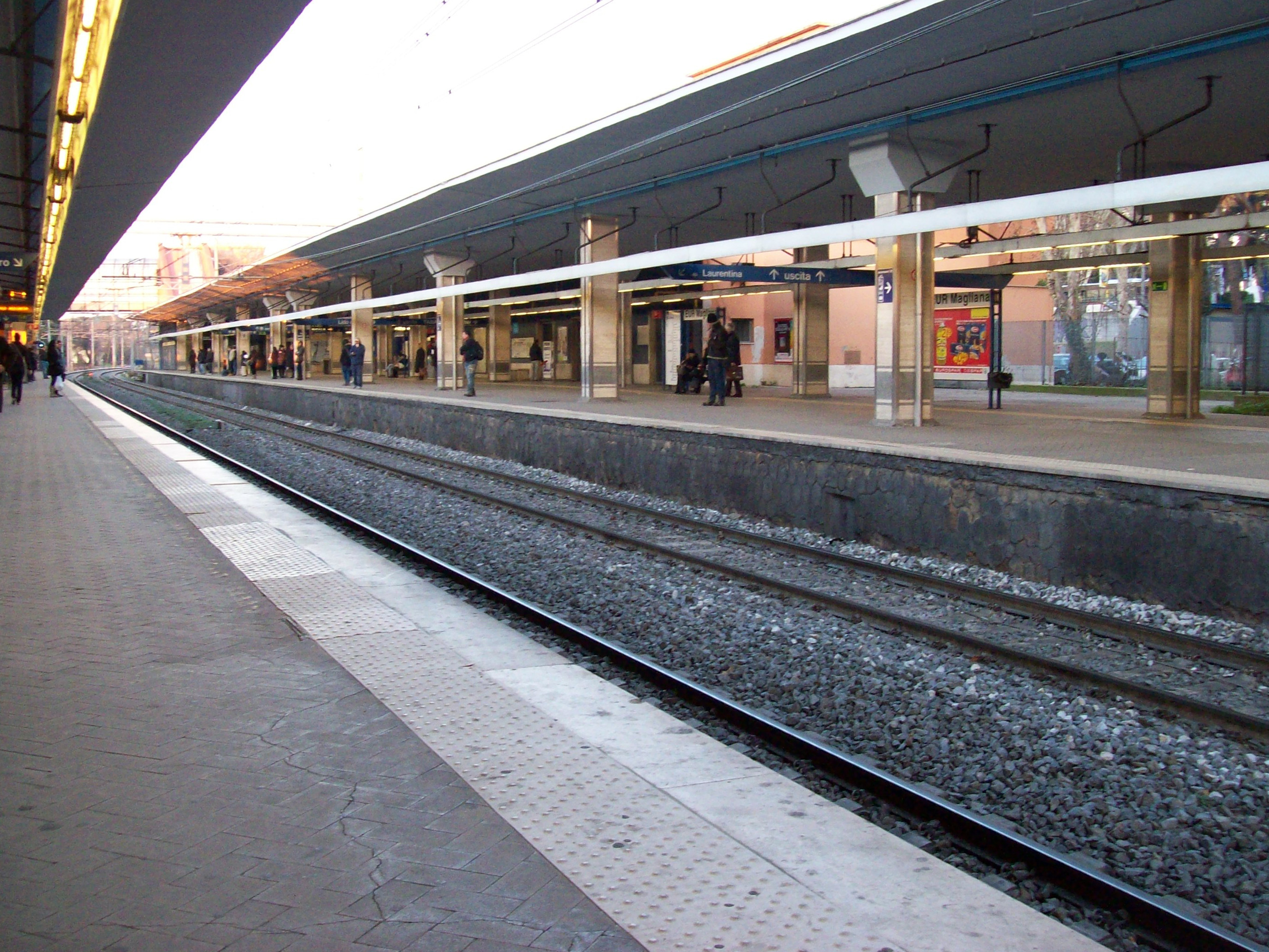

General information
- Location: EUR, Rome
- Coordinates: 41°50′22″N 12°27′48″E
- Owner: ATAC

Construction
- Structure type: Aboveground

History
- Opened: 10 August 1924; 102 years ago

Services
Preceding station	Cotral	Following station
Tor di Valle towards Cristoforo Colombo	Metromare	Basilica San Paolo towards Porta San Paolo
Preceding station	Rome Metro	Following station
EUR Palasport towards Laurentina	Line B	Marconi towards Rebibbia or Jonio
Location
- Click on the map to see marker

EUR Magliana is a railway station in Rome served by the Metro line B and the Ferrovia Roma-Lido in the EUR or Europa district of Rome. It was opened in 1924 as a Roma-Lido station for the Esposizione Universale Roma as Magliana (after the Magliana district, akin to the other stations opened at that time Torrino, Risaro, Acilia, Ostia Scavi and Marina di Ostia). It was later renamed Magliana Ostiense, then Magliana again and finally its present name.

The building has been repeatedly rebuilt. Its atrium is decorated by mosaics that have won the Artemetro Roma prize by Antonio Passa (Italy) and Tamás Lossonczy (Hungary). Next to it is a railway depot for both lines.

== Surroundings ==
- "Tre Fontane" sports complex of the Italian National Olympic Committee (CONI)
- Abbazia delle Tre fontane
- Palazzo della Civiltà Italiana (Palazzo della Civiltà del Lavoro o Colosseo Quadrato) by Giovanni Guerrini, Ernesto Lapadula and Mario Romano
- Palazzo dei Congressi
- Basilica parrocchiale dei Santi Pietro e Paolo
- Museo della Civiltà Romana
- Obelisco Marconi
