= Ponte Mammolo (Rome Metro) =

Rome metro station

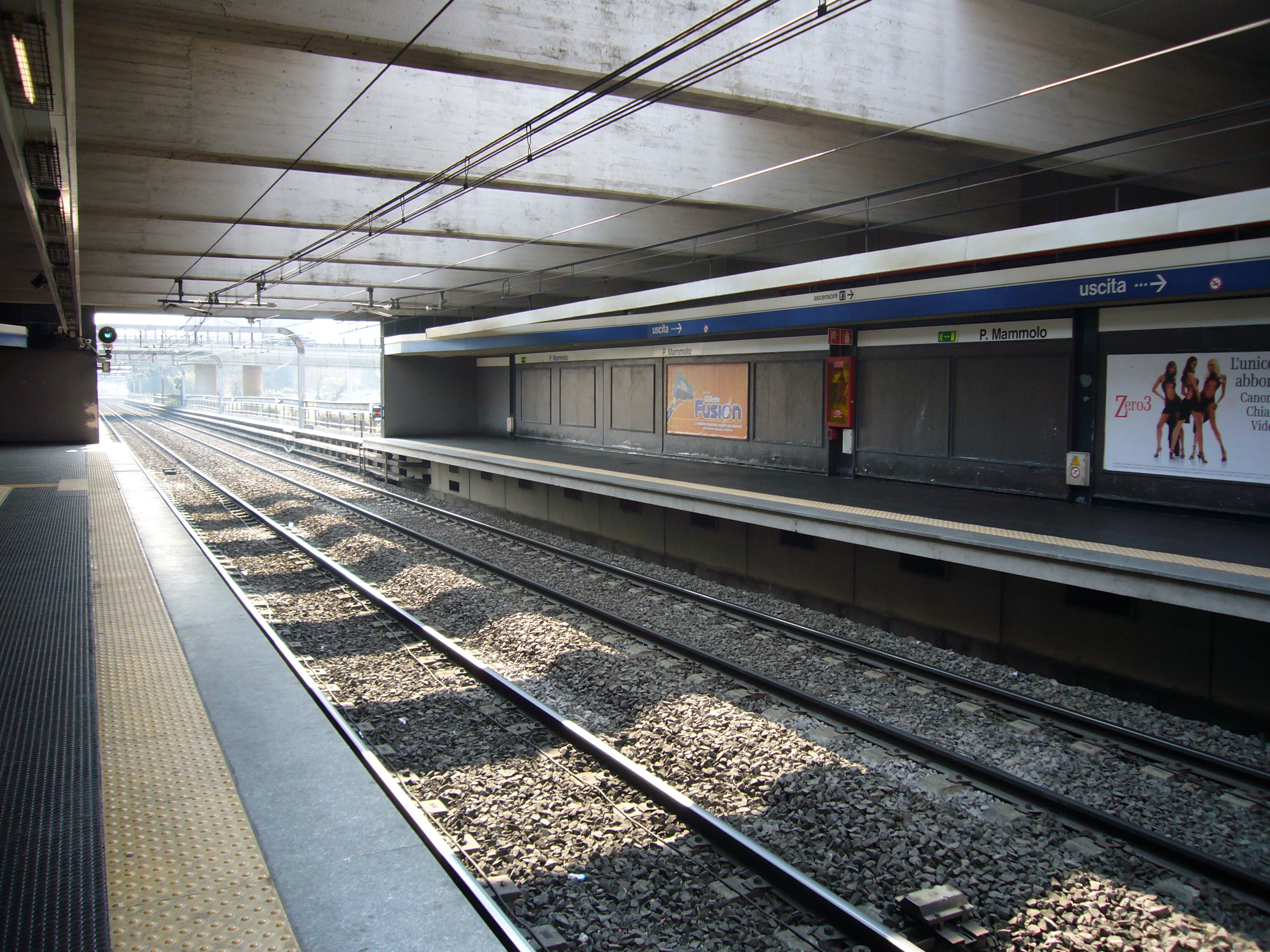

General information
- Coordinates: 41°55′14″N 12°33′54″E
- Owner: ATAC

Construction
- Structure type: Elevated

History
- Opened: September 1997; 29 years ago

Services
Preceding station	Rome Metro	Following station
Santa Maria del Soccorso towards Laurentina	Line B	Rebibbia Terminus
Location
- Click on the map to see marker

Ponte Mammolo is an above ground station on line B of the Rome Metro in the Ponte Mammolo district of Rome. It is on the road which links Viale Palmiro Togliatti to Via Tiburtina, and nearby is the river Aniene.

The line itself opened in 1990 and for a long time line B services did not stop at the incomplete station, until the station finally opened in September 1997. At the same time a major terminus for urban and suburban buses (most of which had previously run to and from Rebibbia station) opened here.

COTRAL regional blue buses stop at the bus terminal just outside the main entrance of the station, connecting Rome to some important archeological sites such as Hadrian's Villa, Villa d'Este and the town of Tivoli.

== 'The Community of Peace' refugee camp ==
The land adjacent to the station used to house a refugee camp of between 150 and 300 refugees, mostly hailing from South America, Romania and more recently from Syria and Eritrea. The refugee camp became known as 'The Community of Peace.' Its accommodation was a mixture of tents, shacks built from sheet metal and a few brick sheds. The only sanitation was a water fountain and an outside toilet shared by the whole community. It was described in the local Italian press as the 'least known' of the refugee camps in the city.

In February 2015 Pope Francis made an unscheduled visit to the camp where he was warmly welcomed by the residents. He spoke with the refugees and prayed with them.

In May 2015, the local authorities bulldozed the camp without warning, destroying the temporary houses while most residents were at work. It was reported by The New York Times that refugees lost all their possessions, including money, clothes, furniture, white goods and mementoes. The residents were successfully rehoused in other accommodation around Rome
