= EUR Palasport =

Rome metro station

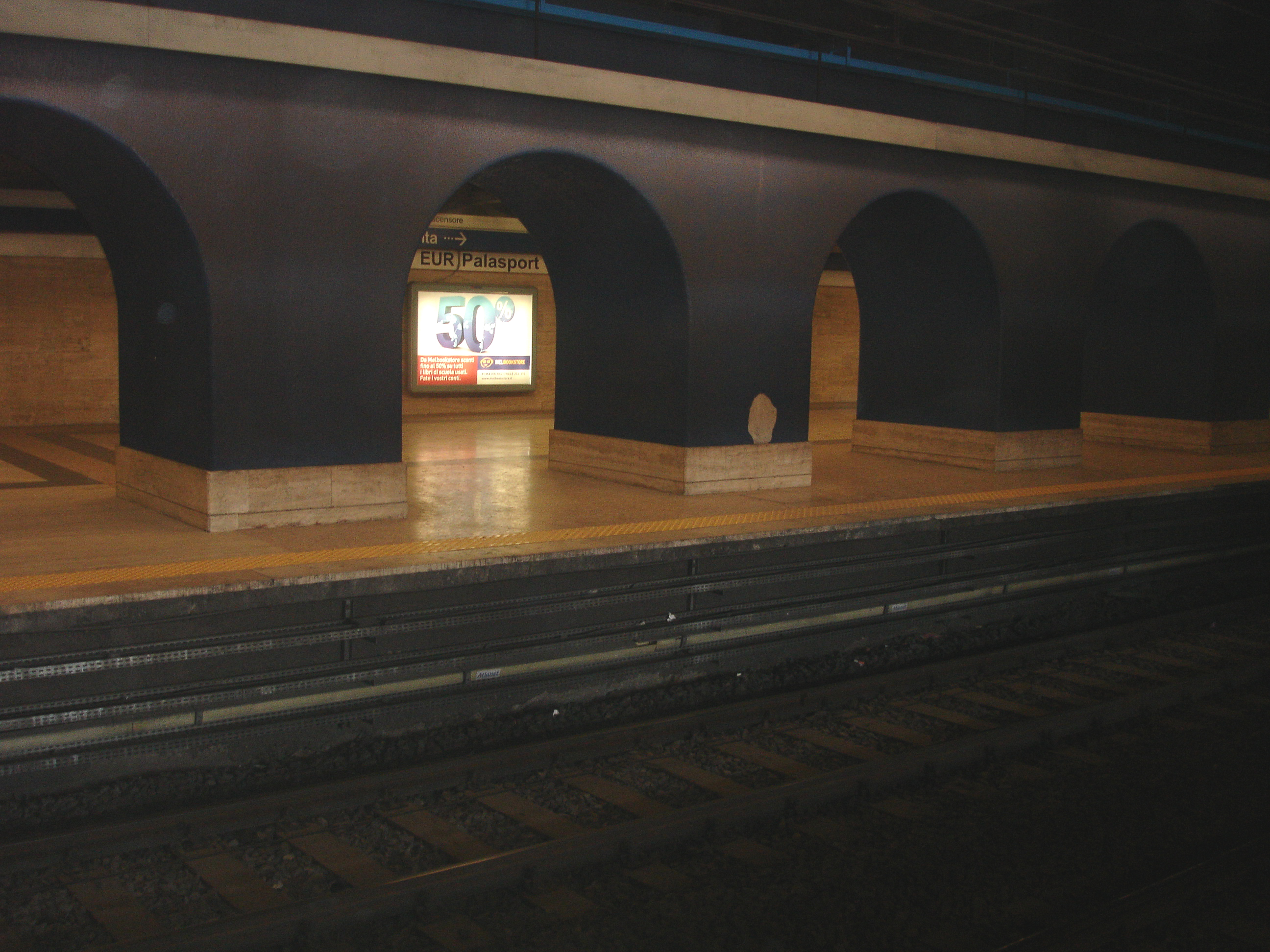

General information
- Location: EUR, Rome
- Coordinates: 41°49′48″N 12°28′00″E
- Owner: ATAC

Construction
- Structure type: Underground

History
- Opened: 1955; 71 years ago

Services
Preceding station	Rome Metro	Following station
EUR Fermi towards Laurentina	Line B	EUR Magliana towards Rebibbia or Jonio
Location
- Click on the map to see marker

EUR Palasport is a station on Line B of the Rome Metro, in the EUR district of Rome between Viale America and Piazza Umberto Elia Terracini. It was opened in 1955 as EUR Marconi but renamed to its present name on the opening of the new Marconi station. Beside it is the artificial lake created for the 1960 Summer Olympics.

== Surroundings ==
- PalaLottomatica
- Laghetto dell'Eur
