= EUR Fermi =

Rome metro station

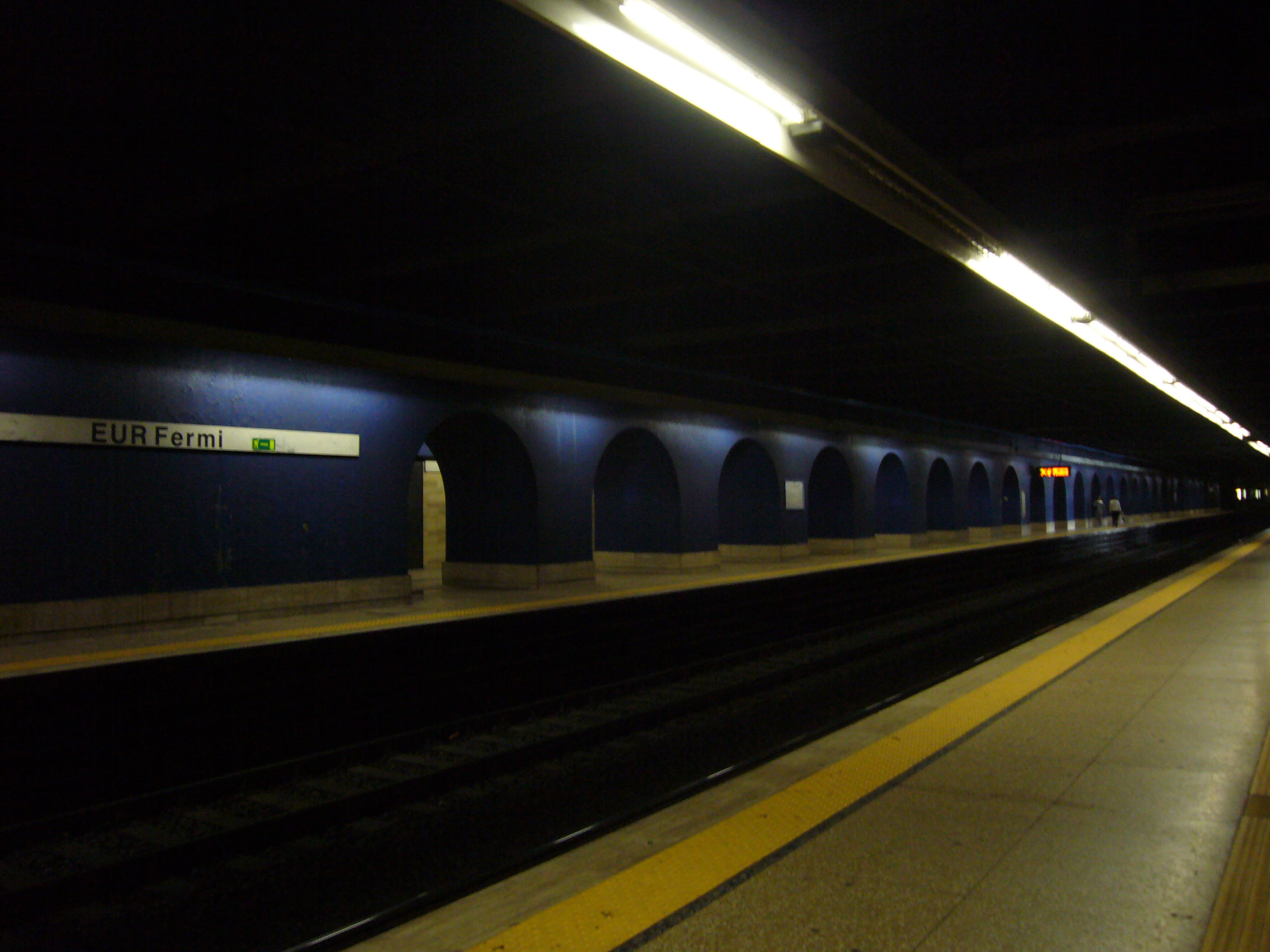

General information
- Location: EUR, Rome
- Coordinates: 41°49′43″N 12°28′16″E
- Owner: ATAC
- Tracks: 2

Construction
- Structure type: Underground with overground exit on the Laurentina-bound route
- Platform levels: 0
- Parking: Yes
- Cycle facilities: No

History
- Opened: 10 February 1955; 71 years ago

Services
Preceding station	Rome Metro	Following station
Laurentina Terminus	Line B	EUR Palasport towards Rebibbia or Jonio
Location
- Click on the map to see marker

EUR Fermi is a station on Line B of the Rome Metro. Opened in 1955, it is sited in the EUR between Viale America and Piazza della Stazione Enrico Fermi. Next to it is the artificial lake created for the 1960 Summer Olympics. The station's atrium houses mosaics which have won the Artemetro Roma prize by Bruno Ceccobelli (Italy) and Rupprecht Geiger (Germany).

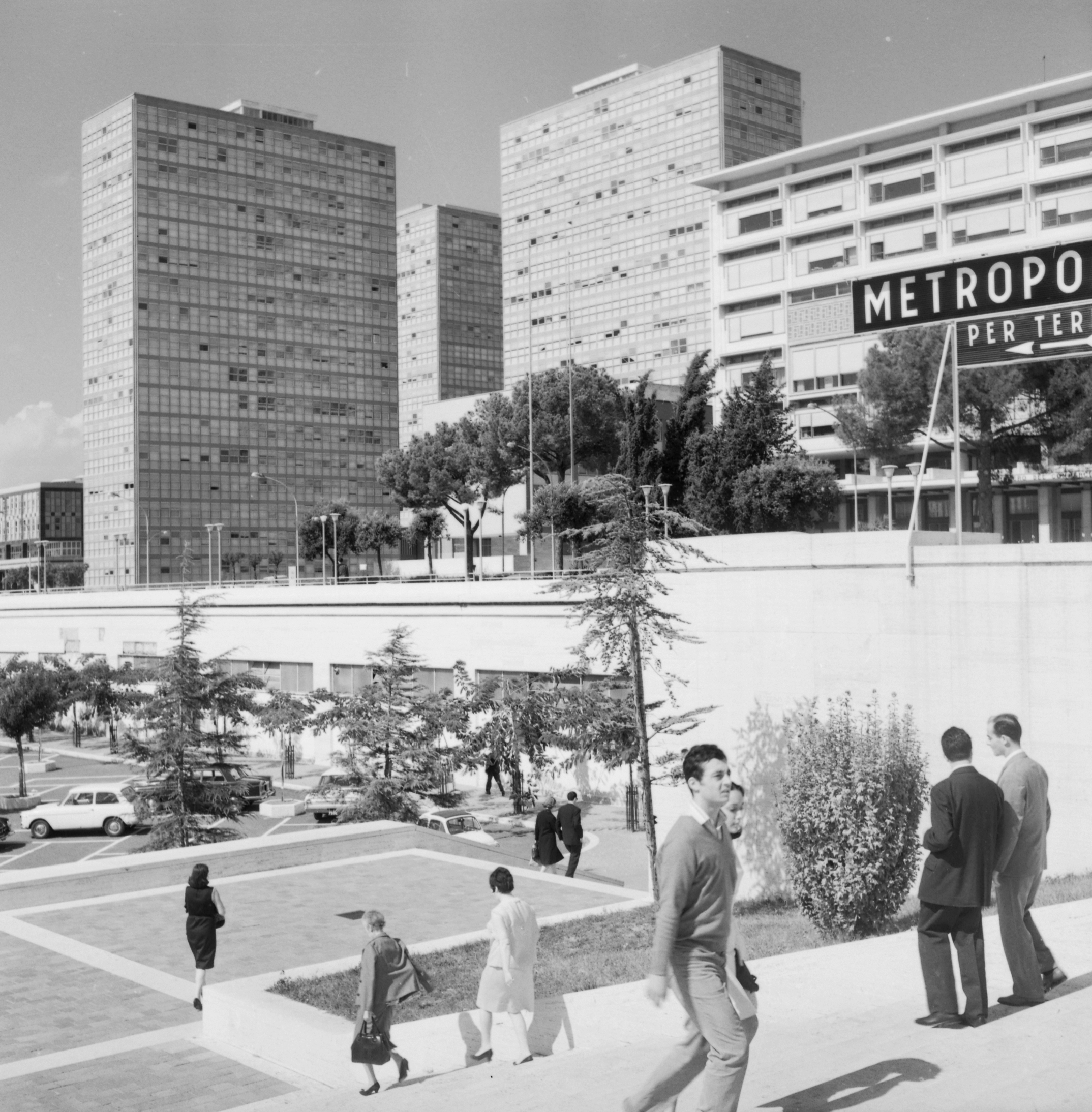
Photo by Paolo Monti, 1967

== Surroundings ==
- Central Archives of the State
- PalaLottomatica
- Laghetto dell'Eur
- INAIL
- Ministry of Infrastructure and Transport - HQ of Via dell'Arte
- Viale America
