= Garbatella =

Urban zone of Rome

Coordinates: 41.860548°N 12.488151°E

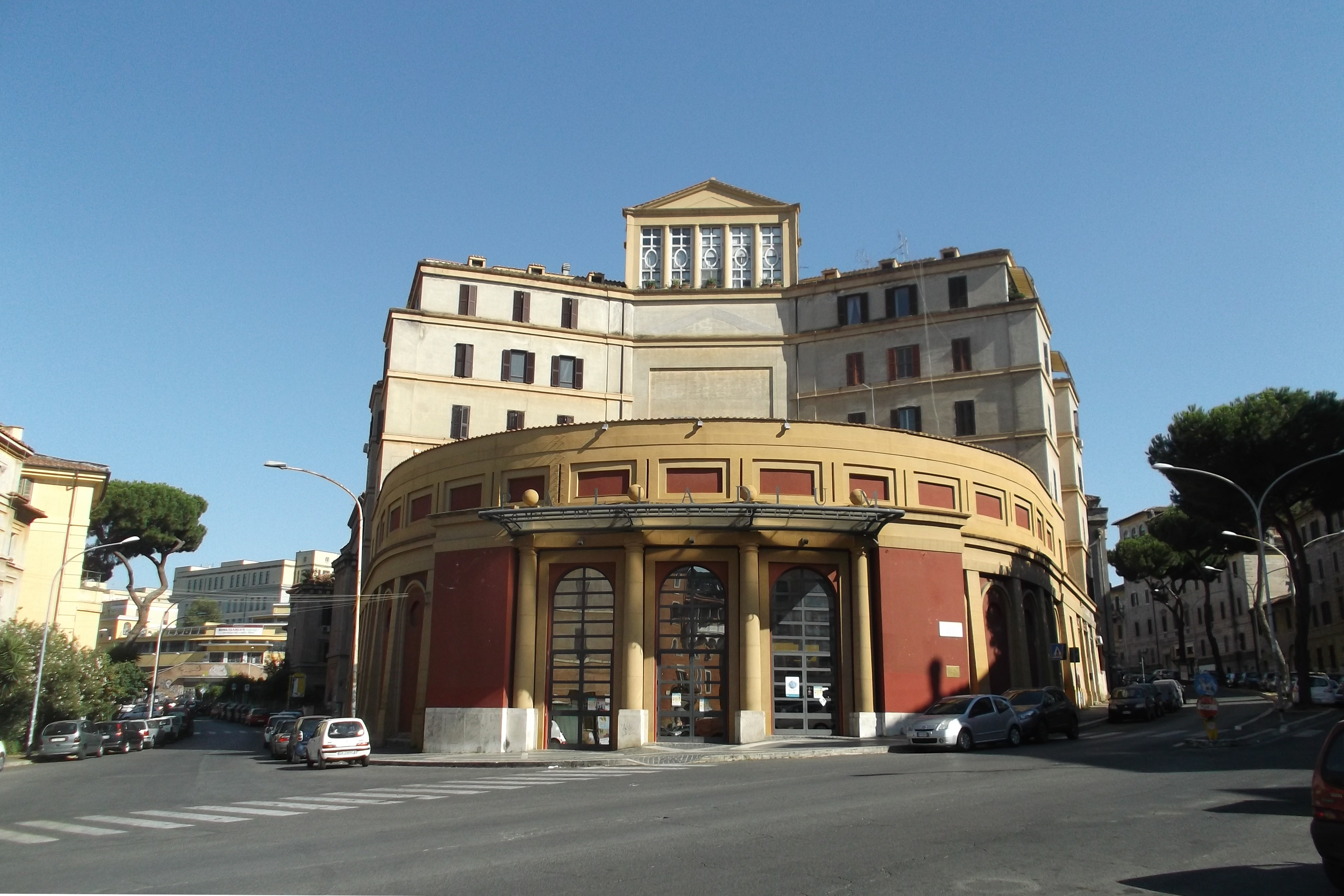
Palladium Theatre

Garbatella is an urban zone of Rome. It belongs to the Municipio VIII (ex-Municipio XI) of Rome comune, Italy, in the Ostiense quarter of Rome. Its population counts nearly 45,000.

== History ==
Garbatella was founded on February 18, 1920, on an estate bearing the same name, lying on a hill adjacent to the Basilica of Saint Paul Outside the Walls. The older section of the area is divided into project units (Italian: lotto), each of them made of several buildings grouped together around a common garden, a design that was borrowed from the English Garden city movement. The garden serves as an informal meeting point for all the families that live in the buildings.

The area expanded rapidly and by 1930 it had the highest population density in Rome.

== Places of interest ==
- The Teatro Palladium, an historic theatre in Rome, now run by Roma Tre University.
- Close to the Via Cristoforo Colombo, the imposing building of the Regional Council of Lazio region.

== Transport ==
- Garbatella Line B (Rome Metro) station.

== People ==
- Giorgia Meloni, the incumbent Prime Minister of Italy, grew up in Garbatella.
