= Rebibbia (Rome Metro) =

Rome metro station

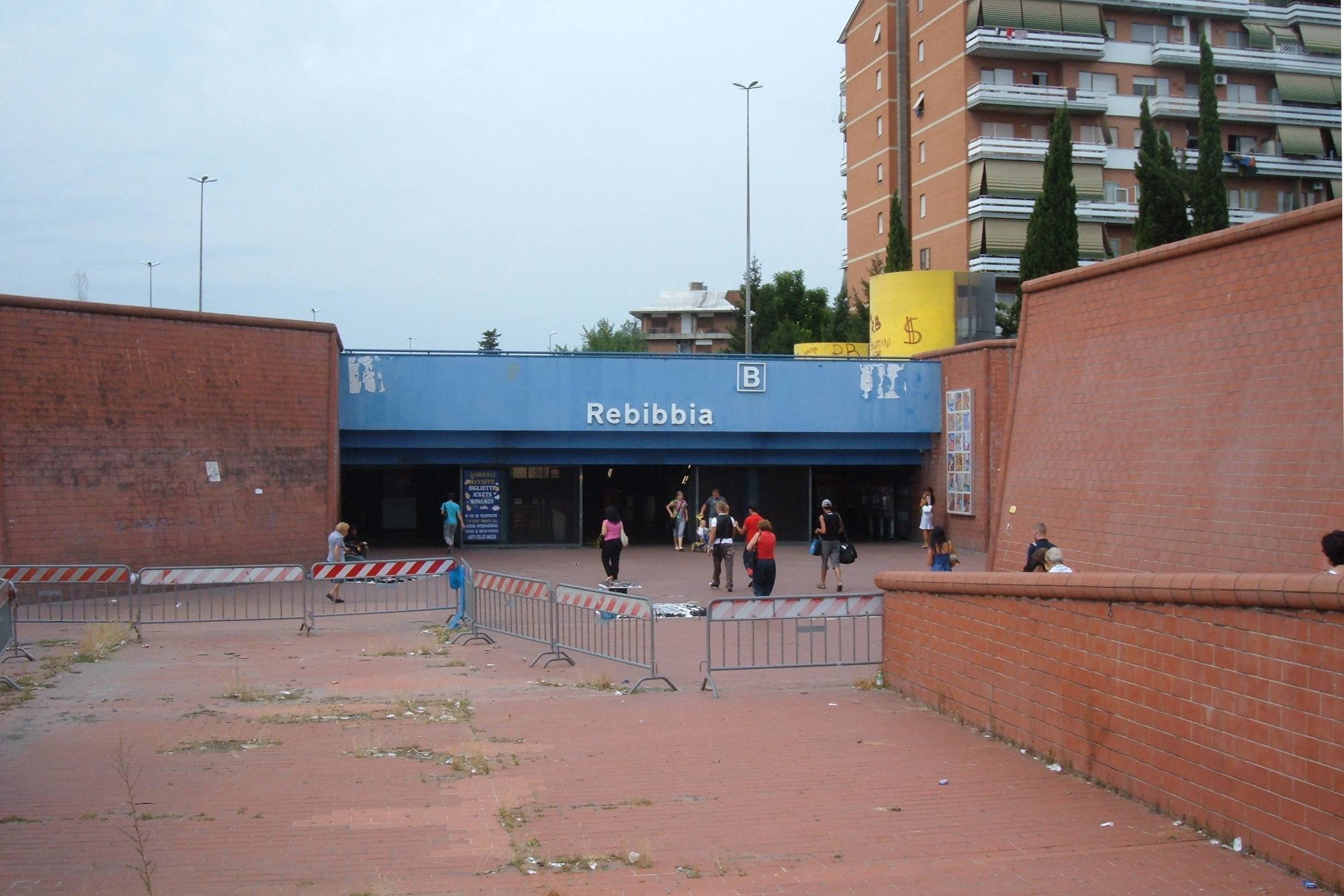

General information
- Coordinates: 41°55′33″N 12°34′23″E
- Owner: ATAC

Construction
- Structure type: Underground

History
- Opened: 1990; 36 years ago

Services
Preceding station	Rome Metro	Following station
Ponte Mammolo towards Laurentina	Line B	Terminus
Location
- Click on the map to see marker

Rebibbia is a station on the Rome Metro, and is the northern terminus of line B. It was opened in 1990 and is situated along via Tiburtina in the Rebibbia district at the north-eastern extremity of Rome. Beside the station is the Rebibbia prison.

In 2014, Italian cartoonist Zerocalcare created a mural for one of the walls of Rebibbia Metro Station.
