= Laurentina (Rome Metro) =

Rome metro station

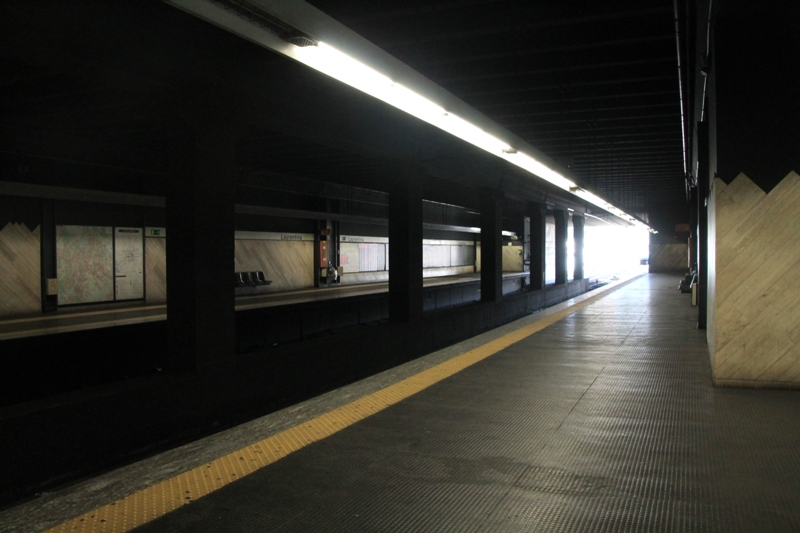

General information
- Coordinates: 41°49′37″N 12°28′52″E
- Owner: ATAC

Construction
- Structure type: Underground

History
- Opened: 1955; 71 years ago
- Rebuilt: 1990; 36 years ago

Services
Preceding station	Rome Metro	Following station
Terminus	Line B	EUR Fermi towards Rebibbia or Jonio
Location
- Click on the map to see marker

Laurentina is the southern terminus of Line B of the Rome Metro. It is in the Giuliano-Dalmata quarter at the crossroads of Via Laurentina, Via di Vigna Murata, Viale Luca Gaurico and Largo Vittime delle Foibe Istriane The first station on the site was begun in the 1930s, but only completed and opened in 1955. This was demolished in the 1980s, and the present building opened in 1990. It is also the terminus for several suburban bus routes.

== Surroundings and amenities ==
The neighborhood is primarily a residential suburb. The station is in walking distance from many cafes, restaurants, and shops.

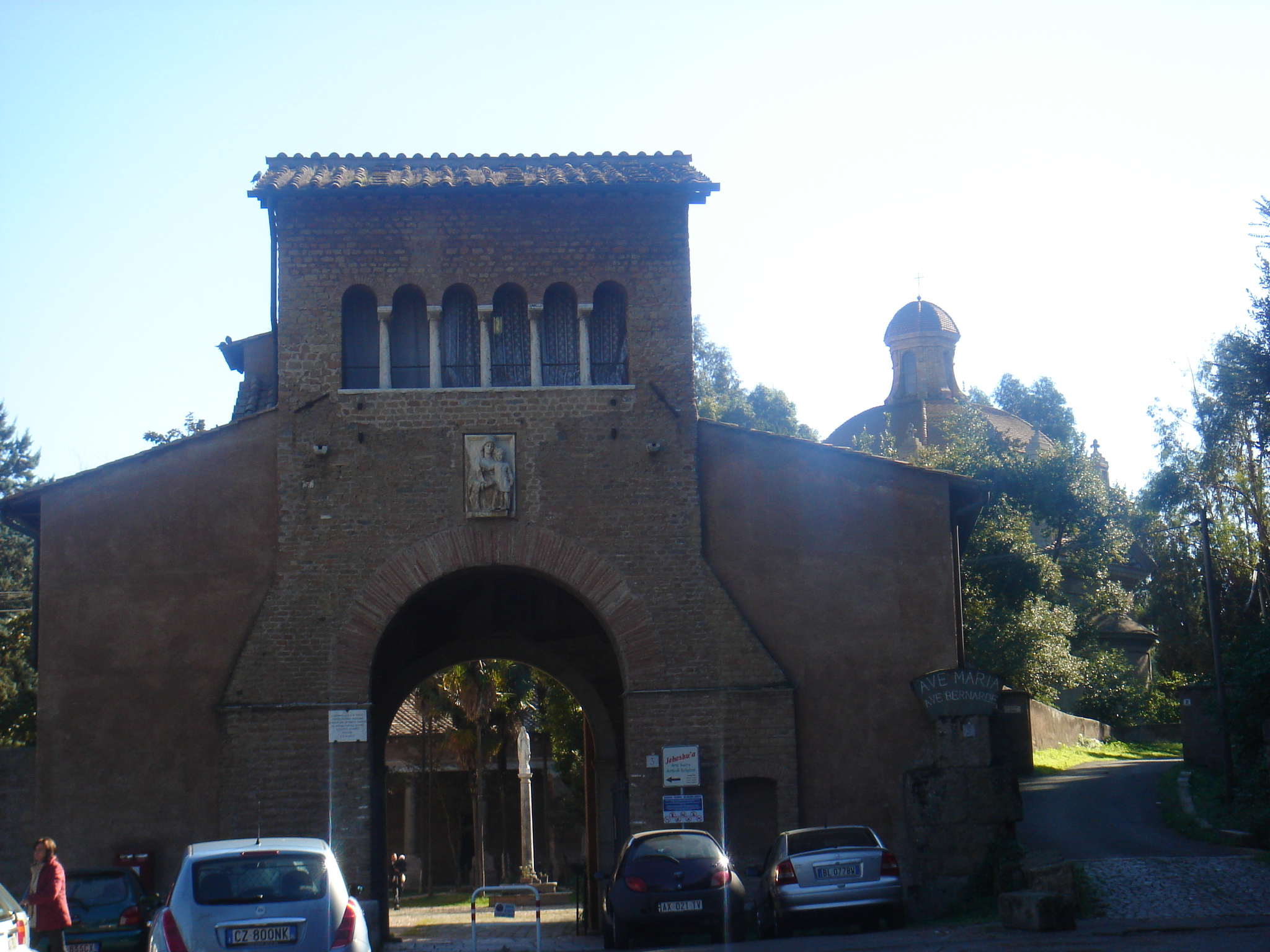
The Arch of Charlemagne at the Tre Fontana Abbey entrance

There are no major tourist attractions close to the Station; however there are two religious sites. The first is Tre Fontane Abbey, an active abbey and church 1.5 km or a 21 minutes' walk north of the Station. The second is the Provincial House of the Order of Friars Minor Conventual in the Park of the Eucalyptus, which is an 11 minute walk north of the Station, on the way to the Tre Fontane Abbey.

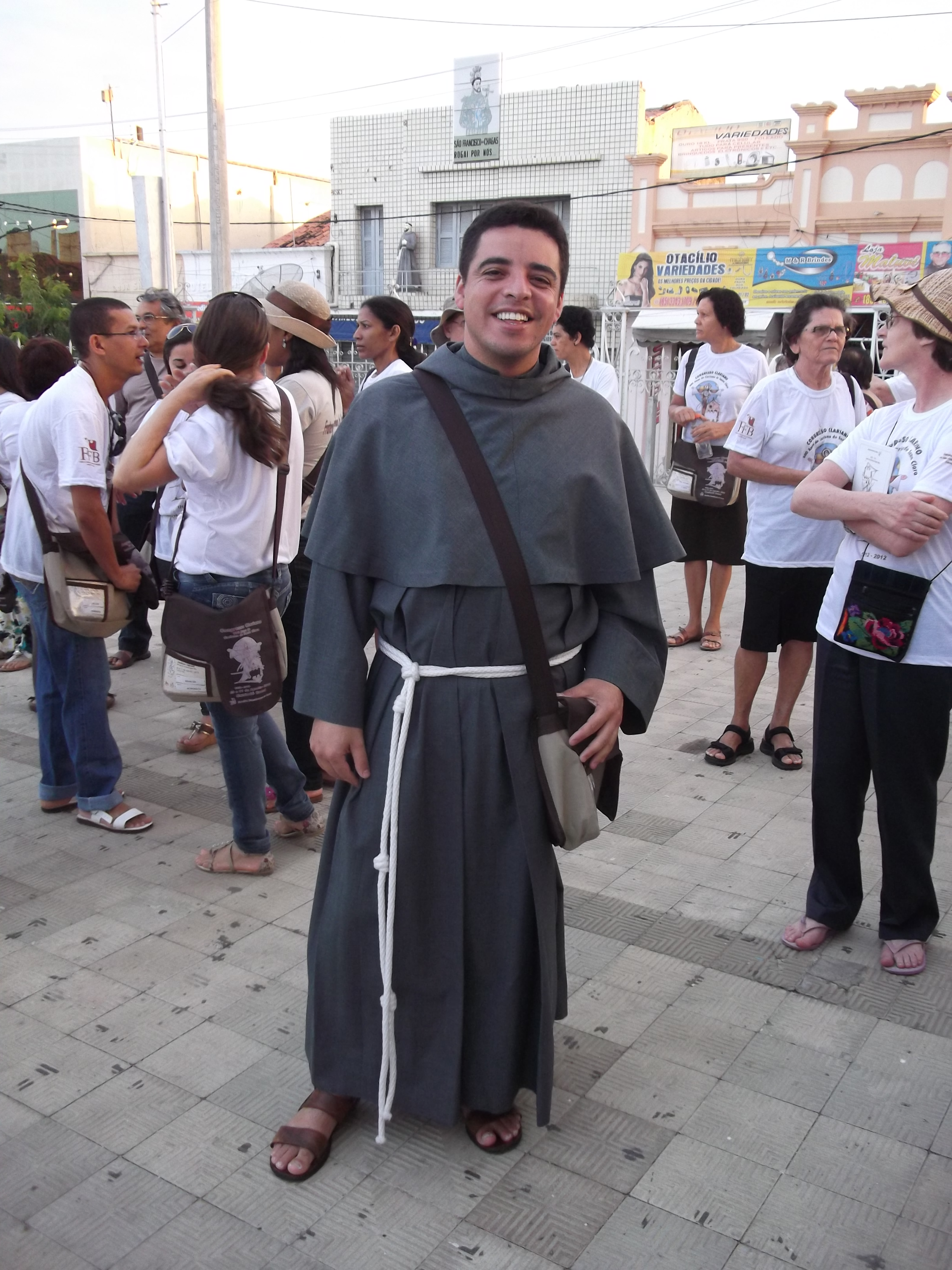
A Conventual Franciscan in Brazil

Sant'Eugenio Hospital is nearby.

Via Laurentina is a major road next to the Station, and for which it is named. In addition to the usual neighborhood amenities, there are several hotels along the strip of road.

== Connections ==
In addition to many local buses, there are some regional bus services that terminate at this rail head.
